= Rue de Gadagne =

Street in the 5th arrondissement of Lyon, France

Coordinates: 45.764356°N 4.827722°E

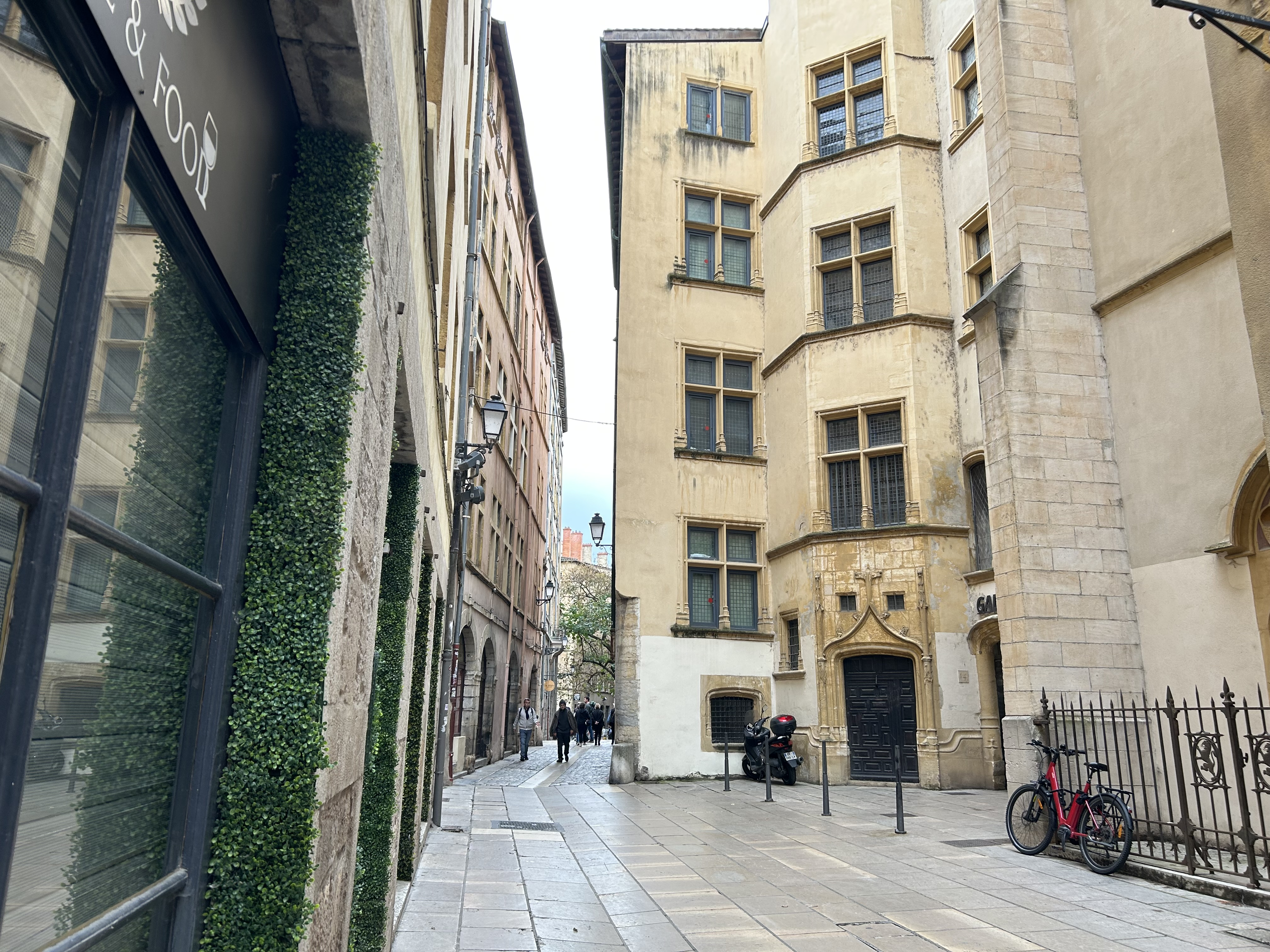
- View of the street in 2025.
- Interactive map of Rue de Gadagne
- Former names: Rue de Boissette (1317–1493); Rue tendant du Puits de la Porcherie à la Grande Maison de Pierre de Pompério (1493–1530); Rue de Pierrevive (1530–1614)
- Location: 5th arrondissement of Lyon, Lyon, France
- Postal code: 69005

Construction
- Construction start: Second half of the 3rd century
- Completion: 16th–17th centuries

The Rue de Gadagne (French pronunciation: [ʁy d(ə) ɡadaɲ]) is a paved pedestrian street in the Saint-Jean quarter, in the 5th arrondissement of Lyon, France. It extends the Rue du Bœuf and ends on the Rue Lainerie that leads itself to Place Saint-Paul. It is located in the center of Vieux Lyon and is part to the area which includes a mosaic of squares: the Place du Change, Place du Petit Collège and Place de la Baleine in the extension of the Rue Saint-Jean. The street belongs to the zone classified as a World Heritage Site by UNESCO.

It is served by bus lines 29, 30, 31, 44 and 184, a Lyon Metro station (Vieux-Lyon - Cathédrale Saint-Jean, Line D), as well as three Vélo'v stations.

== History ==
In 1317, the street was called Rue de Boissette after the name of a big house "La Boissette", then in 1493 Rue tendant du Puits de la Porcherie à la Grande Maison de Pierre de Pompério, then in 1530, the Rue Pierre-Vive or Pierrevive (the street is attested under this name in 1550), the name of an old Piemontese family which had moved to Lyon in the late fifteenth century. Treasurer General of France Charles Pierrevive lived in the street. Between 1511 and 1525, his descendants did build two twin mansions who were later turned into museums : the Musée historique de Lyon and the Musée international de la marionnette (i.e. the current Musée Gadagne, built in 1493).

Thereafter, these buildings were sold to the Gondi family, then in 1545 to the Gadagne family, a famous Lyon family who gave its name to the street in 1614. Gadagne brothers, Thomas, Lord de Beauregard, and Guillaume, seneschal of Lyon in 1564, were Italian bankers. Thomas Gadagne bought the hotel in 1538.

The street was opened in 1650 on the Rue du Bœuf, then called Rue Tramassac. The No. 6 of the street was sold to the hospitals of Lyon.

== Architecture ==
Very representative of the Renaissance architecture of the neighborhood, the street is wide in front of the City Hall of the fifth arrondissement which is the former Jesuit college, and much more narrow in its northern part. There are two restaurants.

At the corner of the Rue de la Fronde, a statue of St. Anne can be seen, and four small old houses are open by ten arches aligned on the western side of the street. The No. 2 is a building constructed in the Middle Ages/ Renaissance with three floors and mullioned windows.

The most notable monument of the street is the Musée Gadagne, at Nos. 12-14, which is the biggest Renaissance building in Lyon. It was purchased by the city of Lyon in 1902, opened in 1921 and installed in the Hôtel Gadagne. Its main entrance is located on the old stables of the Place du Petit Collège. Then a spiral staircase into a polygonal tower gives access to the three floors of galleries.
