= Église Saint-Paul de Lyon =

Church building in Lyon, France

Église Saint-Paul
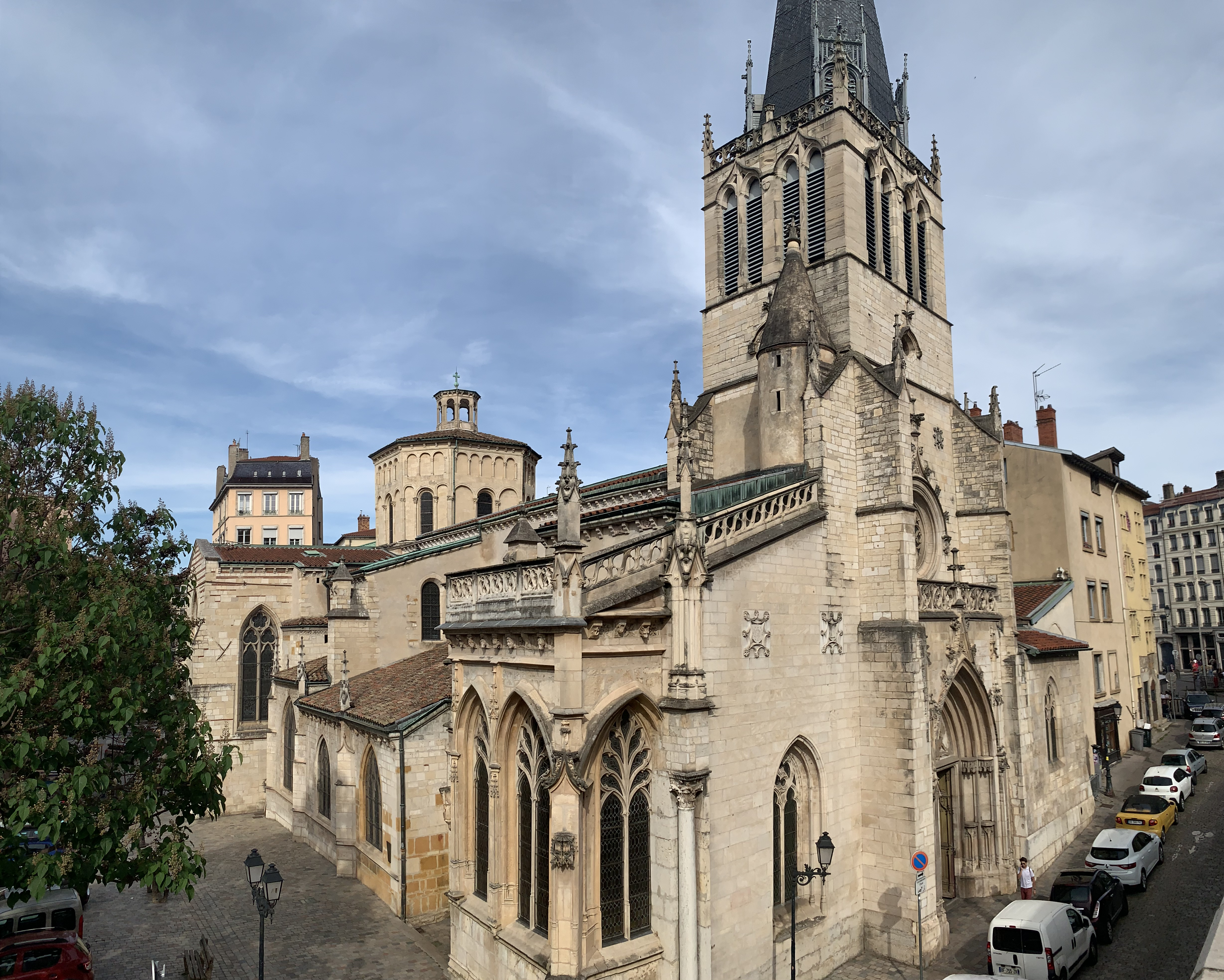
- The chevet and the cupola of the church

Religion
- Affiliation: Roman Catholic Church
- Diocese: 5th arrondissement of Lyon
- Leadership: Roman Catholic Archdiocese of Lyon

Location
- Location: Lyon, France
- Interactive map of Église Saint-Paul
- Coordinates: 45.7667°N 4.8271°E

Architecture
- Type: church
- Style: Romanesque, Gothic
- Spire: 1

The Église Saint-Paul is a Roman Catholic church located in Lyon, France. It is situated in the Vieux Lyon, in the Saint-Paul quarter, in the 5th arrondissement of Lyon. The cathedral is in the Romanesque and Gothic architectural styles. The tower-lantern was classified as monument historique in 1920, and the whole church was classified in 1996. In 2002, the church was completely renovated. It is around 45 m long and 16.5 m high under the arch.

== History ==
Built around 549 by the Lyon bishop Saint Sacerdos, the church was damaged in 732, then restored in the early 9th century by archbishop Leidrade. In the 10th century, it became a necropolis with three cemeteries. Archbishop Hugh of Die requested its reconstruction, which was accomplished during the 11th and 12th centuries (the bell tower in 1440).

The church was damaged during the siege of the city by the Baron of Adrets, then during the revolution in 1793, after which it was transformed into a saltpetre store and became a parish church in 1801. Many changes were made to the church during the 19th century, including the removal of saltpetre soil and the paving, along with numerous additions: the lantern of the top of the octagonal tower in 1835, the Gothic portal in 1877, paintings by Paul Borel added to the choir in 1899, the eleven bells of the bell tower, and so forth.

== Architecture ==
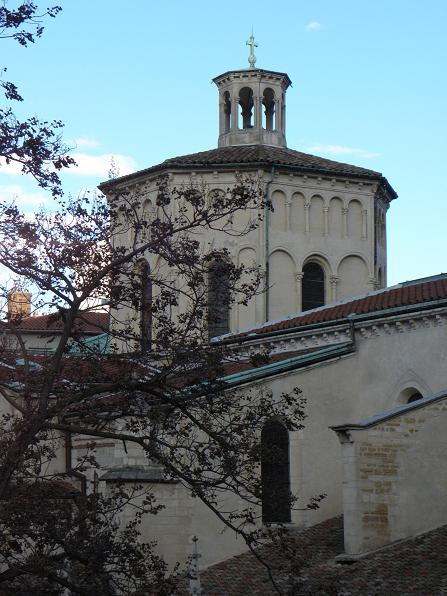
The tower-lantern of the church

The Gothic style appeared in the bell tower-porch and in the side chapels. The nave is composed of four bays with four carved capitals pillars. The current 24-meter stone spire which tops the tower disappeared in 1818, was replaced by another one in wood in 1875, and was finally rebuilt in 1982. A gallery in quatrefoils, a rose window and shields compose 19th century western facade.

The smallest bell, called Eleanor and was made in 1626. The lower bell weighs over four tons was cast in Lyon by Gédéon Morel and is the most decorated one in the world.

There are 16 small chapels along the aisles of the church. The first one of them appeared after 1470. The most notorious is that of the baptismal fonts, from the 16th century, by Jean Palmier.
