= Place Benoît-Crépu =

Square in Lyon, France

Coordinates: 45°45′30″N 4°49′35″E

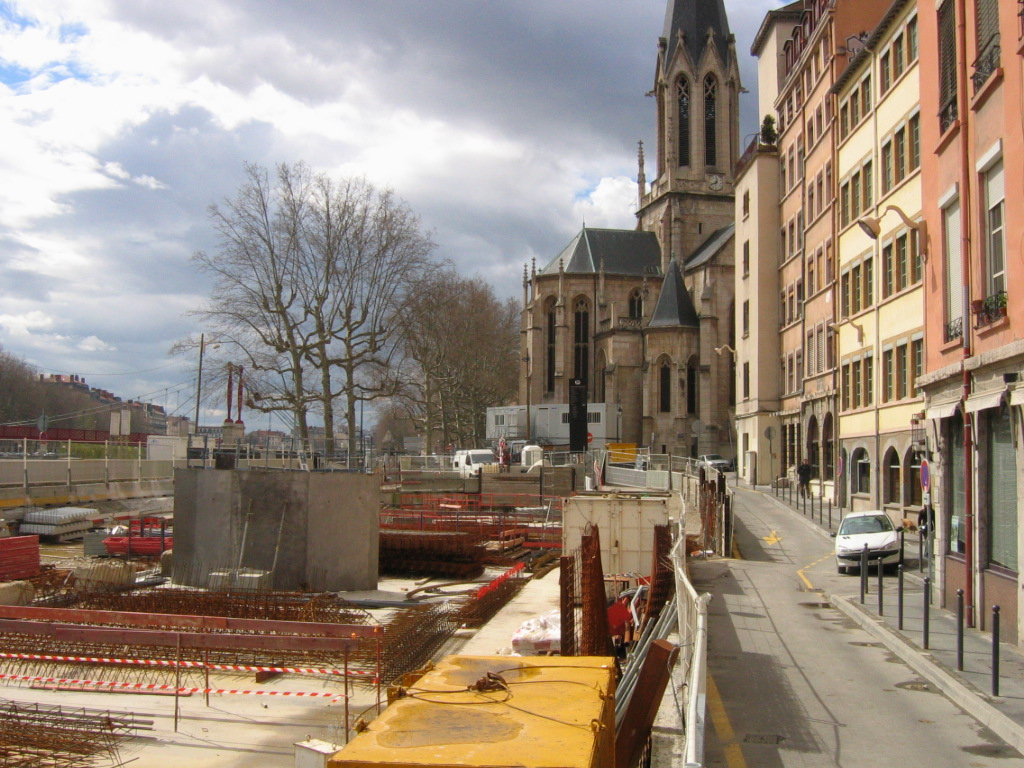
The square during the building of the car park

The Place Benoît-Crépu is a stone-paved square, located in Saint-Georges quarter, on the banks of the Saône (Vieux Lyon), in the 5th arrondissement of Lyon. It has fountains with dolphin heads, many benches and trees and a playground. The place belongs to the area classified as World Heritage Site by UNESCO.

== History ==
In the thirteenth century the Order of St. Anthony was established here. This square partly absorbed the Rue Pierre-Percée, now called Rue Monseigneur Lavarenne.

The square was modified when the Quai Fulchiron was created in 1858, then expanded after the destruction of houses that prolonged the Rue Lavarenne. The square was renovated for the construction of an underground car park from 2001 to 2006. During this work, various objects, including three Gallo-Roman boats, relatively well preserved, dating from the first or second century, were discovered. Similarly, while digging the tunnel which connects the parking under the rue Monseigneur-Lavarenne, several buildings of the Middle Ages were discovered, apparently abandoned after the many floods of the Saône. Some of the old ramparts were also found. All archaeological discoveries caused a six to nine-month delay of work.

This square is situated on one of the many ports of the Saône, the port du Sablet or Sablé, which existed from the late Middle Ages to 1844, and was destroyed with the surrounding houses to develop the current wharf (e.g. a house was demolished in 1707 to create the square). The square was formerly named Place du Port-Sablé (also spelled Sablet, which perhaps referred to the sandy nature of the soil or the unloading of vessels which contained sand). In 1866, the church of Saint-Pierre-le-Vieux, which was on the square, was demolished. The current name was assigned by the municipal council of 23 November 1894 as tribute to Benoît Crépu, a tanner born in Lyon on 23 January 1839 and died in the city on 4 April 1893, as he had donated part of his fortune to the city of Lyon. In his will, he gave his building located at No. 24 rue de la Quarantine to be sold for the benefit of secular schools.

== Architecture and description ==
The square has limestone benches and beautiful pavements. The vegetation consists mainly of silk trees and groves of laurel.

The majority of the square consists of two rows of four to six-storey buildings with narrow facades generally built in the 19th century. The building between the wharf and the Rue Lavarenne was created in 1845; it has six different floors with a Virgin and Child at the corner of the wharf. At No. 8, two plaques say the height of the floods of the Saône on 5 November 1840 and 21 May 1856.

After having served for a while as a station for trolleys and buses, the square was gradually transformed into a large garden through a space reorganization. In 2008, landscapers of the Ilex agency completely modified the square.

The Église Saint-Georges is near the square.

== See also ==
- List of streets and squares in Lyon
