= 5th arrondissement of Lyon =

- Municipal arrondissement
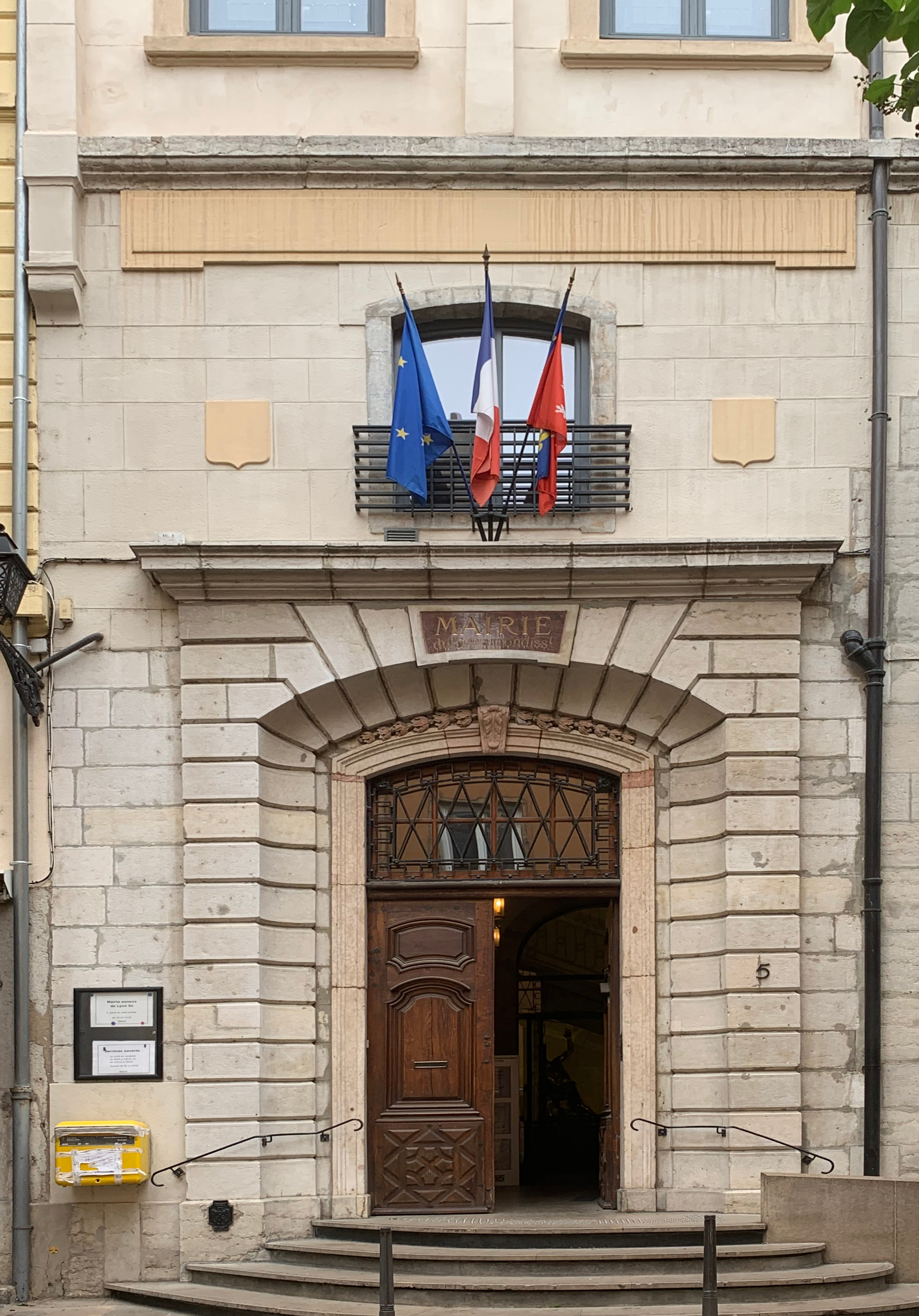
- View of the mairie of the 5th arrondissement

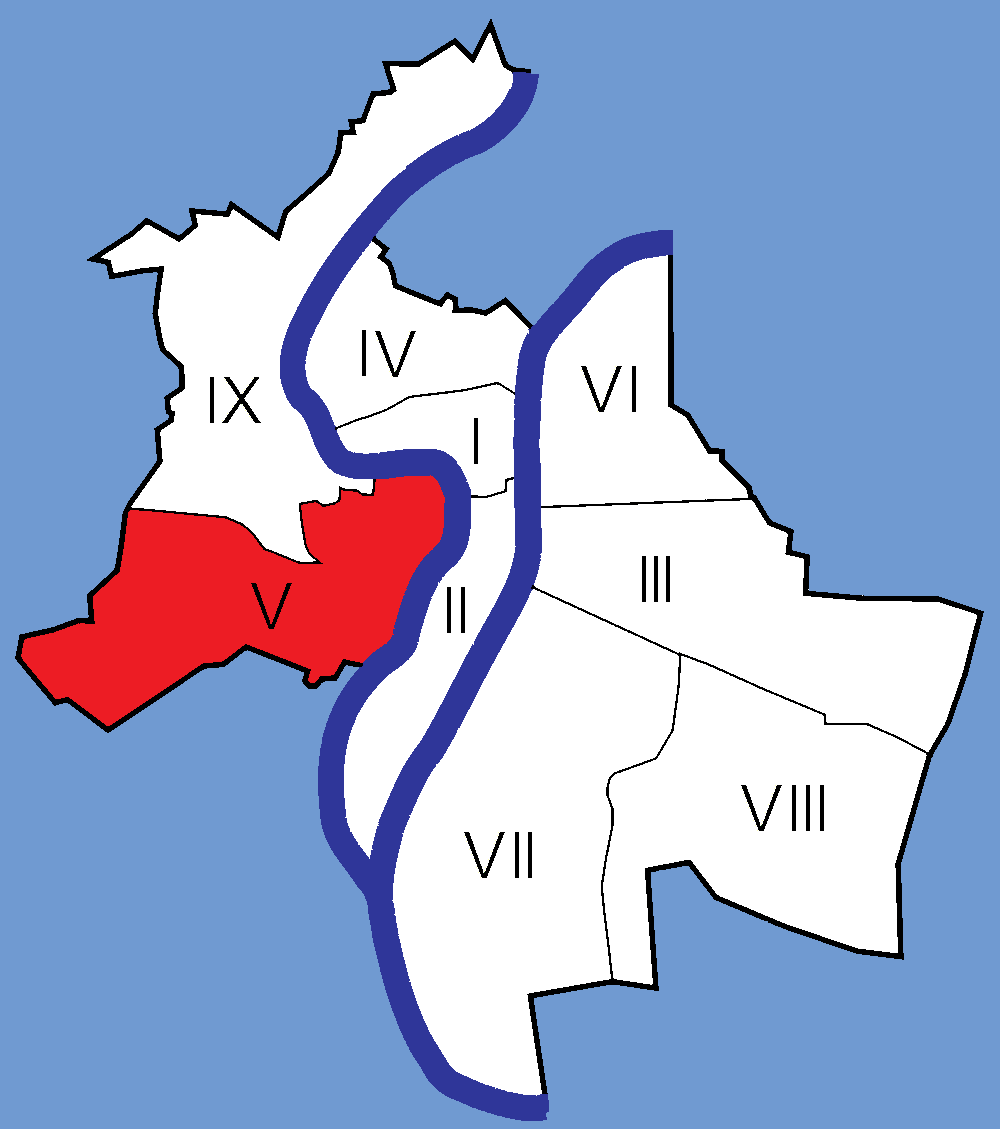
- Location within Lyon
- Coordinates: 45°45′30″N 4°47′57″E
- Country: France
- Region: Auvergne-Rhône-Alpes
- Department: Lyon Metropolis
- Commune: Lyon

Government
  - Mayor (2020–2026): Nadine Georgel (EELV)
- Area: 6.23 km^{2} (2.41 sq mi)
- Population (2023): 47,777
  - Density: 7,670/km^{2} (19,900/sq mi)
- INSEE code: 69385

The nine arrondissements of Lyon

Arrondissements of Lyon

The 5th arrondissement of Lyon (French: 5^{e} arrondissement de Lyon) is one of the nine arrondissements of the City of Lyon, France.

== History ==
The 5th arrondissement was created on 24 March 1852 (date of creation of the first five arrondissements). It is the historic center of Lyon. It is at Fourvière that Munatius Plancus founded the Roman colony of Lugdunum in 43 BC. It was in this arrondissement that the Roman and medieval Lyon flourishes just before crossing the Saône.

Historic quarters of Lyon are well known, which are all touristic sites, but behind the Vieux Lyon and Fourvière, there are the residential areas of the Point du Jour, Champvert, Ménival, Saint-Irénée which remain misunderstood but still show traces of the Roman past of the city.

The Decree of 1 August 1963 linked the town of Saint-Rambert-l'Île-Barbe to the 5th arrondissement. But the following year, the district was divided, as the northern part became the 9th arrondissement of Lyon (Decree of 12 August 1964).

== Geography ==
=== Area and demographics ===
- 623 ha (1,540 acres)
- 1999 : 46,985 inhabitants
- 2005 : 46,300 inhabitants
- 2006 : 47,330 inhabitants
- Relative density : 7,542 inhabitants per square kilometre (19,530/sq mi)

=== Quarters ===
- Vieux Lyon
  - Saint-Georges
  - Saint-Jean
  - Saint-Paul
- Fourvière
- Saint-Just
- Saint-Irénée
- Le Point du Jour
- Champvert
- Ménival

=== Streets and squares ===
- Montée du Gourguillon
- Rue de Gadagne
- Rue du Bœuf
- Rue Lainerie
- Place Abbé-Larue
- Place Benoît-Crépu
- Place de la Trinité

=== Parks ===
- Jardin des Curiosités
- Parc de la garde
- Parc des Hauteurs

== Architecture ==
=== Monuments and buildings ===
- Lyon Cathedral (Primatiale Saint-Jean)
- Basilica of Notre-Dame de Fourvière
- Église Saint-Georges
- Église Saint-Paul
- Église Saint-Just
- Église Saint-Irénée
- Théâtre antique de Fourvière
- Temple du Change
- La Tour Rose
- La galerie Philibert Delorme
- Musée Gadagne
- Maison Pauline Jaricot
- Manécanterie
- Palais de justice historique de Lyon (Cour d'appel de Lyon)
- Château de Ménival

== Related articles ==
- Montée Saint-Clair-Duport
