= Musée Gadagne =

- Hôtel Gadagne
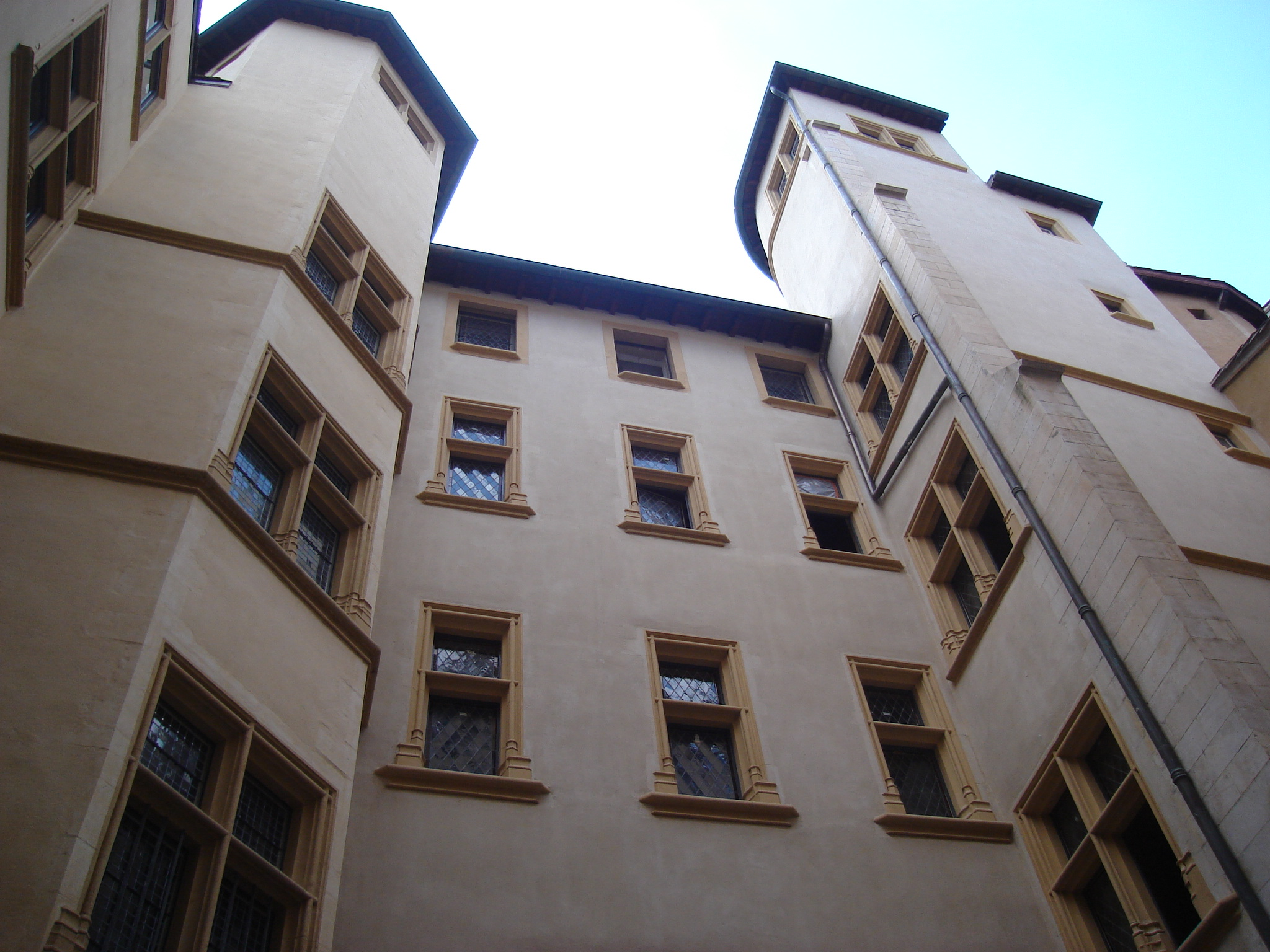
- Facade of the museum

- Location within Metropole de Lyon

General information
- Type: Museum
- Location: 1 Place du Petit Collège, 5th arrondissement of Lyon, Lyon, France
- Coordinates: 45°45′51″N 4°49′39″E
- Inaugurated: 1921

The Musée Gadagne (French pronunciation: [myze ɡadaɲ]) is a museum located in the center of the Vieux Lyon, in the Saint-Jean quarter, in the 5th arrondissement of Lyon, France. It is composed of the Musée d'Histoire de Lyon (Museum of Lyon History) and the Musée des Marionnettes du monde (World Puppet Museum). The building was classified as a historic monument in 1920. It was acquired by the city of Lyon between 1902, and 1941. After it was determined to be in need of repair, the museum closed in 1998 for more than ten years for renovation and expansion. It was re-opened on 12 June 2009.

== History ==
The museum is located in the Hôtel Gadagne, a building constructed in the early sixteenth century by the brothers Pierrevive (from 1511–1527). It was redesigned by the Gadagne (or Gadagni) brothers in 1545. This rich Florentine family lived in Lyon in the early fifteenth century. The brothers had many disagreements, and as a result, they stayed in two different parts of the hotel. At the time, their large fortune inspired a saying in Lyon: "riche comme Gadagne" ("rich as Gadagne"). At one time, one of the brothers, Thomas I de Gadagne (known as Thomas the Rich), paid part of the ransom to Louise of Savoy for the release of King Francis I, a prisoner of the Spaniards after the battle of Pavia in 1525.

In the seventeenth century, the hotel was divided evenly into small quarters. In 1902, it was partially bought by the city of Lyon.

On 19 January 1998, the city council decided to close the museum to undertake major expansion and a controversial renovation. After ten years of closure and a major campaign of archaeological excavations, the museum opened its doors again in 2009. During that time, it expanded from an area of 3500 m^{2} to 6300 m^{2}.

== Description ==
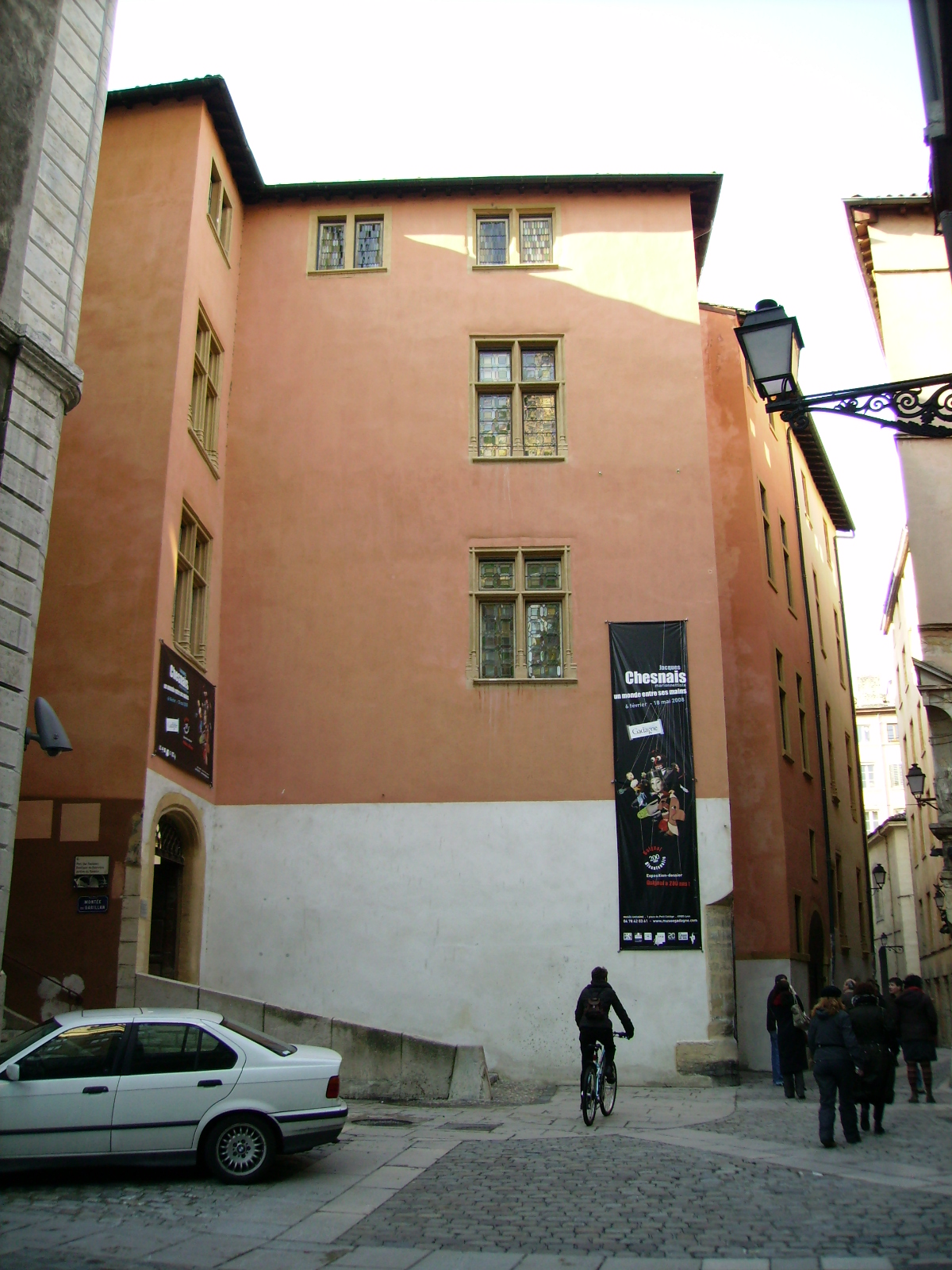
Entrance of the museum

Since 1921, the hotel has been home to the Historical Museum of Lyon. It features the collections previously installed at the Hôtel de Ville, Lyon until 1857. This museum consists of 80,000 objects in 30 rooms spread over four floors. It traces the cultural history of Lyon since the Middle Ages until the nineteenth century, giving archaeological remains, sculptures, paintings, furniture, and pottery. There are also many maps, drawings and engravings to illustrate the growth of the city and the construction of its main buildings.

Since 1950, the World Puppet Museum, organized around the Guignol puppet, has also been located in the Hotel Gadagne. The World Puppet Museum collection has featured as many as 2000 puppets over the course of its history. After the extensive renovation in the 2000s, the museum's collection is now presented throughout nine independent halls on the first floor.

Currently, the building has a ramp leading to the door of the first part of the building. Beyond the ramp, there is a large, majestic courtyard which is decorated with a sink, flanked at the bottom by a gallery of passages which allows traffic between both buildings on each floor. The third floor houses the small theater Gadagne (with a 150-seat capacity), and the fourth floor provides access to the garden of the museum (700 m^{2}).

== Bibliography ==
- Monique Ray, Catalogue de l'exposition du cinquantième anniversaire de la fondation du Musée historique de Lyon : 1921-1971 : hommage à Justin Godart (1871-1956), Lyon, Musée historique, 1971, 20 p.
- Monique Ray, Le musée historique / Le musée de la marionnette, guide sommaire, 3^{e} édition, 1978, 40 p.
- Monique Ray, « Acquisitions et réserves au musée historique de Lyon », Musées & collections publiques de France, n° 194 (1992), p. 34-36.
- Urbanisme et patrimoine à Lyon : 1850-1950 : naissance d'un musée, Lyon : Musée Gadagne, 1998, 80 p.
- Documents d'archéologie en Rhône-Alpes (DARA) n° 29 : Le musée Gadagne - Archéologie et histoire au cœur d'un projet patrimonial à Lyon (ISBN 2916125000)
