= Montée Saint-Clair-Duport =

Former street in Lyon, France

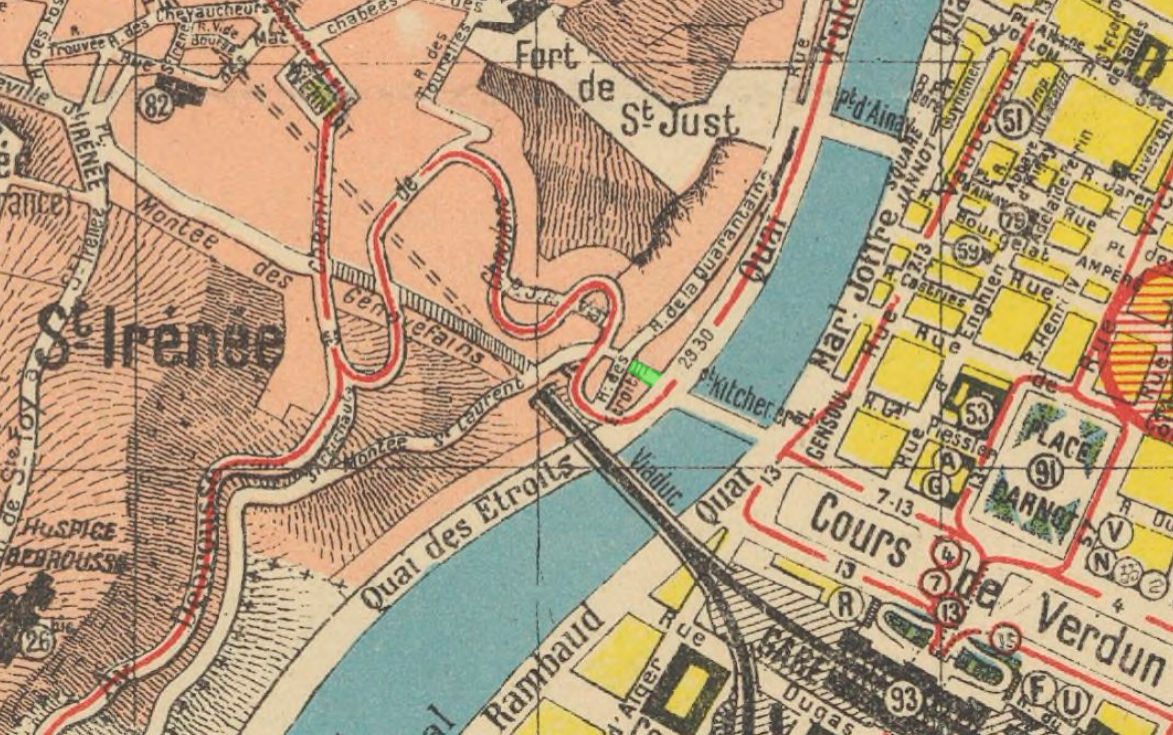
Montée Saint-Clair-Duport on Édouard Fonné's 1942 plan (in light green)

The Montée Saint-Clair-Duport is a former street in the 5th arrondissement of Lyon, France, located between the Quai Fulchiron and the Rue de la Quarantaine near the Saint-Laurent de Choulans basilica. It took its name from Clair-Dominique-Eugène Duport and existed for less than a century before it was closed in 1967 with the construction of the Fourvière tunnel.

The remains of the Saint-Laurent basilica, now visible on the Quai Fulchiron, and an impressive necropolis dating back to the Franco-Burgundian period were discovered under the road in the 1940s.

== Odonymy ==
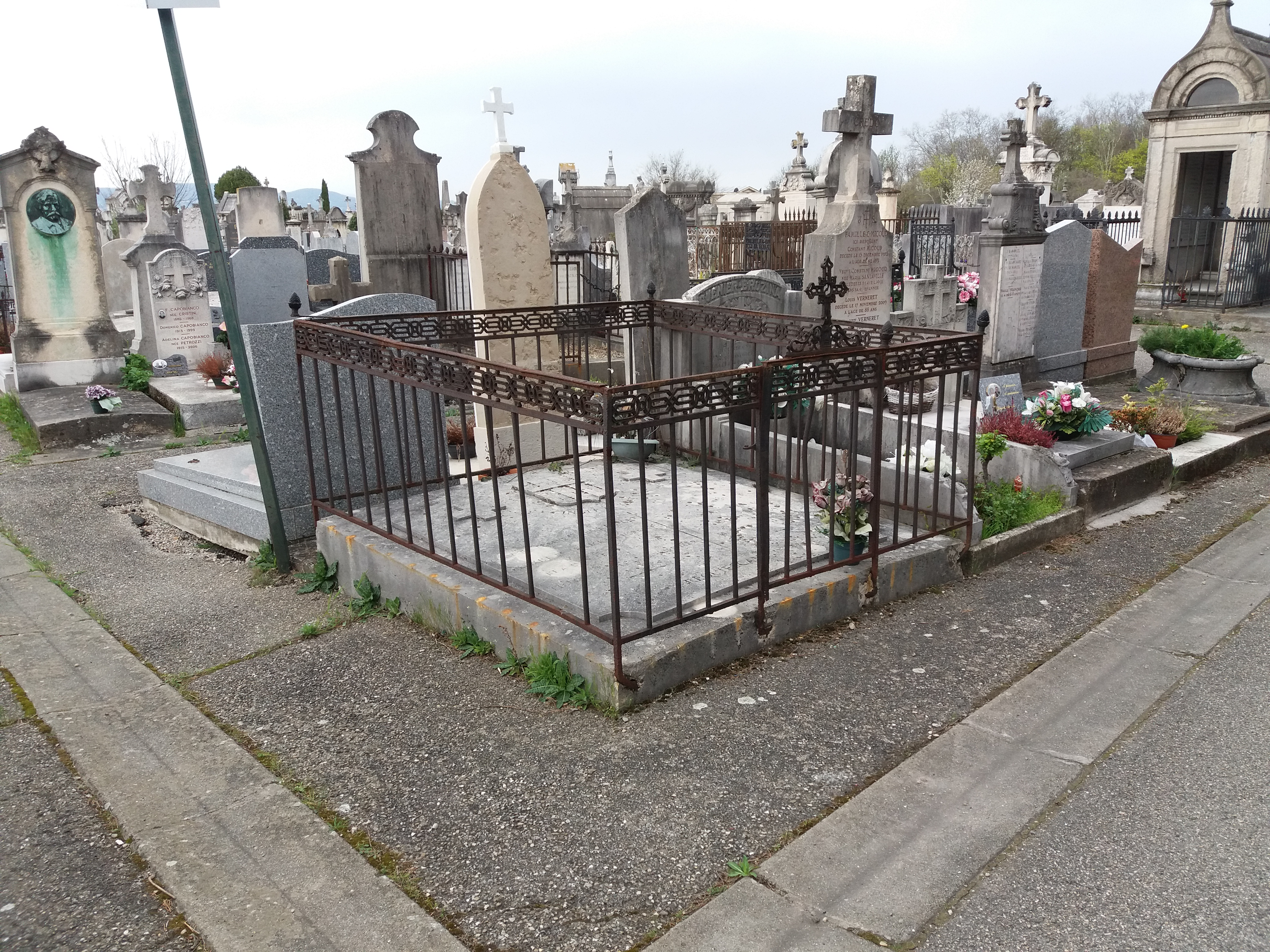
Tomb of Saint-Clair-Duport (Loyasse cemetery).

The Montée Saint-Clair-Duport was named after Clair-Dominique-Eugène Duport (known as Saint-Clair-Duport; born on 28 May 1804 in Lyon). He was director of the Hôtel des Monnaies de Mexico, wrote a book on the precious metals of Mexico, and was an economist who served as administrator of the Hospices Civils de Lyon between 1854 and 1864.

He died on 14 January 1864 in Lyon, and is buried in the Loyasse cemetery.

== History ==
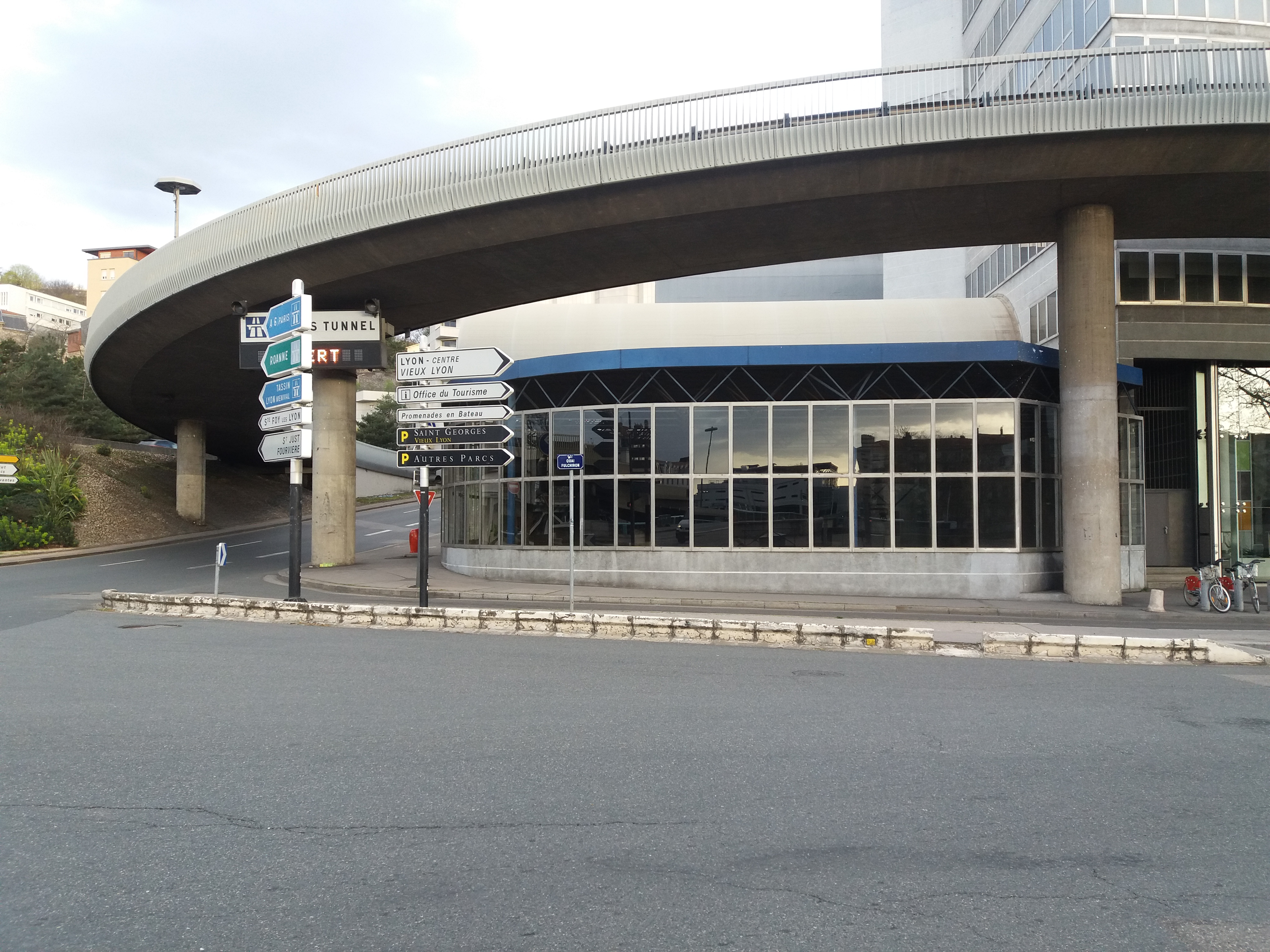
Montée de Choulans on the left and the site of the Montée Saint-Clair-Duport in the center.

The Montée Saint-Clair-Duport was created at the end of the 19th century, within the first cycle of the Montée de Choulans.

It started from the Quai de la Saône and ended with a staircase leading to the Rue de la Quarantaine, which ran north of the basilica and crossed the Montée de Choulans between the first and second cycles.

In 1947, skulls, an inscribed tablet, and ancient tombs were discovered under the roadway during the laying of telephone lines. Excavations revealed the remains of the Basilica of Saint-Laurent de Choulans and a necropolis.

It was destroyed in 1967 during the construction of the Fourvière tunnel.

The buildings on the south side of the street were bought by the city to create the new Montée de Choulans. They are all located at number 3 and include a building with seven apartments for a total of seventeen residents, as well as two commercial premises belonging to the companies Mokarex (wholesale cafés) and Georges Casson (funeral wreaths).

== Description ==
Location of the Montée Saint-Clair-Duport before demolition.

The Montée Saint-Clair-Duport was a street 60 meters long and 10 meters wide that started at the Quai Fulchiron, almost opposite the Kitchener-Marchand Bridge, and ended with a staircase that led to the intersection of the Rue de la Quarantaine and the Rue des Étroits.

== Excavations ==
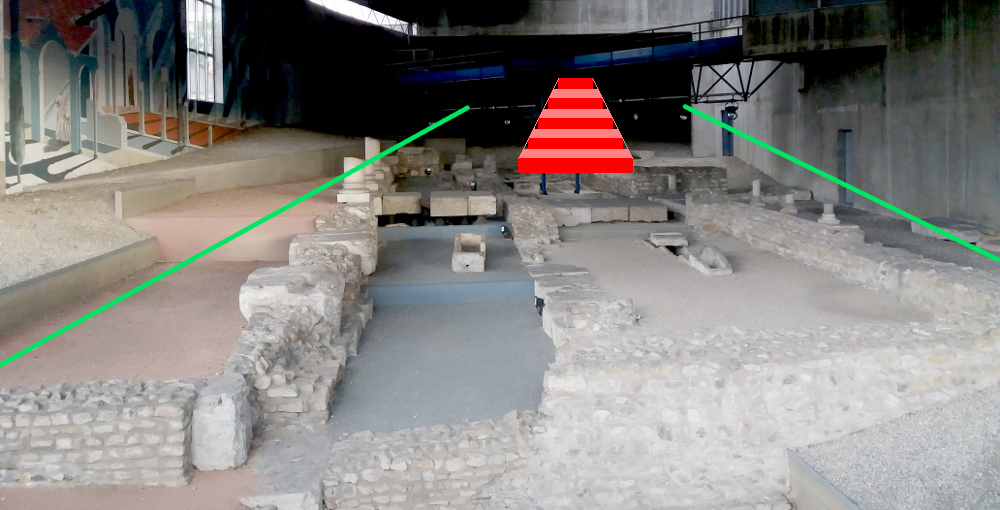
Route of the Montée Saint-Clair-Duport above the ruins of the basilica. Roadway limits Stairs

In 1947, during the laying of a telephone line in the Montée Saint-Clair-Duport, historical remains were discovered. Excavations, financed thanks to the intervention of the mayor, Édouard Herriot, began in April the same year.

They uncovered a major necropolis containing Burgundian and Frankish bone remains, confirmed by funerary inscriptions: 35 skulls in good condition, 20 with mandibles, were exhumed. An ossuary dating from 1628 was found just below the roadway. It was completely crushed by the steamroller during the resurfacing of the ascent. Below, a layer dating from the 6th to the 17th century contained many basilica ruins and human remains. Deeper down were the pavements of the basilica, the necropolis with sarcophagi, and, in the oldest layer, Gallo-Roman remains.

== See also ==
- 5th arrondissement of Lyon
- List of streets and squares in Lyon

== Bibliography ==
- Reynaud, Jean-François (1998). Lugdunum christianum : Lyon du ive au viiie siècle : topographies, nécropoles et édifices religieux (in French). Paris: Éditions de la Maison des sciences de l’homme. ISBN 978-2-7351-0636-3.
- Valette, Robert Brun de la; Couty, Jean (1969). Lyon et ses rues (in French). Lyon: Fleuve.
- Vanario, Maurice (1990). Rues de Lyon : à travers les siècles (xive au xxie siècle) (in French). Lyon: Editions lyonnaises d'art et d'histoire. ISBN 9782905230355.
- Wuilleumier, Pierre; Audin, Amable; Leroi-Gourhan, André (1949). L'église et la nécropole Saint-Laurent dans le quartier lyonnais de Choulans : Étude archéologique et étude anthropologique (in French). Lyon: Audin.
- Direction départementale de l'équipement (1962–1967). Tunnel de Fourvière à Lyon (Archives du Rhône, 3521 W 1) (in French). Ville de Lyon.
- Direction départementale de l'équipement (1963–1968). Tunnel de Fourvière à Lyon (PDF). Archives du Rhône, 3521 W 5 (in French). Ville de Lyon.
