= Jacques-Germain Soufflot =

French architect (1713–1780)

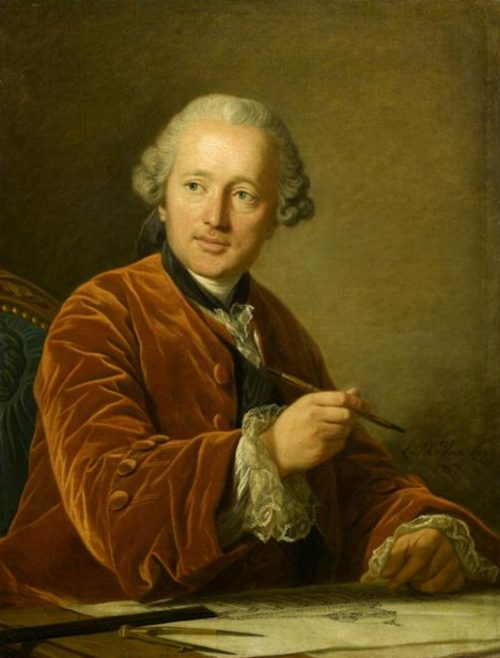
- Born: 22 July 1713; Irancy, Kingdom of France
- Died: 29 August 1780 (aged 67); Paris, Kingdom of France
- Occupation: Architect

Jacques-Germain Soufflot (French pronunciation: [ʒak ʒɛʁmɛ̃ suflo], 22 July 1713 – 29 August 1780) was a French architect in the international circle that introduced neoclassicism. His most famous works are the Panthéon in Paris, built from 1755 onwards, originally as a church dedicated to Saint Genevieve, and the Hôtel-Dieu de Lyon in Lyon.

== Biography ==
Soufflot was born in Irancy, near Auxerre. In the 1730s he attended the French Academy in Rome, where young French students in the 1750s would later produce the first full-blown generation of Neoclassical designers. Soufflot's models were less the picturesque Baroque being built in modern Rome, as much as the picturesque aspects of monuments of antiquity.

After returning to France, Soufflot practiced in Lyon, where he built the Hôtel-Dieu, like a chaste riverside street facade, interrupted by the central former chapel, its squared dome with illusionistic diminishing coffers on the interior. With the Temple du Change, he was entrusted with completely recasting a 16th-century market exchange building housing a meeting space housed above a loggia. Soufflot's newly made loggia is an unusually severe arcading tightly bound between flat Doric pilasters, with emphatic horizontal lines. He was accepted into the Lyon Academy. While in Lyon, Soufflot also employed the artist and scenographer Jean-Antoine Morand to produce the sets and stage machinery for the city's new theater, the Grand Théâtre de Lyon, which opened in 1756.

A more creative trip to Italy was made when the mature Soufflot returned in 1750 in the company of the future Marquis de Marigny, the talented young brother of Madame de Pompadour, who was being groomed for his future as director of the King's Buildings (Bâtiments du Roi). On this trip Soufflot made a special study of theaters. In 1755 Marigny, the new Director General of Royal Buildings, gave Soufflot architectural control of all the royal buildings in Paris. In the same year, he was admitted to the Royal Academy of Architecture. In 1756 his opera house opened in Lyon.

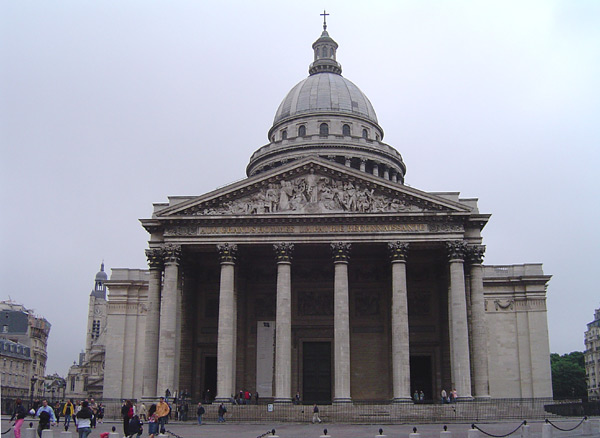
The Panthéon, Paris

The Panthéon is his most famous work, but the Hôtel Marigny built for his young patron (1768–1771) across from the Élysée Palace, is a better definition of Soufflot's personal taste. Soufflot died in Paris in 1780, and is buried in the Panthéon next to Voltaire.

Like all the architects of his day, Soufflot considered the classical idiom essential. He stood out for his "strictness of line, firmness of form, simplicity of contour, and rigorously architectonic conception of detail" which contrasted sharply with the late Baroque and Rococo architecture of his contemporaries.
