= Saint-Paul (Lyon) =

Coordinates: 45°45′58″N 4°49′38″E

Saint-Paul pronounced [sɛ̃.pɔl] is a quarter located in the 5th arrondissement of Lyon, France. It was named after the parish church. Located in the perimeter saved registered to the UNESCO World Heritage Site, it is one of the three parishes of the Vieux Lyon, the historic center of the city. The quarter is mainly served by the line C3 of the transports en commun lyonnais and the train station named Gare de Lyon-Saint-Paul. In 1880, the statue of Chancellor Gerson, sculpted by the burgomaster of Liège, Charles Bailly, was installed rue Saint-Paul, in front of the church.

== Notable buildings and structures ==
Among its notable buildings are :

- the Église Saint-Paul
- many traboules
- rue Lainerie, a paved pedestrian street
- rue Juiverie, a pedestrian street
- the hôtel Bullioud, built by architect Philibert Delorme, in 1536

== Photos ==
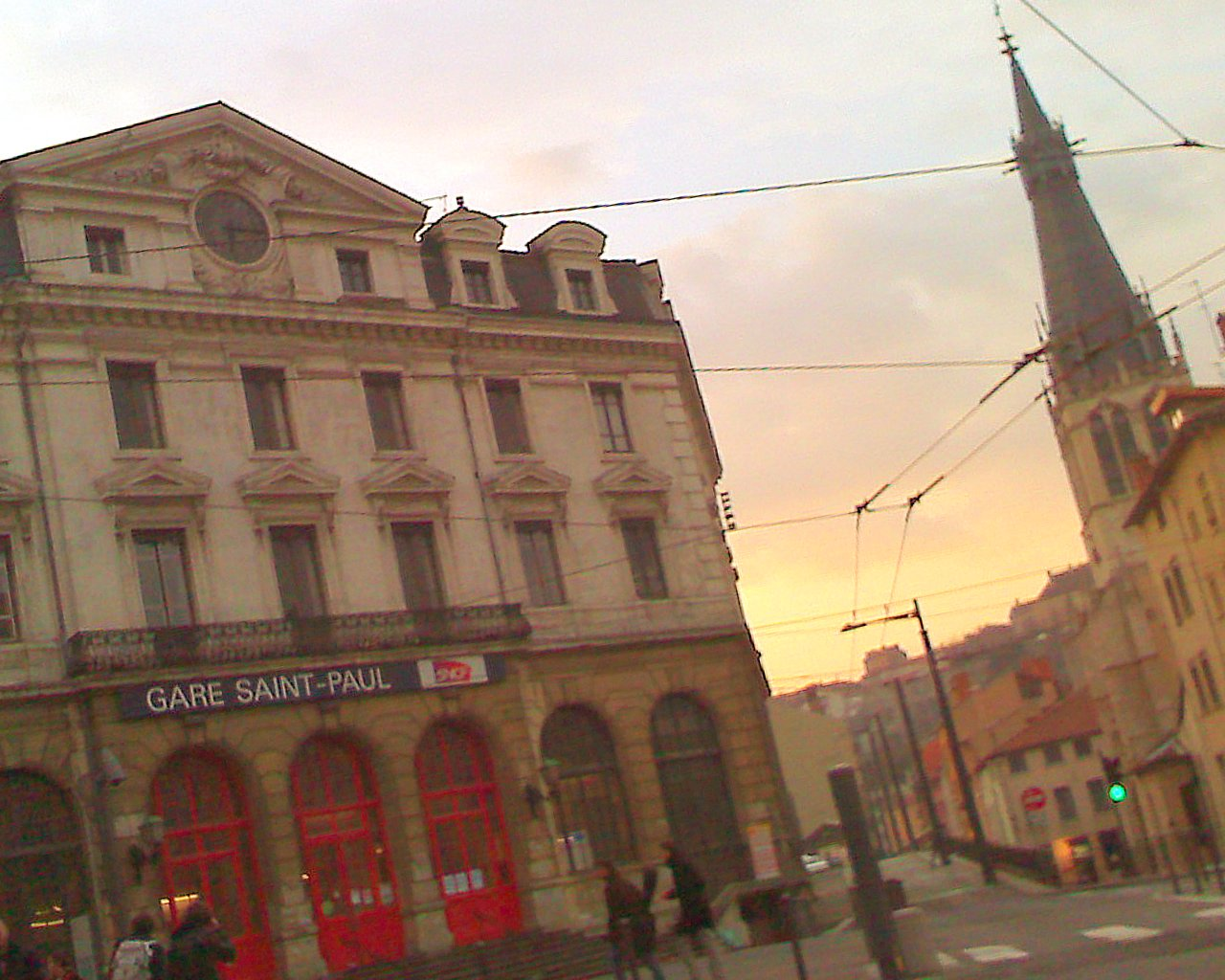
Gare Saint-Paul and Église Saint-Paul

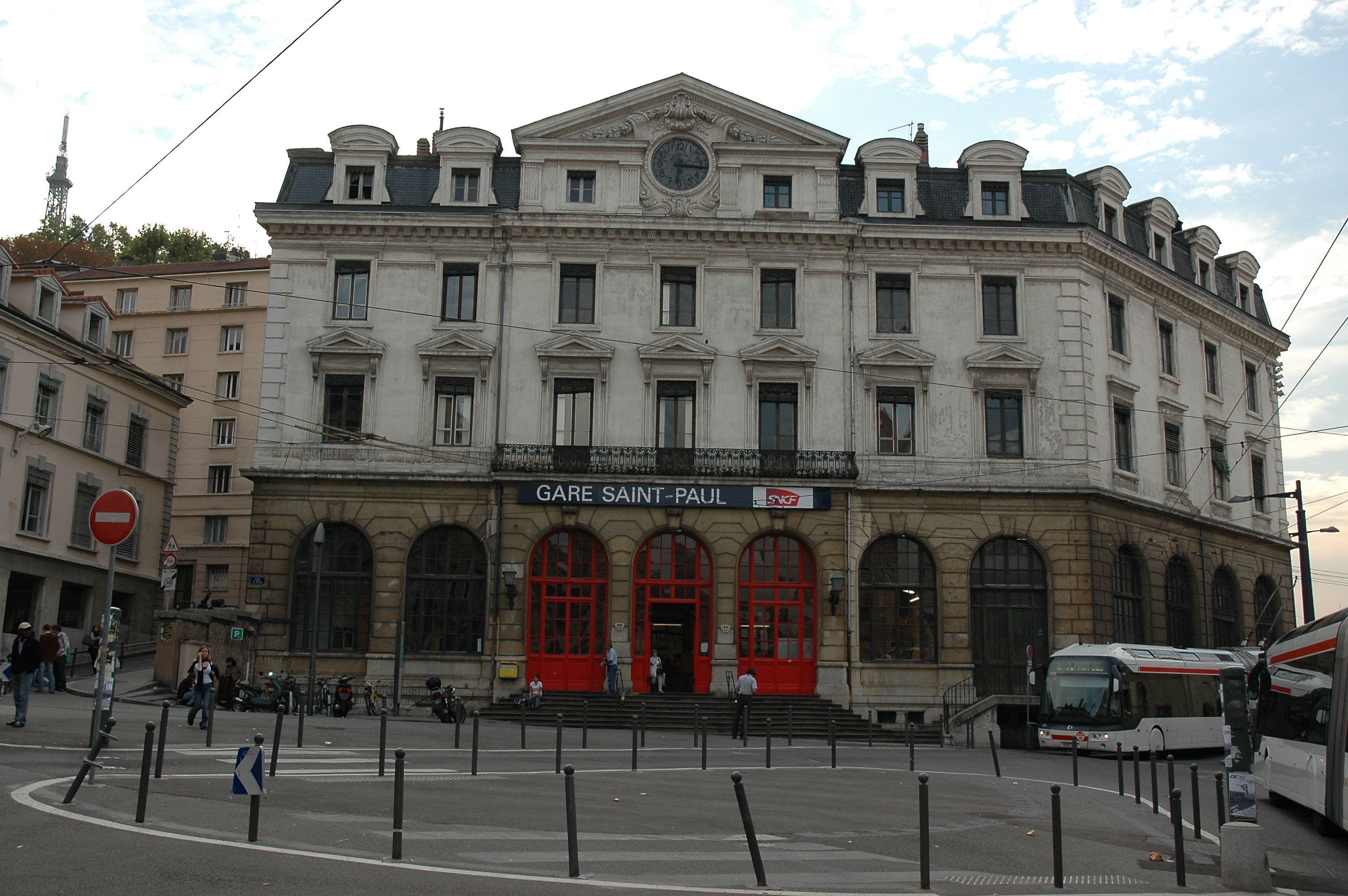
Gare Saint-Paul, facade

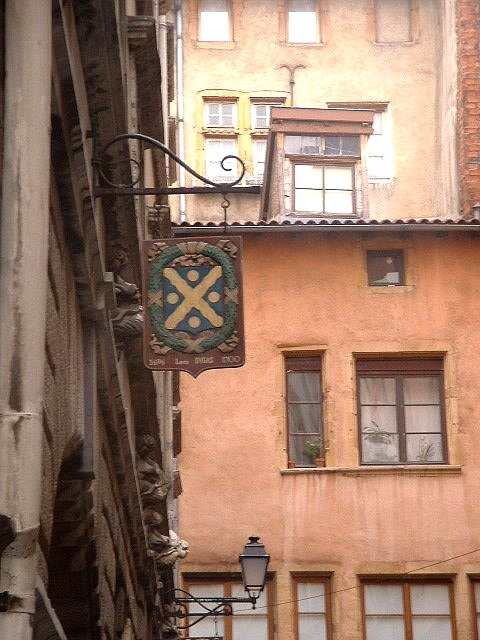
Rue Juiverie
