= Rue Lainerie =

Street in the 5th arrondissement of Lyon, France

Coordinates: 45°45′54″N 4°49′41″E

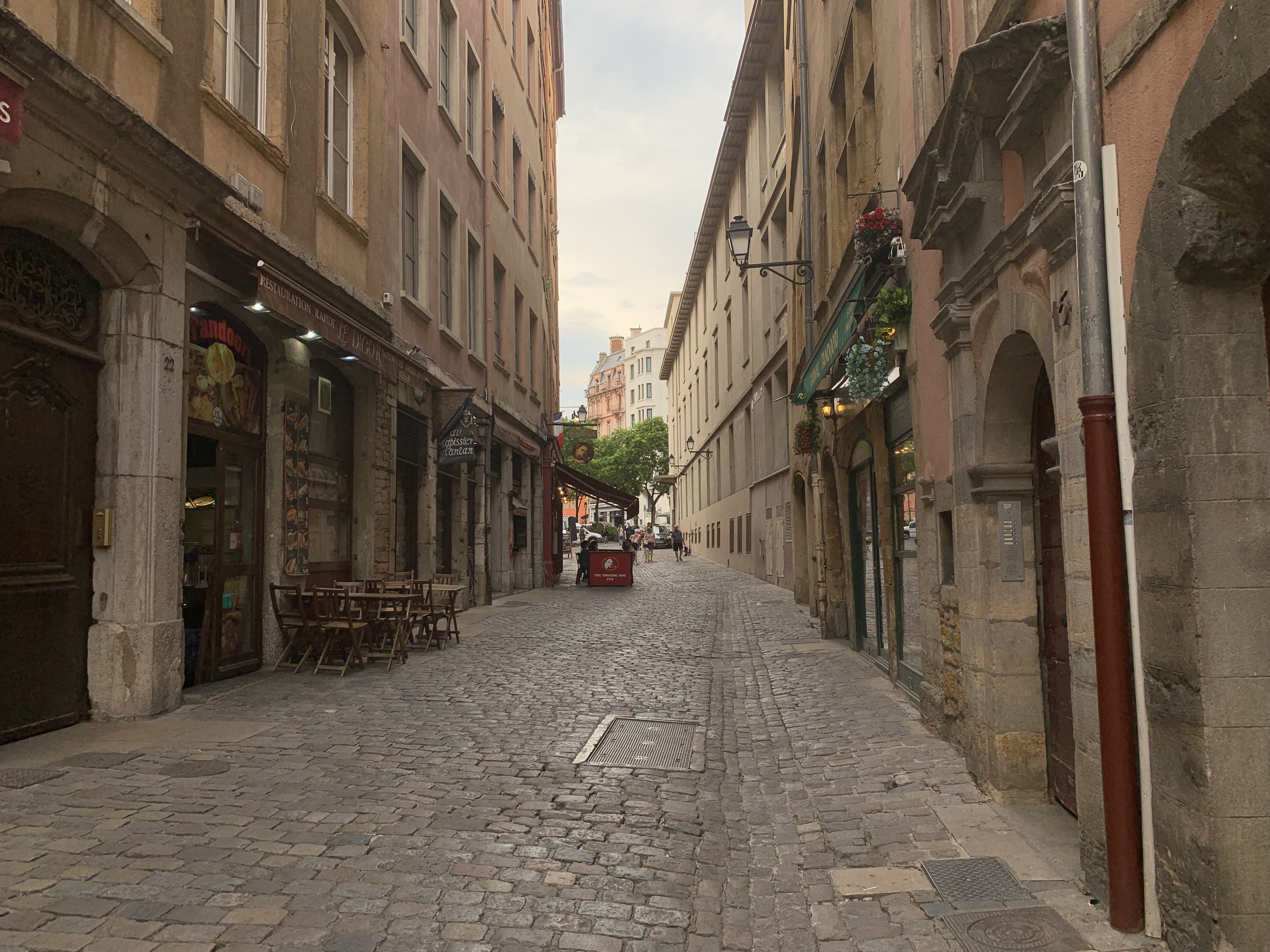
- Rue Lainerie, June 2019
- Former name(s): Rue de l'Asnerie
- Type: Street
- Location: 5th arrondissement of Lyon, Lyon, France
- Postal code: 69005

Construction
- Construction start: 5th century
- Completion: 1911

The Rue Lainerie (French pronunciation: [ʁy lɛnʁi]) is an ancient cobbled pedestrian street of the Vieux Lyon quarter, in the 5th arrondissement of Lyon. From north to south, it connects two quarters, Saint-Paul and Saint-Jean, and more precisely the Place du Change and the Place Saint-Paul. There is currently an academy of music (section Vieux Lyon) at No. 1 and many hotels. The street is served by many buses (29-30-31-44-184), two metro stations and a velo'v station. It belongs to the zone classified as World Heritage Site by UNESCO.

== History ==
The layout of the Rue Lainerie dates back the early Middle Ages and was completed in 1911. There are several possible spellings : Rue de l'Asnerie or Rue Laisnerie, these names do not refer to the trade or craft of wool, but to a stable for asses which was in the street when it was created. During the Renaissance, the street was inhabited by wealthy people: for example, in No. 14 lived in a wealthy family of magistrates, the Palmier, later replaced by Claude de Bourg who modernized the street in 1510. Thus, the architecture of the street offers a mixture of gothism and Renaissance style. In the eighteenth century, the community of Jansenists tailors were at No.5. The school of the street was built in the 19th century. In its northern part, at the junction with the Rue François Vernay, several old houses were razed in 1911, under the mandate of President Édouard Herriot, during development works of the district which included the construction of the Gare de Lyon-Saint-Paul (1874) and the Palais de Bondy, housing the Salle Molière (1904).

== Traboules ==
Several of the paths on the street are open to visitors. At No. 4, there is a façade of the sixteenth century, at No. 6, a façade of the fifteenth century, at No. 10, two staircases placed side by side and a gallery (this traboule signed an agreement with the city of Lyon for its opening), at No. 14, the gothic façade of the Mayet de Beauvoir house, built in 1516 decorated with protruding flowers, mullioned windows, arches, medallions, a statue of the Virgin, and at No. 18, a nice staircase and a building with an arched driveway with rib vaults that fall on caps adorned with angels, devils or animals.

== See also ==
- Traboule
