= Manécanterie, Lyon =

Manécanterie
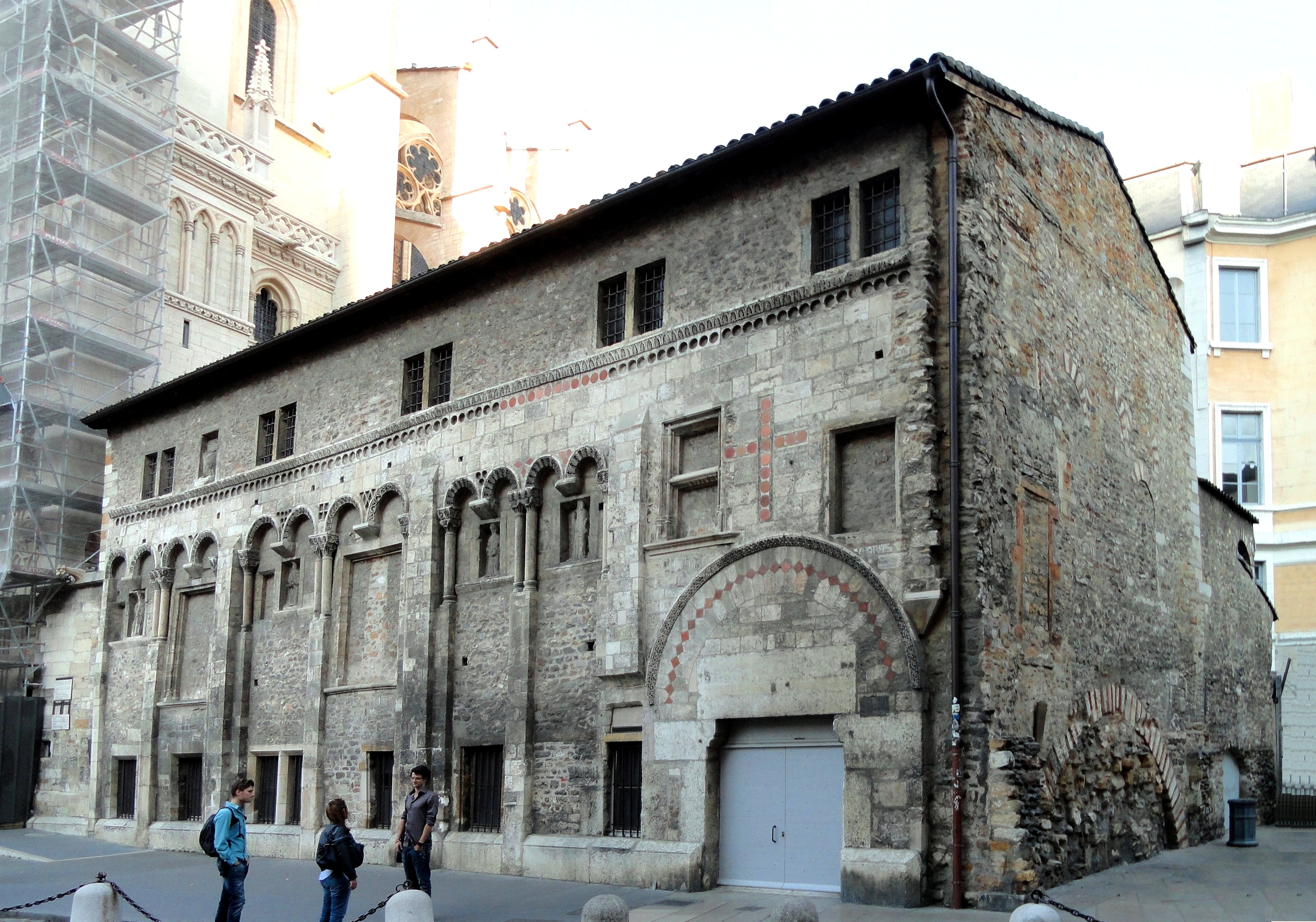
- Interactive map of the Manécanterie area

General information
- Architectural style: Romanesque
- Location: 5th arrondissement of Lyon, Lyon, France
- Coordinates: 45°45′38.25″N 4°49′36.5″E
- Owner: French government

The Manécanterie (English: Parish choir school) is an ancient monument situated in Lyon in Saint Jean district, in the 5th arrondissement of Lyon. It is placed side by side to the south southwest of the cathedral Saint Jean and is a part of the former convent of the cathedral. This small Romanesque building served first as dining hall to the canons of Saint Jean, before becoming a parish choir school, namely a school for the singing of the clergy. In 1998, it was inscribed on the UNESCO World Heritage List along with other notable buildings in historic Lyon as a testimony to Lyon's long history and unique architecture.

The Parish choir school is probably the oldest building of Lyon, with the exception of the Roman buildings. It was built in the 11th century, in a style mixing the Gothic and Romanesque influences, but it is based on constructions of the 2nd, and 8th centuries. It was successively transformed throughout the late Middle Ages and the modern time, particularly because the roadway of the Place Saint Jean was raised twice.

The Parish choir school, and particularly the sculptures of the saints, underwent damages by the troops of François de Beaumont, baron des Adrets, during the siege of Lyon in 1562 by the Protestants. From the 16th to the 18th century, the building had many architectural modifications, including the drilling of Gothic windows, the addition of a floor above the frieze, the transformation of the ground floor into shops, and the filling of certain arches. In the 18th century, the building became a parish choir school, and during the French Revolution, it became the national property.

In 1806, the parish bought the building to house the altar boys. The building that was to the south was destroyed in 1809 to build in its place an apartment building which was destroyed in 1866.

In 1862, it was classified as monument historique.

The current facade has a blind arcade overlaid with foliage, carried by small columns on pilasters. There are red bricks arranged in a geometrical way between the arcs and above.

From 1930, the building became the place of deposit, then a place of exhibition as museum, the Trésor de la Cathédrale de Saint-Jean, established during the 19th century by the cardinals Joseph Fesch and Louis Jacques Maurice de Bonald and which is composed of liturgical objects such as old books, jewelry, clothing and tapestry.
