= Vieux Lyon =

Historic Site of Lyon
UNESCO World Heritage Site
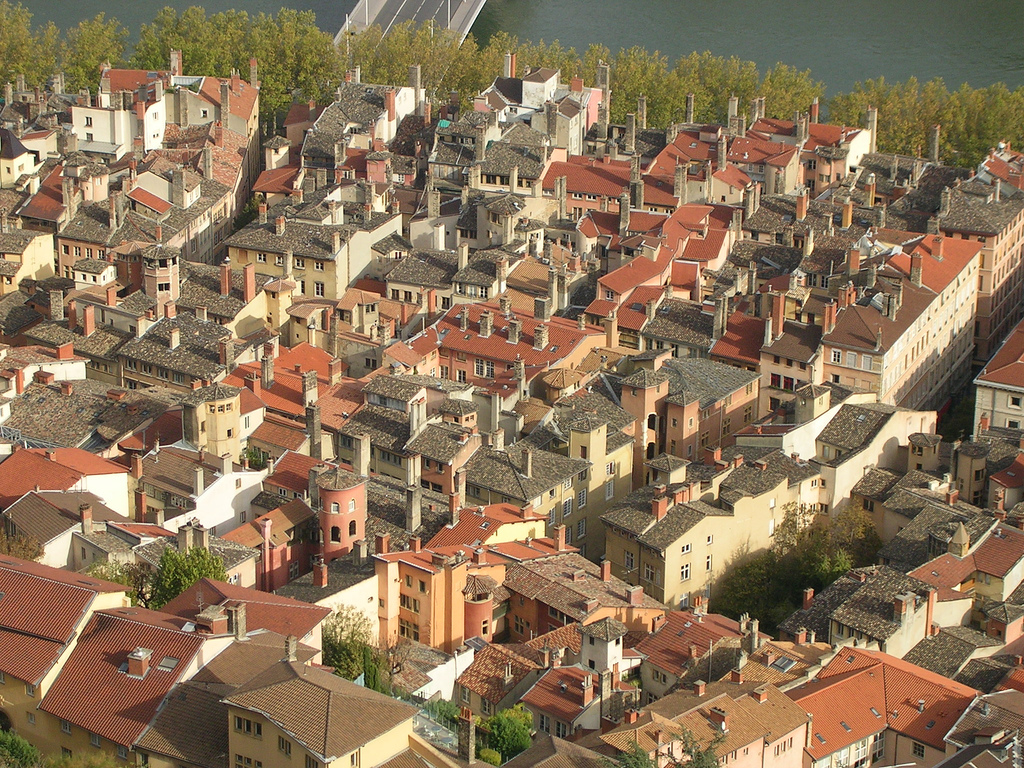

- Location within Metropole de Lyon Location within France
- Location: Lyon, Arrondissement of Lyon, Lyon Metropolis, Auvergne-Rhône-Alpes, France
- Criteria: Cultural: (ii), (iv)
- Reference: 872
- Inscription: 1998 (22nd Session)
- Area: 427 ha (1,060 acres)
- Buffer zone: 323 ha (800 acres)
- Coordinates: 45°45′44″N 4°49′36″E

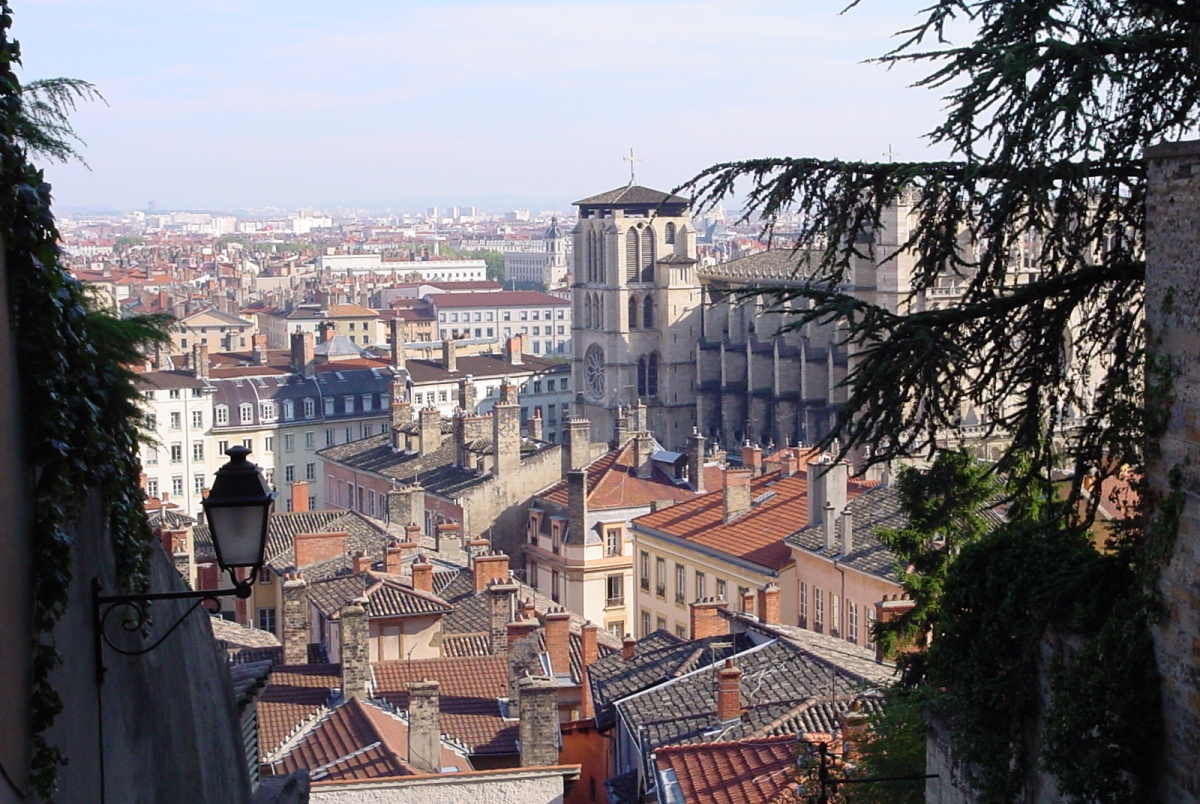
Saint-Jean quarter, part of the Vieux Lyon, with the Saint-Jean cathedral as seen from the montée des Chazeaux.

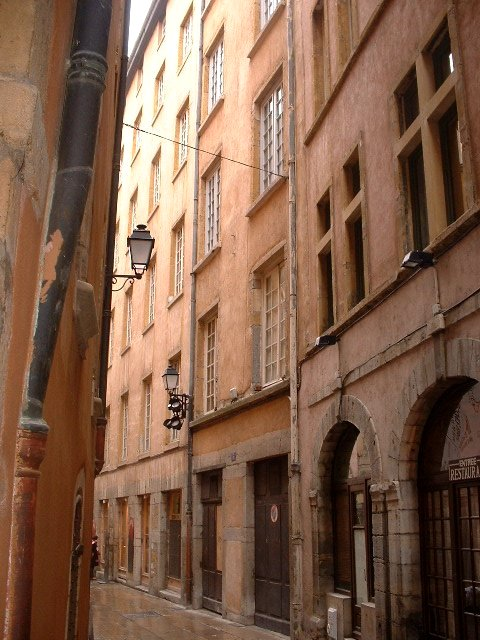
Rue de Gadagne in the heart of the Vieux Lyon.

Vieux Lyon (French pronunciation: [vjø ljɔ̃], lit. 'Old Lyon') is the largest Renaissance district of Lyon. In 1964, Vieux-Lyon, the city's oldest district, became the first site in France to be protected under the Malraux law to protect France's cultural sites. Covering an area of 24 hectares between the Fourvière hill and the river Saône, it is one of Europe's most extensive Renaissance neighborhoods. There are three distinct sections: Saint Jean, Saint Paul and Saint Georges. In 1998, Vieux Lyon was inscribed on the UNESCO World Heritage List along with other districts in Lyon because of its historical importance and architecture.

The Saint Jean quarter in the Middle Ages was the focus of political and religious power. The Cathedral of St Jean, seat of the archbishop of Lyon (also known as the Primate of Gaul), is a good example of Gothic architecture. The Manécanterie adjoining the cathedral is one of Lyon's few extant Romanesque buildings. Formerly a choir school, it now houses the museum of the cathedral's treasures. Saint Jean is also home to the Museum of Miniatures and Film Sets, located in a building that was the Golden Cross Inn in the 15th century.

The Saint-Paul section in the 15th and 16th centuries predominantly housed Italian banker-merchants. They moved into sumptuous urban residences here called hôtels particuliers. The Hôtel Bullioud and the Hôtel de Gadagne are two examples and the latter now houses the Lyon Historical Museum and the International Puppet Museum. The Loge du Change stands as testimony to the period when trade fairs made the city wealthy. The Saint Paul church, with its Romanesque lantern tower and its spire, mark the section's northern extremity.

The Saint Georges section was home to silk weavers, who settled in the section beginning in the 16th century. They later moved to the Croix Rousse hill in the 19th century. In 1844, the architect Pierre Bossan rebuilt the St George's Church on the banks of the Saône in a neo-Gothic style. In the Middle Ages, when there were only a few parallel streets between the hill and the Saône, the first traboules were built. Derived from the Latin trans-ambulare, meaning to pass through, traboules are corridors through buildings and their courtyards, connecting one street directly with another. A large number of galleries and spiral staircases remain in the traboules.

== Gallery ==
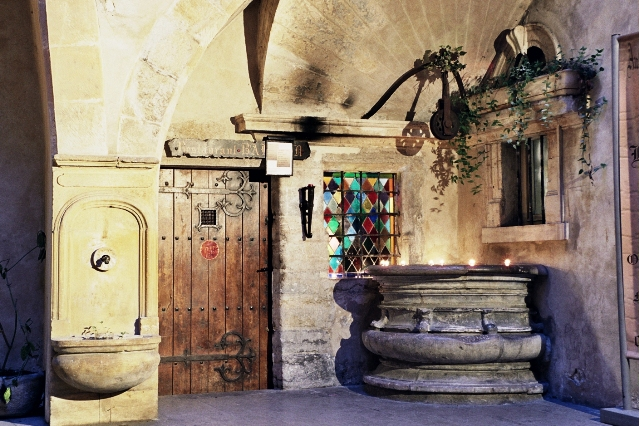
Well in Cour Philibert Delorme, rue Juiverie

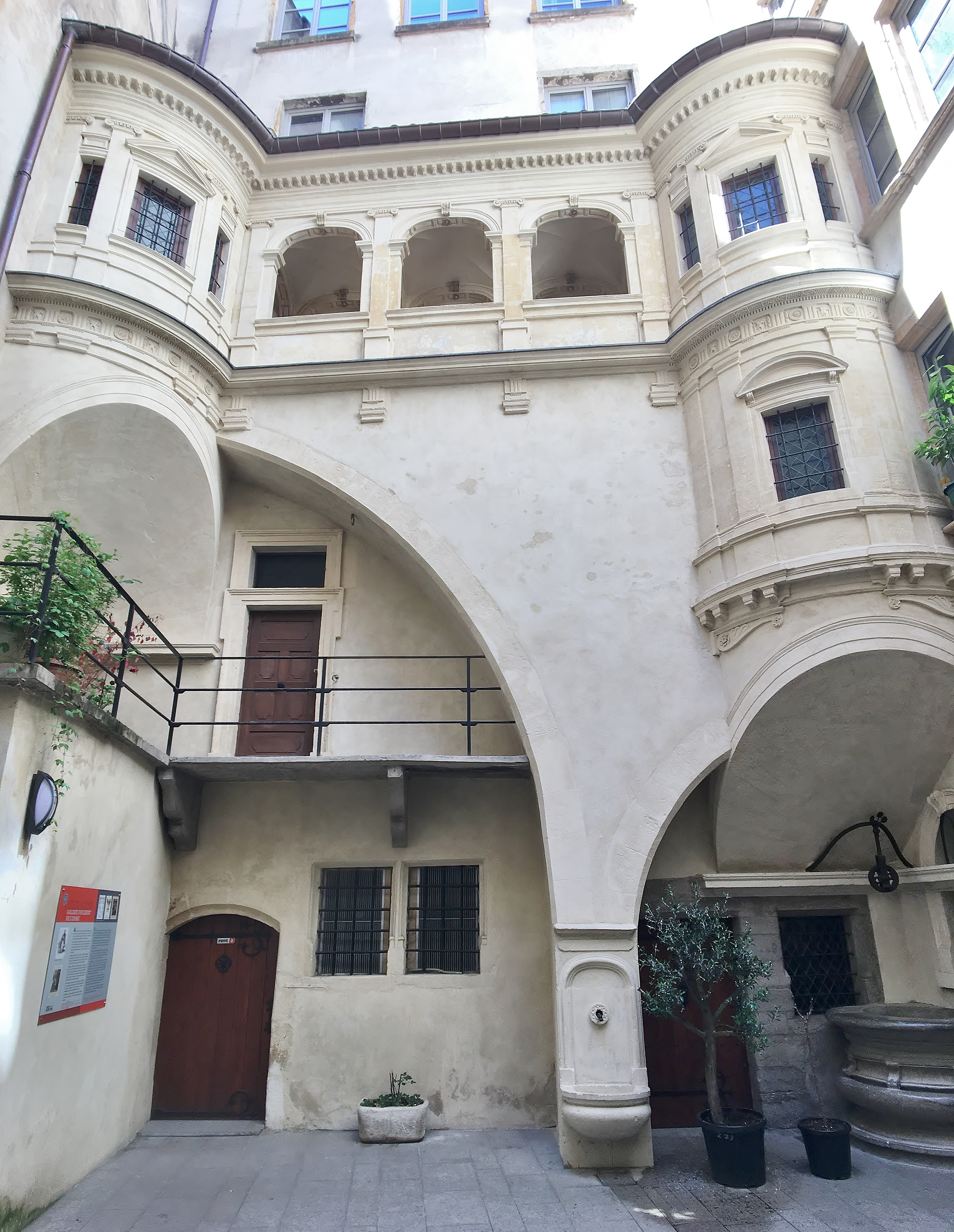
Hôtel de Bullioud, rue Juiverie

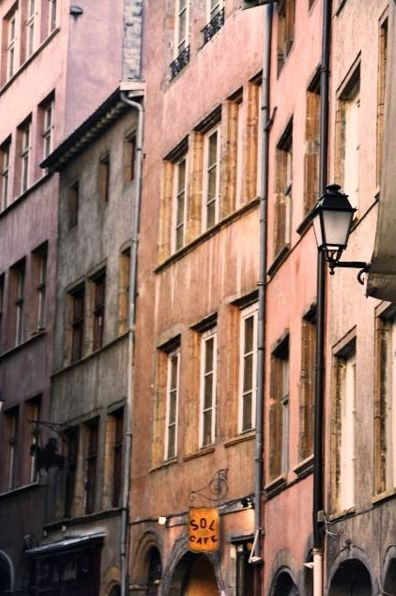
Buildings in the rue du Bœuf

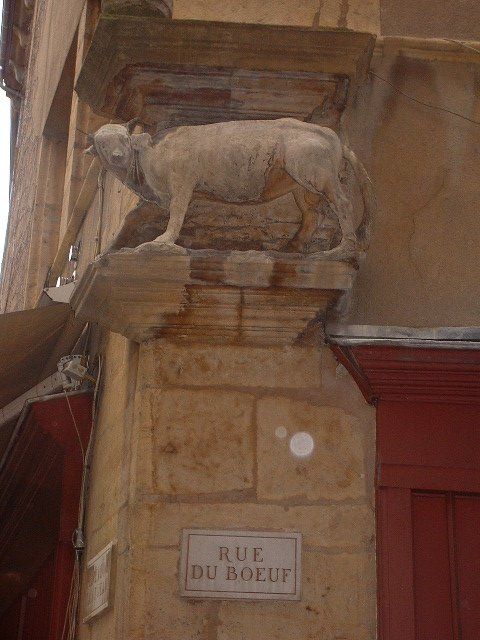
Statue at the corner of rue du Bœuf and Place neuve Saint Jean

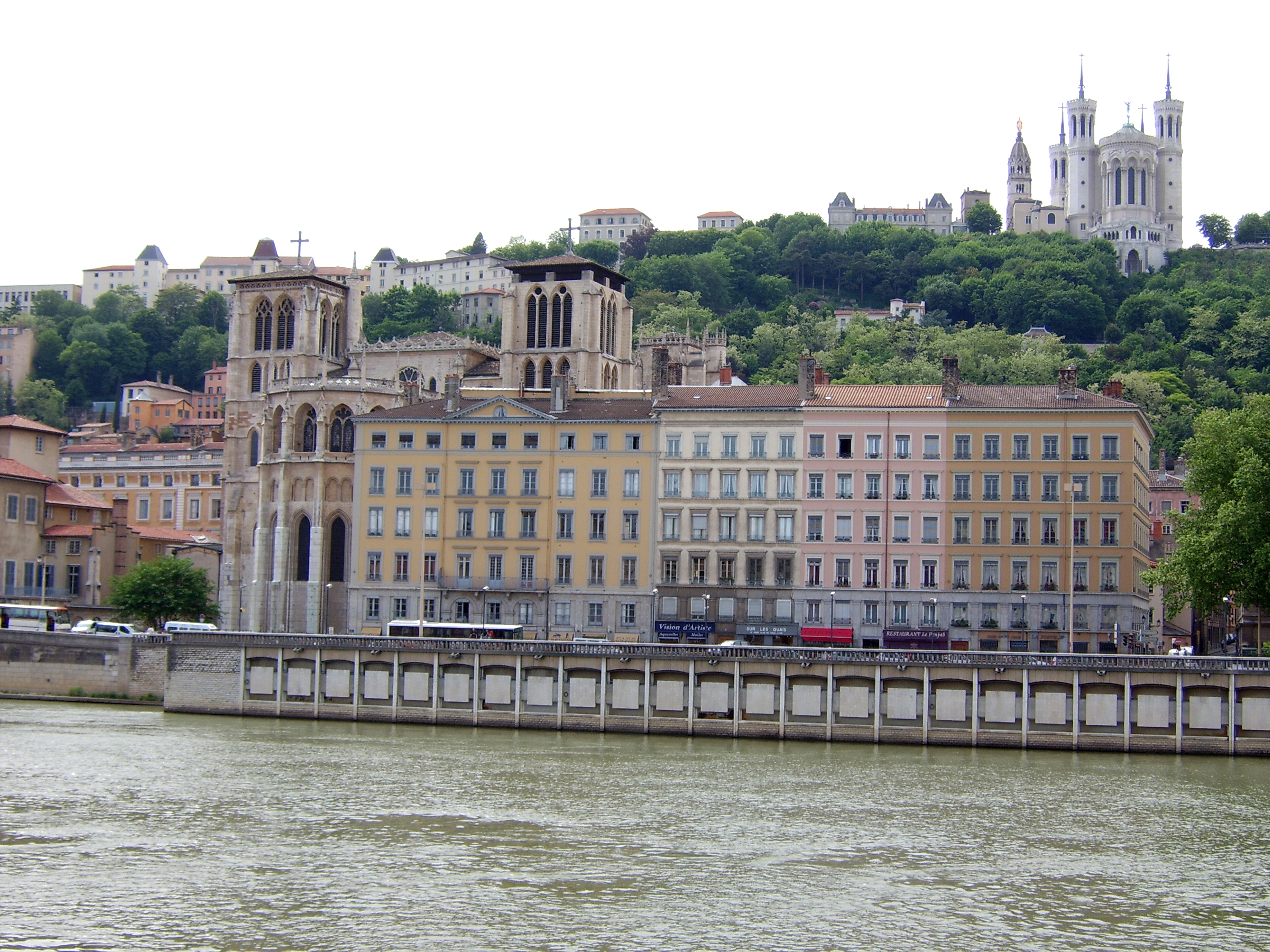
Lyon Cathedral and the Saône, in background the Fourvière hill

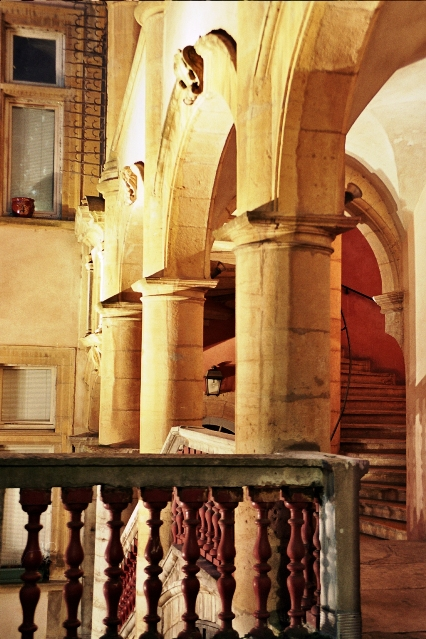
Building in Saint-Paul

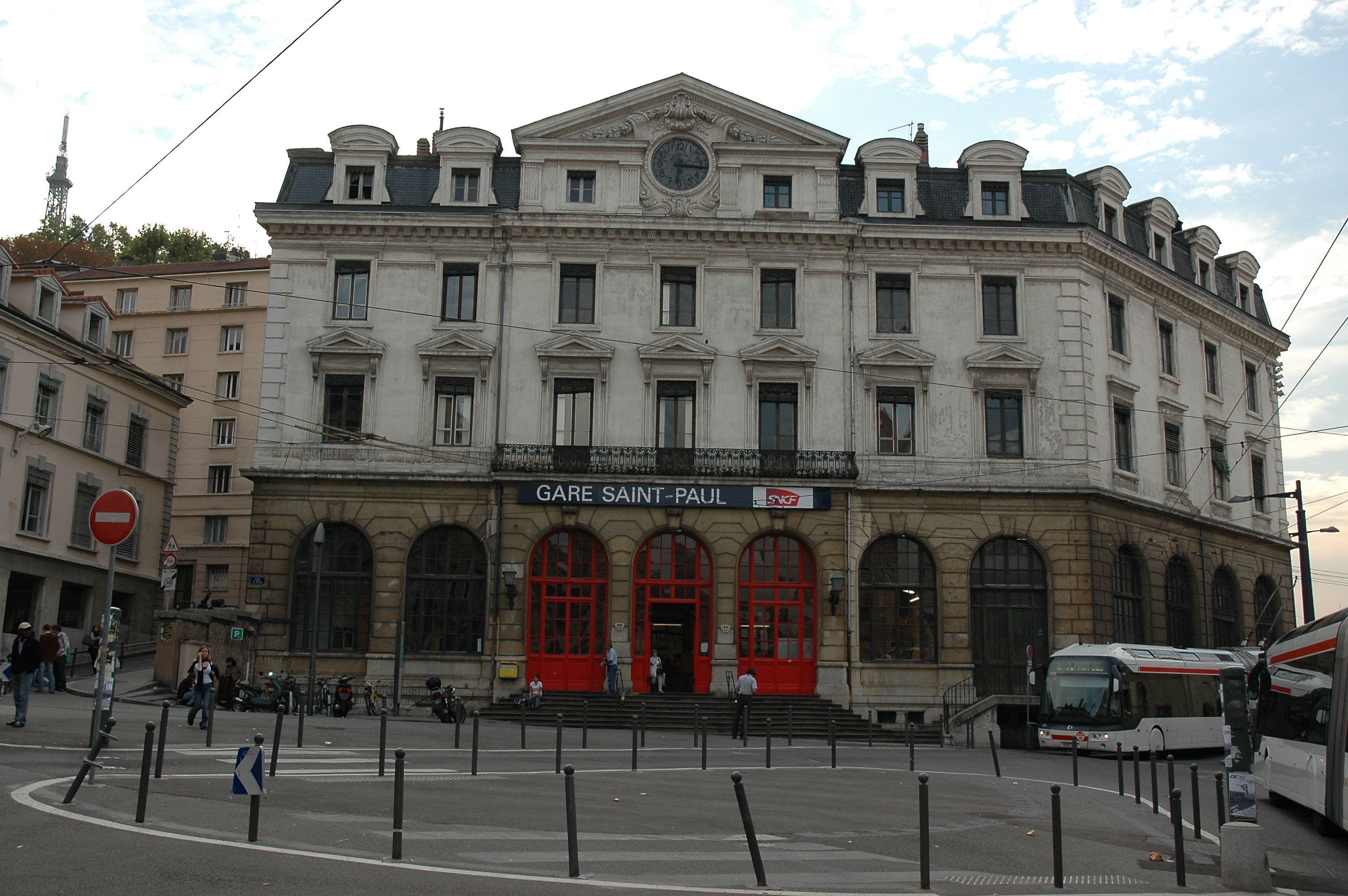
Gare Saint-Paul

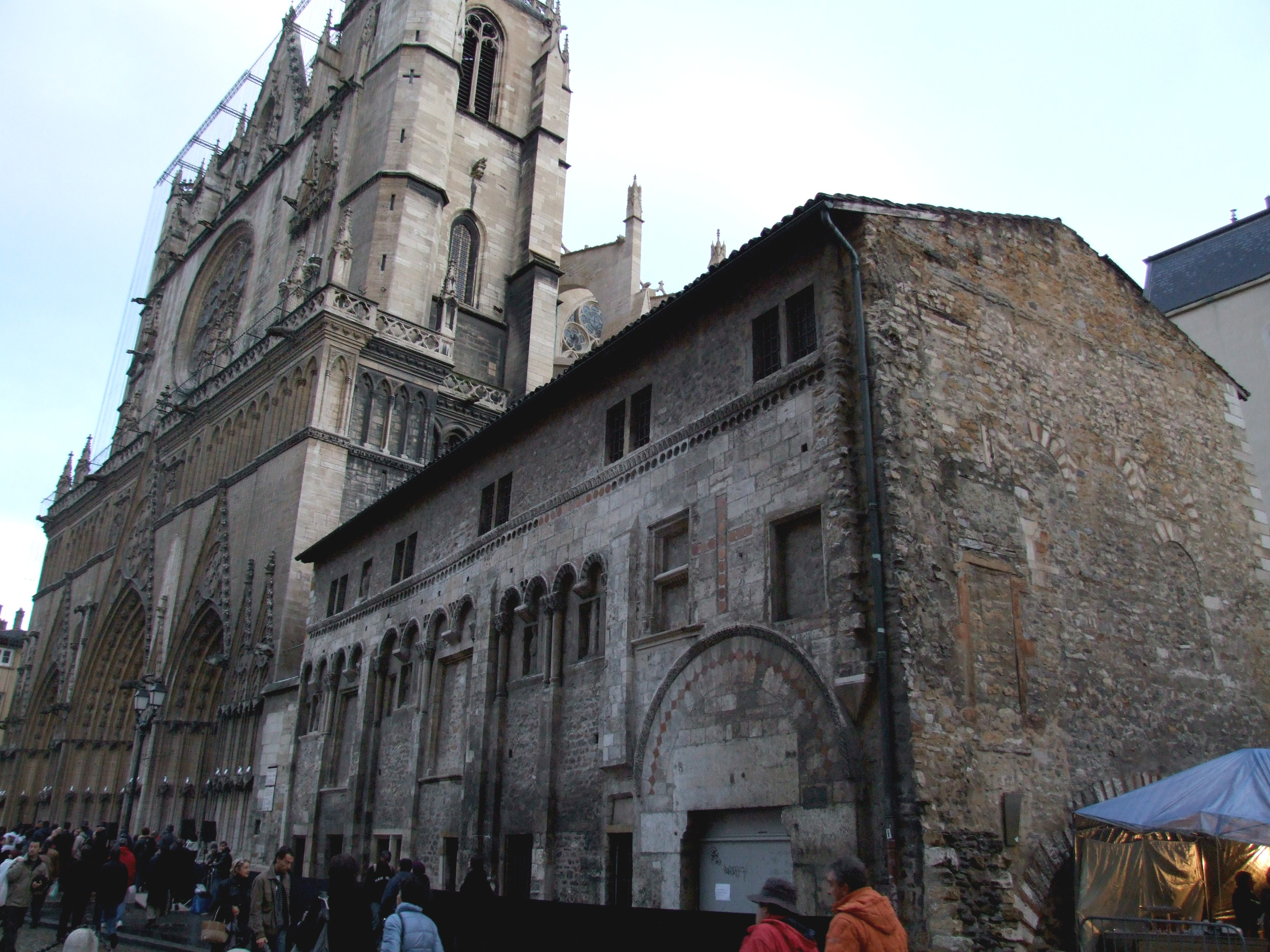
Cathedral and the manécanterie (one of the oldest buildings in Lyon)

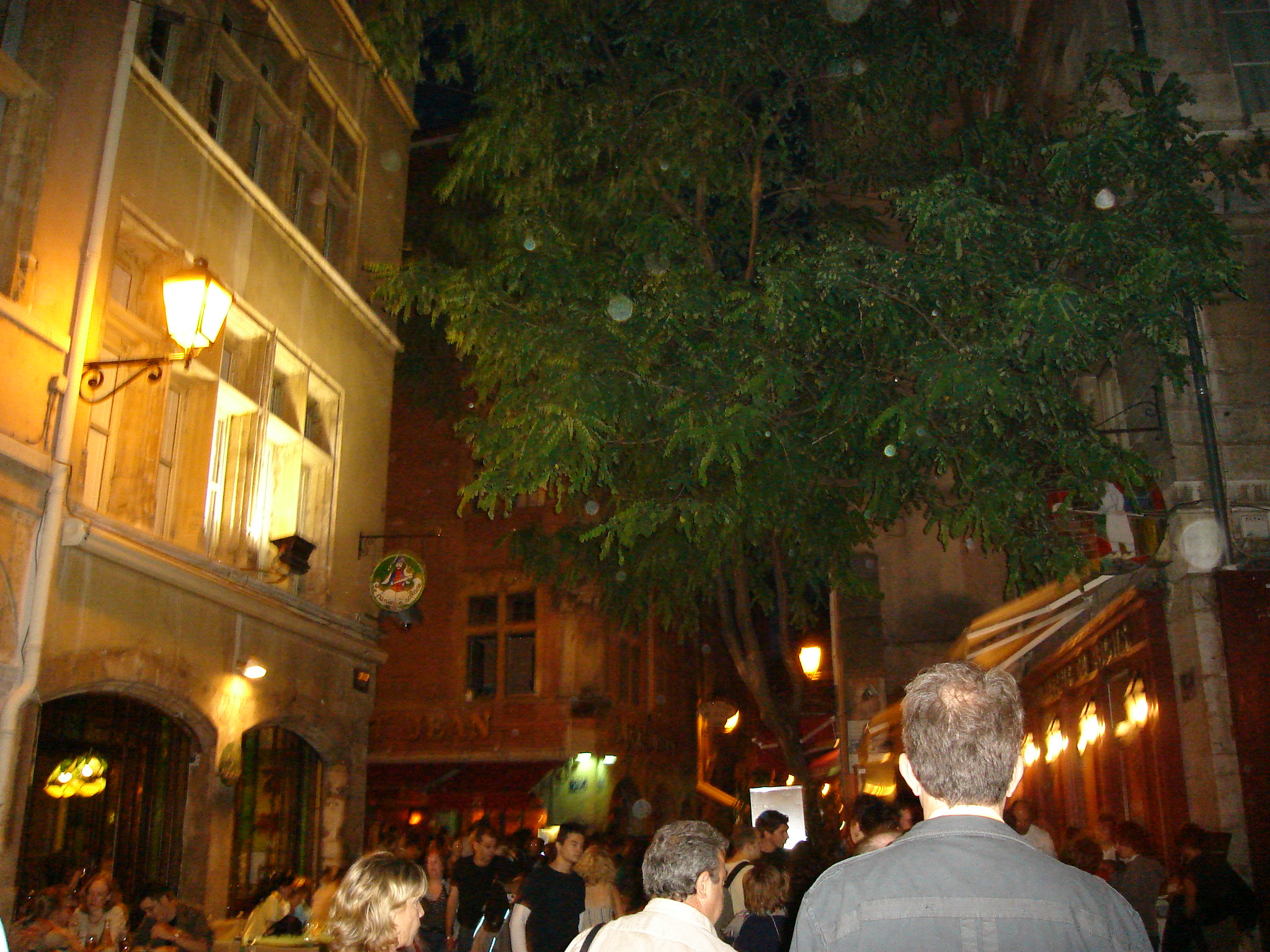
Rue Saint-Jean, the main street of Vieux Lyon

Chamarier house

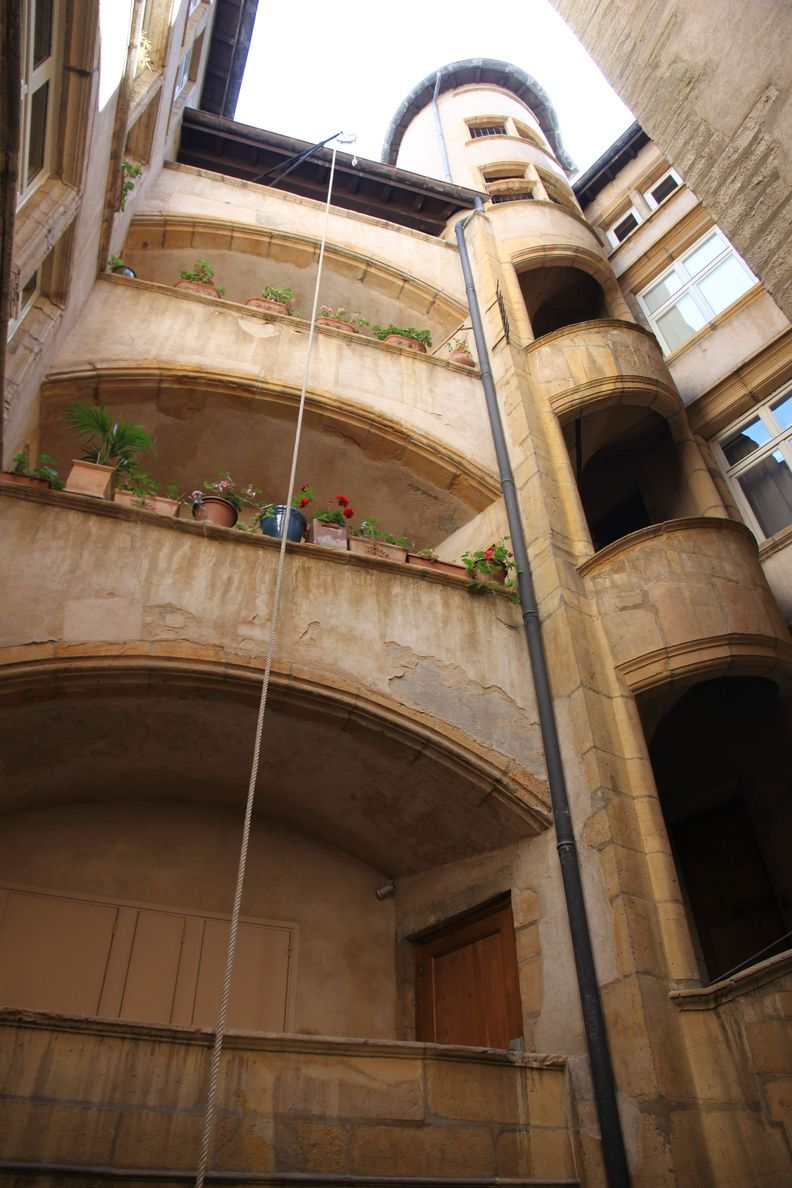
A courtyard and its staircase tower

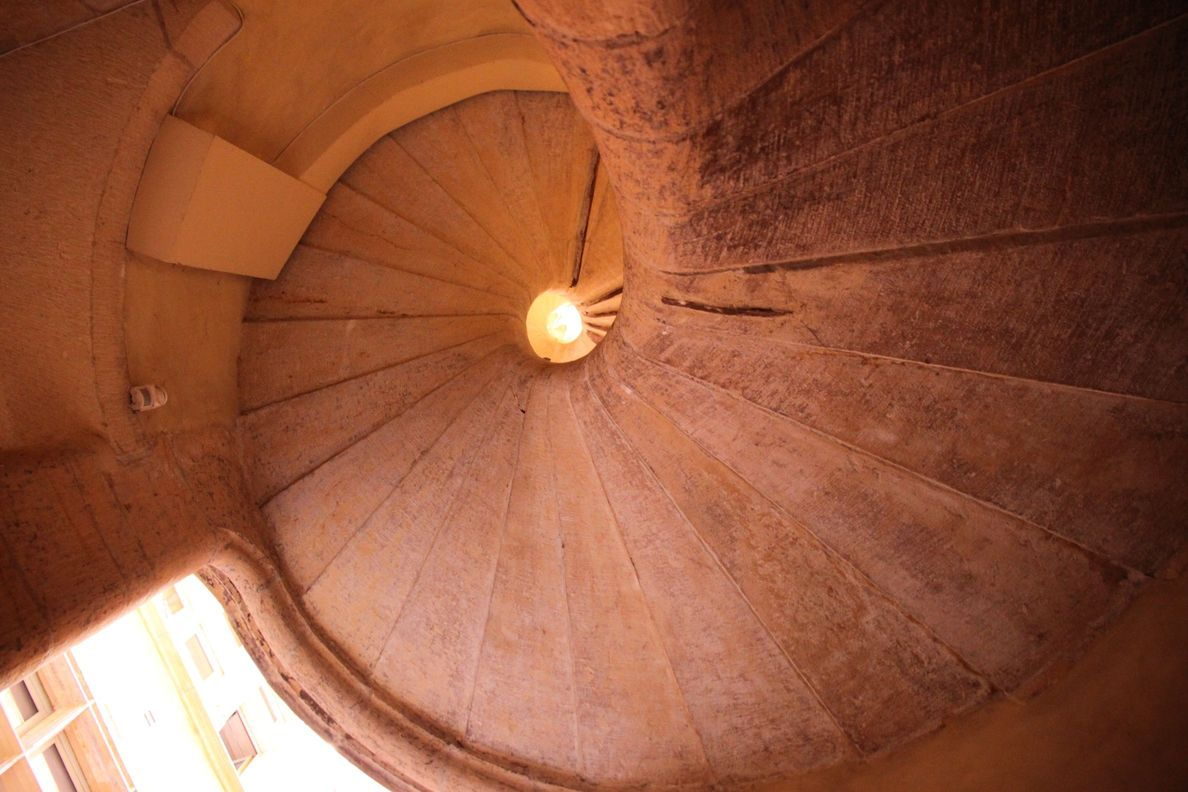
A staircase

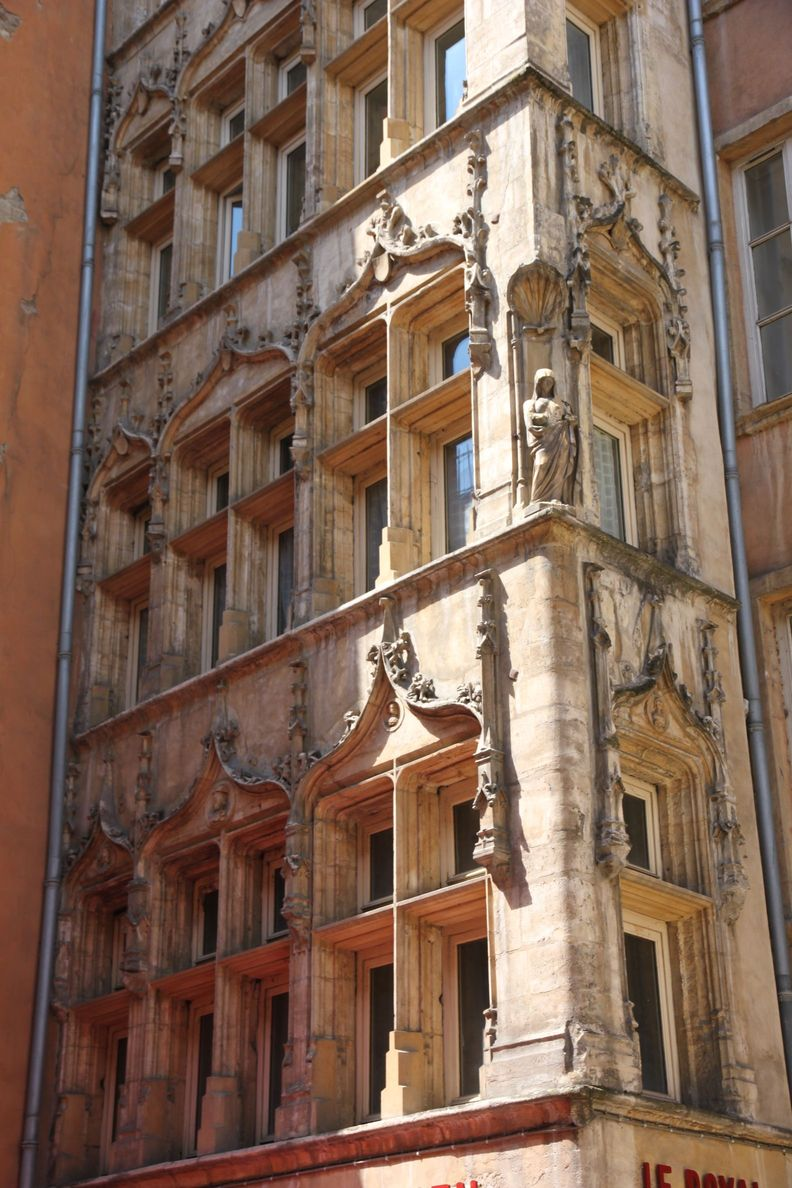
Windows in medieval style

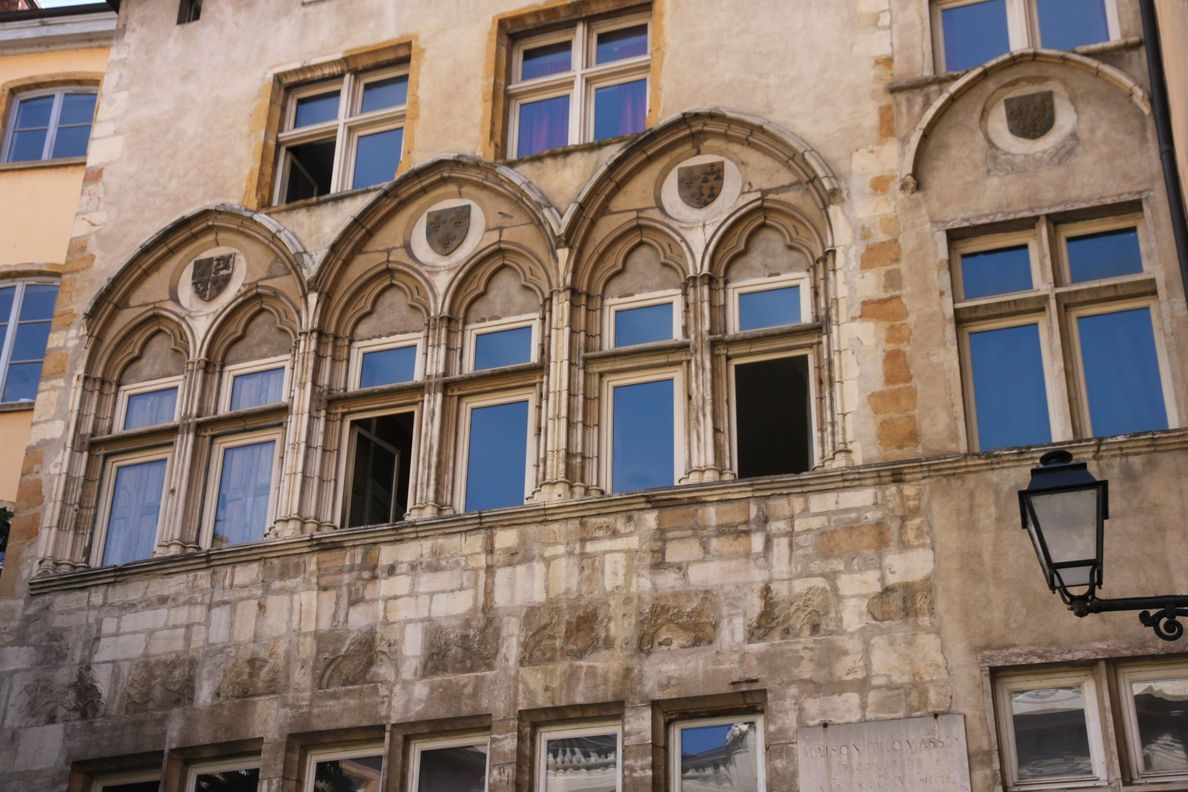
Windows in medieval style

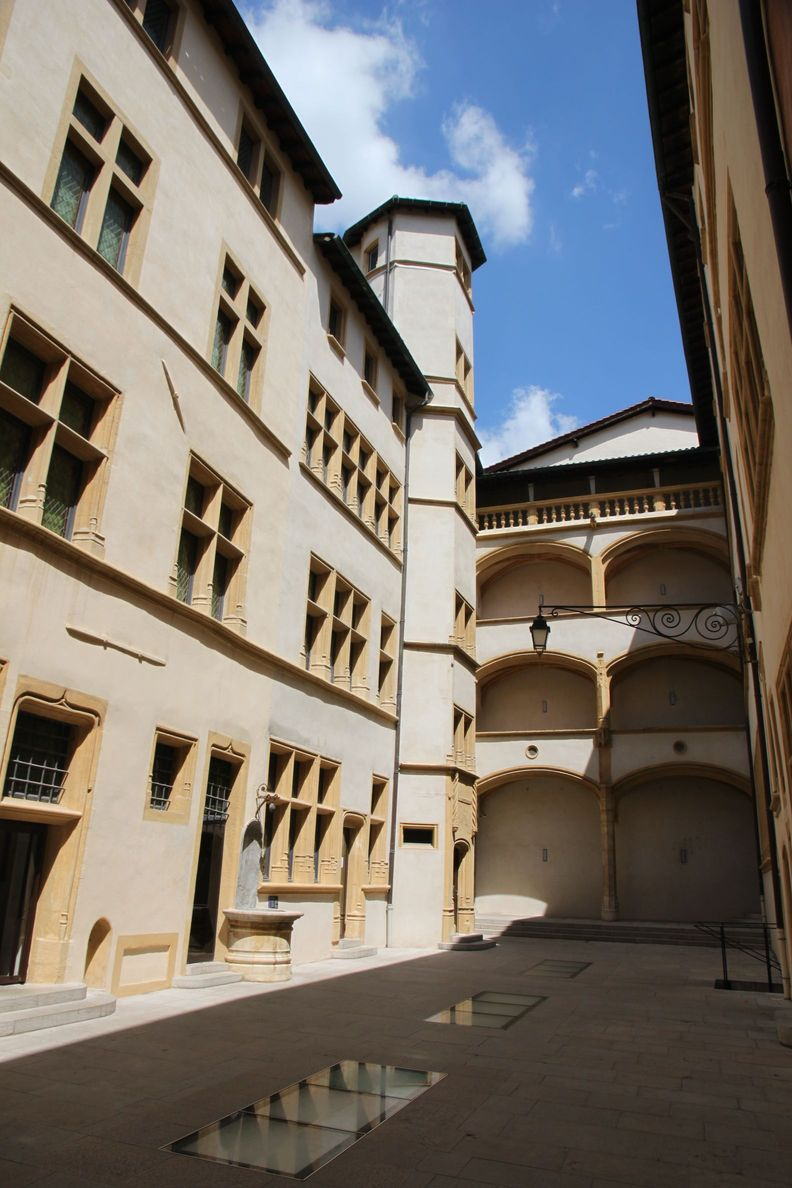
Hôtel de Gadagne

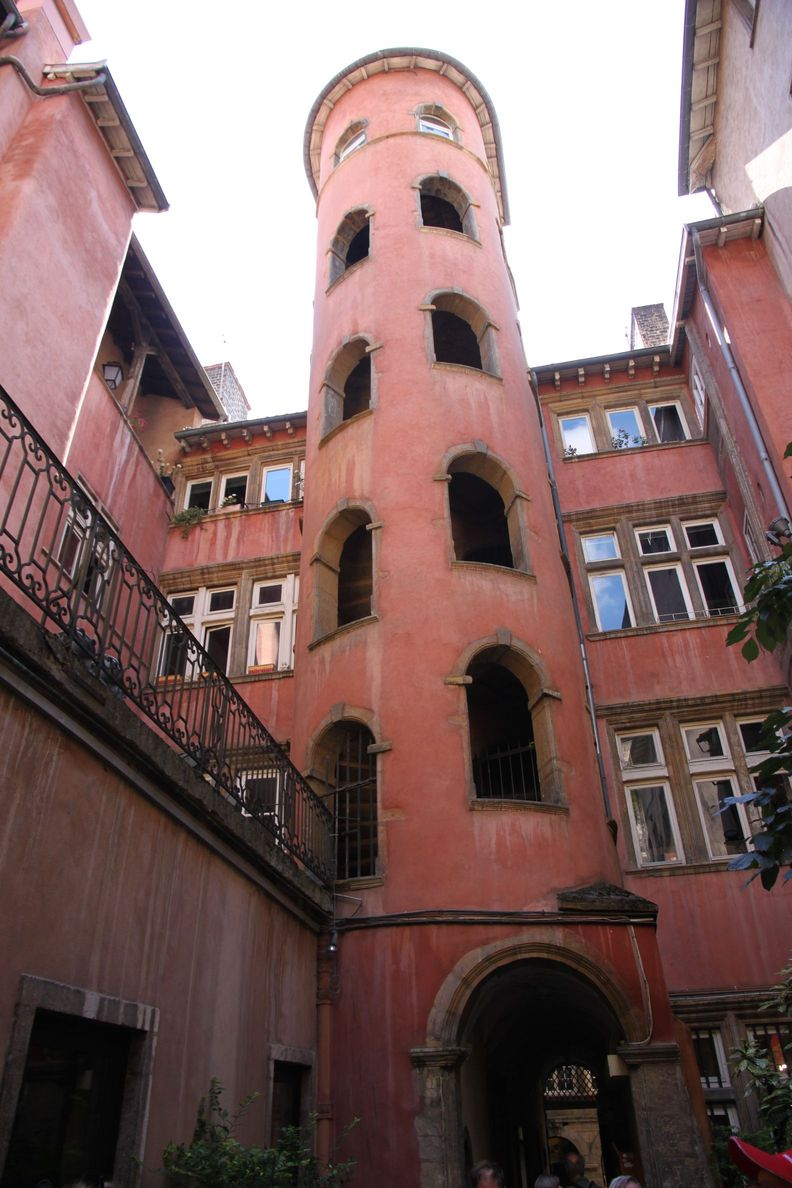
The 'tour rose' (pink tower)

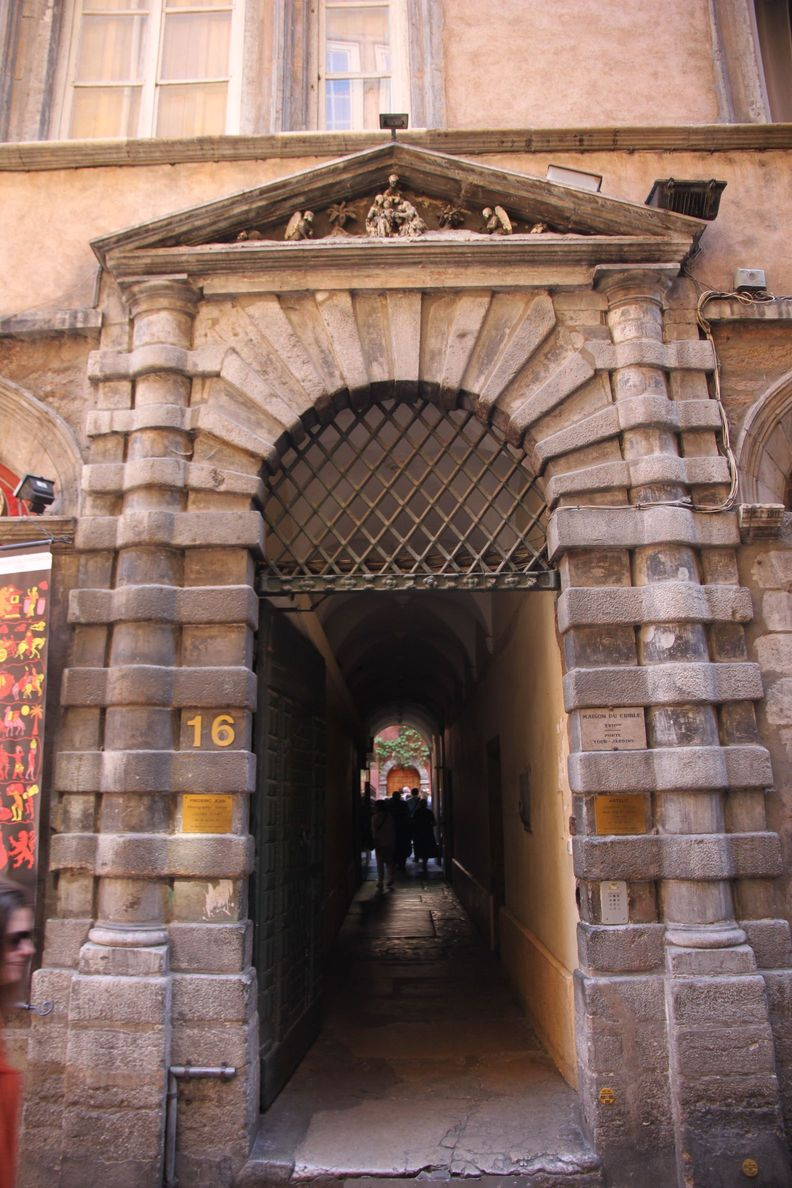
The main gate of the 'Tour rose' in Renaissance style

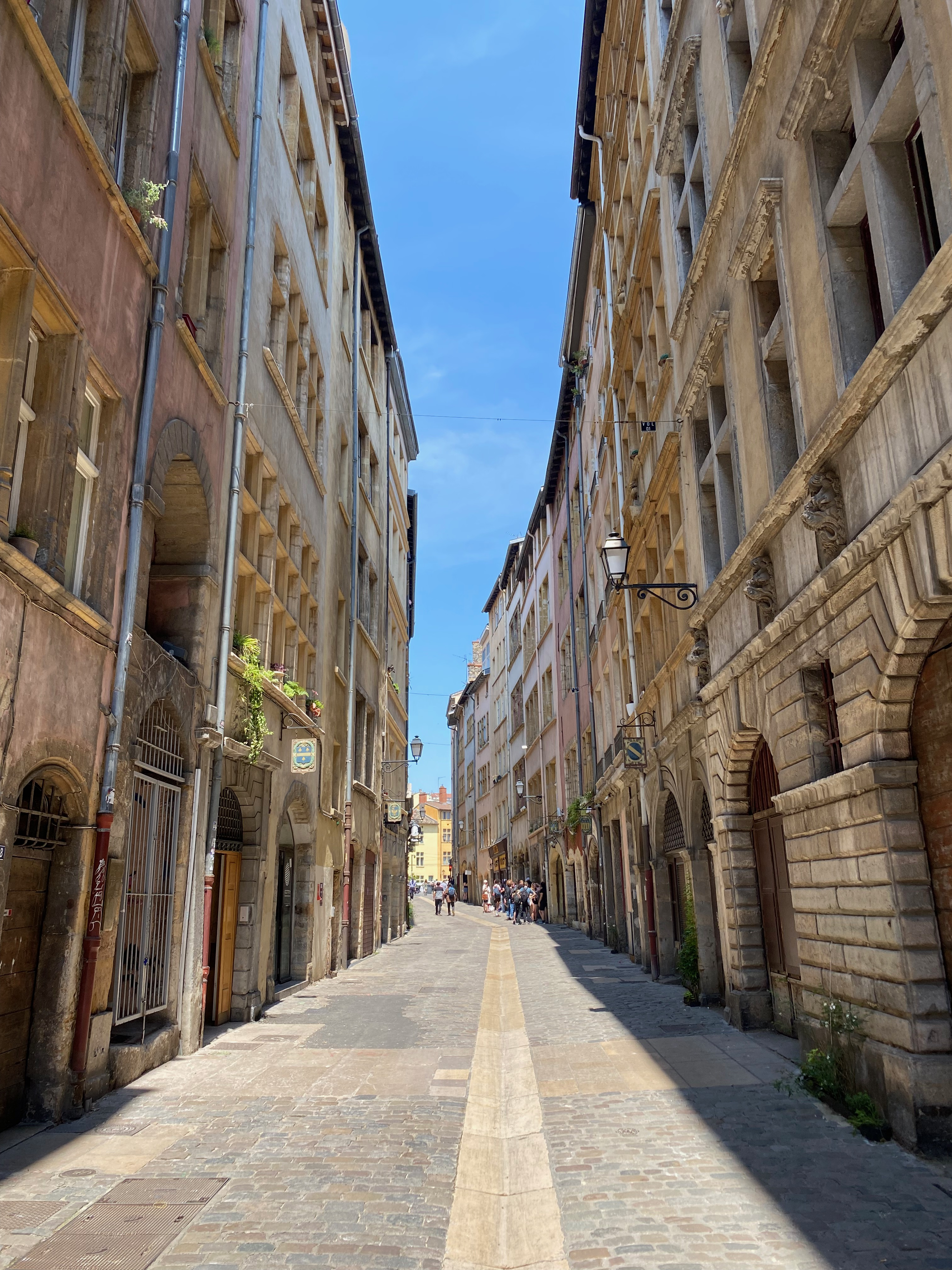
Rue Juiverie

== Saint-Paul ==
Saint-Paul is the quarter surrounding Gare Saint-Paul, built in 1873, and the church of the same name. It is the scholastic pole of Vieux Lyon, with two main institutes, les Maristes et les Lazaristes. The church of Saint Paul itself was built for the first time in 549 and rebuilt in the 11th and 12th centuries.

== See also ==
- History of Lyon
