= Bibliography of the history of Lyon =

This is a bibliography of the history of Lyon. The history of Lyon has been deeply studied by many historians who published hundreds of books on architecture, arts, religion, etc., in Lyon throughout centuries.

All the books listed here are in French-language.

== General works ==
in French

- Visages du Lyonnais, ouvrage collectif - Ed des Horizons de France - 1952
- André Latreille (dir.), Histoire de Lyon et du Lyonnais, Privat, 1975, 1984, Paris, with Richard Gascon & al. (ISBN 2-70894-701-X)
- Jean Pelletier, Charles Delfante, Atlas historique du grand Lyon : formes urbaines et paysages au fil du temps, Seyssinet-Pariset, 2004, Lyon, 221p. (ISBN 2-907608-40-1)
- André Pelletier, Jacques Rossiaud, Françoise Bayard et Pierre Cayez, Histoire de Lyon : des origines à nos jours, Éditions Lyonnaises d'Art et d'Histoire, 2007, Lyon, 955p. (ISBN 978-2-84147-190-4)
- André Pelletier, Histoire de Lyon; De la capitale des Gaules à la métropole européenne; De -10 000 à + 2007., Éditions lyonnaises d'Arts et d'Histoire, 2007, Lyon, 143p. (ISBN 978-2-84147-188-1)
- Jean-Pierre Gutton, Histoire de Lyon illustrée, Le Pérégrinateur Éditeur, 2008, Toulouse (ISBN 2-910352-48 X)
- Patrice Béghain, Bruno Benoit, Gérard Corneloup, Bruno Thévenan, Dictionnaire historique de Lyon, Stéphane Bachès, 2009, Lyon, 1054p. (ISBN 978-2-915266-65-8)

in English

- Abraham Rees (1819), "Lyons", The Cyclopaedia, London: Longman, Hurst, Rees, Orme & Brown
- "Lyons", A Handbook for Travellers in France, London: John Murray, 1861
- Frederick Martin (1867), "The Four Great Cities of France: Lyons", Commercial Handbook of France, London: Longmans, Green, OCLC 4471325
- "Lyons", Appleton's European Guide Book (23rd ed.), New York: D. Appleton & Co., 1886
- "Lyons". South-Eastern France (3rd ed.). Leipsic: Karl Baedeker. 1898.
- "Lyons" . Encyclopædia Britannica. Vol. 17 (11th ed.). 1911. pp. 174–176.

== Bibliographies ==
- J.B. Monfalcon (1851). Bibliographie de la ville de Lyon (in French). L. Perrin. (+ contents)
- Monfalcon, Jean-Baptiste (1860), "Bibliographie Lyonnaise", Catalogue des bibliotheques du palais des arts (in French)
- Sébastien Charléty [in French] (1903). Bibliographie critique de l'histoire de Lyon, depuis 1789 jusqu'à nos jours. Annales de l'universite de Lyon (in French).

== Works by period ==
=== Ancient history ===
- André Pelletier, André Blanc, Pierre Broise, Jean Prieur, Histoire et archéologie de la France; Rhône-Alpes; De l'âge du fer au Haut Moyen Âge, Horvath, 1988, Le Coteau, 261p. (ISBN 2-11-080891-8)
- André Pelletier, Lugdunum : Lyon, Editions lyonnaises d'art et d'histoire, 1999, Lyon, 151p. (ISBN 2-7297-0627-5)
- Jean-François Reynaud, Lyon - Rhône, aux premiers temps chrétiens, basiliques et nécropoles, La Documentation française, 1986, Paris, 143p. (ISBN 2-11-080891-8)
- Matthieu Poux, Hugues Savay-Guerraz (dir.), Lyon avant Lugdunum, Gollion, (published by the Pôle archéologique du département du Rhône), 2003, 151p. (ISBN 2-88474-106-2)
- Jean Burdy, André Pelletier, Guide du Lyon gallo-romain, Éditions lyonnaises d'art et d'histoire, 2004, Lyon, 128p. (ISBN 2-8414-7148-9)
- Armand Desbat (dir.), Lugdunum, naissance d'une capitale, Gollion (published by the Pôle archéologique du département du Rhône), 2005, 181p. (ISBN 2-88474-120-8)
- Éric Rieth (dir.), Les épaves de Saint-Georges, Lyon, Ier-XVIIIe siècles. Analyse architecturale et études complémentaires; CNRS, 2010, 247p. (ISBN 978-2-271-06926-9)

=== Medieval history ===
- Armorial des prévôts de marchands et échevins de la ville de Lyon de 1596 à 1789, Rivoire Libraire, 1844, Lyon
- Pierre Bonnassieux, De la réunion de Lyon à la France; Étude historique d'après les documents originaux, 1875, Lyon, Paris, 237p.
- René Poupardin, Le royaume de Provence sous les carolingiens (855-933?), Émile Bouillon édition, 1901, Paris, 470p.
- René Poupardin, Le royaume de Bourgogne (888-1038); Étude sur les origines du royaume d'Arles, Honoré Champion ed., 1907, Paris, 509p.
- Alfred Coville, Recherches sur l'Histoire de Lyon; du Vème siècle au IXème siècle (450-800), Éditions Auguste Picard, 1928, Paris, 560p.
- Pierre Wuilleumier, Amable Audin, André Leroi-Gourhan, L'église et la nécropole Saint-Laurent dans le quartier lyonnais de Choulans; Étude archéologique et étude anthropologique, Audin, 1949, Lyon, 113p.
- Etienne Fournial, La souveraineté du Lyonnais au Xème siècle, dans Le Moyen âge, n°4, 1956
- René Fédou, Les hommes de loi lyonnais à la fin du Moyen âge; étude sur les origines de la classe de robe, Annales de l'Université de Lyon, 1964, Lyon
- Guy de Valous, Le Patriciat lyonnais aux XIIIe et XIVe siècles, A. et J. Picard, 1973, Paris, 490p.
- Nicole Gonthier, Lyon et ses pauvres au Moyen âge; 1350-1500, Éditions l'Hermès, 1978, Lyon (ISBN 2-85934-057-2)
- Brigitte Beaujard, Topographie chrétienne des cités de la Gaule. Tome 4 : Province ecclésiastique de Lyon; des origines au milieu du VIIIe siècle , De Boccard, 1985, Paris, 80p. (ISBN 978-2-7018-0030-1)
- Lucien Musset, Stéphane Lebecq, Les invasions; les vagues germaniques, PUF, 1994, Paris, Coll. Nouvelle Clio n°12, 323p., (ISBN 2130467156)
- B. Gauthiez, La topographie de Lyon au Moyen Âge, dans Archéologie du midi médiéval, 12, 1994, pp. 3–38
- J. Favrod, Histoire politique du royaume burgonde (443-534), Bibliothèque historique vaudoise, 1997, Lausanne, 544 p.
- Jean-François Reynaud, Lugdunum christianum; Lyon du IVe au VIIIe s. : topographie, nécropoles et édifices religieux, Éd. de la Maison des sciences de l'homme, 1998, Paris, 285p. (ISBN 2-7351-0636-5)
- Charles Bonnet, Jean-François Reynaud, Genève et Lyon, capitales burgondes, in Memorias de la Real Academia de Buenas Letras de Barcelona, vol. 25 , 2000, Barcelone, pp. 241–66 (ISSN 0213-9499)
- Jean-François Reynaud, L'antiquité tardive et le haut Moyen Âge, in Jean Pelletier, Charles Delfante, Atlas historique du grand Lyon, Lejeune (Xavier), 2005, Lyon, pp. 40–52 (ISBN 2-907608-40-1)
- Nicolas Reveyron, Chantiers lyonnais du Moyen Âge, Association de liaison pour le patrimoine et l'archéologie en Rhône-Alpes et en Auvergne, 2005, Lyon, 380 p. (ISBN 2-9516145-9-4)
- Jean-François Reynard (dir.), François Richard, L'abbaye d'Ainay, des origines au XIIème siècle, PUL, 2008, Lyon, 302 p. (ISBN 978-2-7297-0806-1)

=== Modern history ===
- Marc Brésard, Les foires de Lyon aux XVème et XVIème siècles, Auguste Picard, 1914, Paris, 386p.
- Gascon Richard, « Grand commerce et vie urbaine au XVIème siècle; Lyon et ses marchands », École pratique des hautes études, 1971, Paris, 2 tomes
- Colloque sur l'humanisme lyonnais au XVIe siècle; Mai 1972;Lyon, Presses universitaires de Grenoble, 1974, Grenoble, 394p. (ISBN 2-7061-0033-8)
- Ardouin Paul, « Maurice Scève, Pernette du Guillet, Louise Labé : L'amour à Lyon au temps de la Renaissance », Nizet, 1981, Paris, 395 p.
- Jacqueline Boucher, Présence italienne à Lyon à la Renaissance : du milieu du XVe à la fin du XVIe siècle, Lugd, 1994, Lyon, 175p., (ISBN 2-84147-006-7)
- Françoise Bayard, Vivre à Lyon sous l'Ancien Régime, Perrin, 1997, Paris, 360p. (ISBN 978-2-262-01078-2)
- Giuseppe Iacono, Salvatore Ennio Furone, Les marchands banquiers florentins et l'architecture à Lyon au XVIe siècle, Éd. Publisud, 1999, Paris, 285p. (ISBN 2-86600-683-6)
- Jacqueline Boucher, Vivre à Lyon au XVIe siècle, Éditions lyonnaises d'Arts et d'Histoire, 2001, Lyon, 159 p. (ISBN 2-84147-113-6)
- Édouard Lejeune, La saga lyonnaise des Gadagne, 2004, ELAH, Lyon, 173p. (ISBN 2-84147-153-5)
- Caroline Fargeix, Les élites lyonnaises du XVe siècle au miroir de leur langage : pratiques et représentations culturelles des conseillers de Lyon, d'après les registres de délibérations consulaires, de Boccard, 2007, Paris, 657p. (ISBN 978-2-7018-0232-9)
- Clément Michèle & Incardona Janine, « L'émergence littéraire des femmes à Lyon à la Renaissance; 1520–1560 », PU Saint-Étienne, 2008, Saint-Étienne (ISBN 978-2-86272-472-0)
- Michel Francou, Armorial des florentins à Lyon à la Renaissance, Ed. du Cosmogone, 2009, Lyon, 59p. (ISBN 978-2-8103-0020-4)
- Yves Krumenacker (dir.), Lyon 1552, capitale protestante; une histoire religieuse de Lyon à la Renaissance, Éditions Olivétan, 2009, Lyon, 335p. (ISBN 978-2-35479-094-3)

Revolutionary period

- Bruno Benoit, Roland Saussac, Guide historique de la Révolution à Lyon; 1789-1799, Éditions de Trévoux, 1988, Lyon, 190p. (ISBN 2-85698-043-0)
- Louis Trenard, La Révolution française dans la région Rhône-Alpes, Perrin, 1992, Paris, 819p. (ISBN 2-262-00826-4)
- Paul Chopelin, Ville patriote et ville martyre. Lyon, l'Église et la Révolution, 1788-1805, Letouzey & Ané, 2010, Paris, 463p. (ISBN 978-2-7063-0270-1)

=== Contemporary history ===
- Gauthiez, Bernard, Lyon, entre Bellecour et Terreaux; urbanisme et architecture au XIXe siècle, Éd. lyonnaises d'art et d'histoire, 1999, Lyon, 132p. (ISBN 2-84147-067-9)

== Works by topic ==
=== Religious history ===
in French

- J. Beyssac, Les chanoines de l'Église de Lyon, P. Grange & Cie; reissued by the René Georges editions, 1914; 2000 reissue, Lyon, 332p.
- Jacques Gadille, René Fédou, Henri Hours, Bernard de Vrégille, s.j., Le Diocèse de Lyon; Histoire des diocèses de France - 16, Beauchesne, 1983, Paris, 350p. (ISBN 2-7010-1066-7)
- Michel Francou, Armorial historique des archevêques de Lyon, René Georges, 2002, Lyon, 177p. (ISBN 2-909929-11-6)
- Simone Wyss, Le cloitre de Saint-Just à travers les âges, Association culturelle des sanctuaires de Saint-Irénée et Saint-Just, 2002, Lyon, 114p. (ISSN 1266-8303)
- Michel Rubellin, Église et société chrétienne d'Agobard à Valdès, PUL, 2003, Lyon, 550p. (ISBN 2-7297-0712-3)
- Bernard Berthod, Jean Comby, Histoire de l'Église de Lyon, La Taillanderie, 2007, Lyon, 234p. (ISBN 978-2-87629-312-0)
- Jean-François Reynaud, François Richard, dir., L'abbaye d'Ainay, des origines au XIIème siècle, PUL, 2008, Lyon, 296p. (ISBN 978-2-7297-0806-1)

in English

- Alfred Lévy (1907), "Lyons", Jewish Encyclopedia, vol. 8, New York
- Georges Goyau (1910). "Archdiocese of Lyons". Catholic Encyclopedia. New York.

=== Histoire of architecture and arts ===
Architecture, sculpture, monuments

- Burnouf J., Guilhot J.-O., Mandy M.-O., Orcel C., « Le Pont de la Guillotière; Franchir le Rhône à Lyon; DARA n°5, série lyonnaise n°3 », Circonscription des antiquités historiques, 1991, Lyon, 196 p. (ISBN 2 906190 09 8)
- Jean Pelletier, Ponts et quais de Lyon, Éditions lyonnaises d'Arts et d'Histoire, 2002, Lyon, 128 p. (ISBN 2-84147-115-2)
- Jean Burdy, Les aqueducs romains de Lyon, PUL, 2002, Lyon, 204p. (ISBN 2-7297-0683-6)
- François Dallemagne, Les défenses de Lyon. Enceintes et fortifications, Éditions lyonnaises d'Arts et d'Histoire, 2010, 2nd issue, Lyon, 255 p. (ISBN 2-84147-177-2)

Painting

- Madeleine Vicent, La peinture lyonnaise du XVIe au XXe siècle, A. Guillot, 1980, Lyon, 139p.
- Élisabeth Hardouin-Fugier, La peinture lyonnaise au XIXe siècle, Édition de l'Amateur, 1995, Lyon, 311p. (ISBN 2-85917-193-2)

== See also ==
- History of Lyon
- Timeline of Lyon § Bibliography
