= Gallic Wall of Lyon =

Murus gallicus

- Murus gallicus de Lyon
- The segment of the murus gallicus in blue, downstream from the Roman rampart (in red), under the university residence at 1 Place Abbé-Larue.

- Location within Metropole de Lyon
- 45°45′20.63″N 4°49′11.5″E

The Gallic Wall of Lyon is a Gaulish wall discovered on the southwest plateau of Fourvière (Lyon) during preventive excavations conducted in 2014 at Abbé-Larue Square. Its construction is estimated to date back to the first half of the 1st century BCE.

A diagnostic conducted in 2012 revealed several elements of the fortifications that marked the local history: a Roman rampart, the Retraite enclosure (14th century), and the Fourvière enclosure (19th century). The 2014 excavation confirmed previous discoveries and revealed a Gallic wall, the presence of which was completely unsuspected.

This wall is a major discovery in Lyon's history as it proves the presence of Gauls at the time of the foundation of Lugdunum. The adjacent Roman wall is also very interesting: it is the first section uncovered of the Augustan ramparts.

== History ==
=== Early discoveries ===
In 1968, archaeologist Amable Audin made the initial observations on this site during the construction of a retirement home: numerous wells were drilled to pour concrete posts for the building's foundations. Audin spotted a large wall at the bottom of these wells, which he dated to the period of the Roman Empire. He associated this structure with the ancient Lyon enclosure and reported the presence of numerous painted coatings.

The Archaeological Service of the City of Lyon conducted preventive archaeology digs in 2012, followed by excavations in 2014, at 1 Place Abbé-Larue on the site of a future university residence. This operation, covering an area of approximately 1,200 square meters and a depth of up to 7 meters, revealed remains belonging to four different periods: a Gallic wall part of a Gaulish fortification, a Roman rampart with a tower, a rampart and structures dating from the early Middle Ages (possibly a base of the old Saint-Just gate), and the masonry of bastion number 2 of the Fourvière enclosure.

The 64 concrete posts made for the retirement home foundations in 1968 pierced and damaged the remains in many places. The 2012 diagnostic allowed for a more thorough examination and uncovered several walls, a sewer, a funerary urn, and fragments of objects. The 2014 excavation led to the discovery of a Gallic wall predating the Roman wall. The site was later covered by a university residence with two levels of underground parking.

=== Context of the discovery of the Gallic Wall ===
Until 2014, the oldest known traces of occupation on the Fourvière plateau dated back to the Iron Age but were limited to a network of ditches that could correspond to the enclosure of a sanctuary. Amable Audin attributed what he identified as ancient masonry to the Lugdunum enclosure: historians later doubted its existence, but future excavations hoped to confirm it. Between the 1980s and 2000s, the study of artifacts collected in the ditches of another site on the Fourvière hill, the Clos du Verbe Incarné, showed that the earliest traces of occupation date back to the 2nd century BCE.

The discovery of a segment of fortification like the Gallic Wall with horizontal timbering and a rear ramp definitively confirms Lyon's occupation before its "foundation" by Lucius Munatius Plancus. Indeed, this rampart with a water plan at the rear suggests the existence of an oppidum, a city of Celtic tradition that existed prior to Roman conquest. Thus, this excavation is doubly exceptional: the Augustan rampart is confirmed, and the Gaulish defensive wall is as new as it is unexpected.

== Description ==
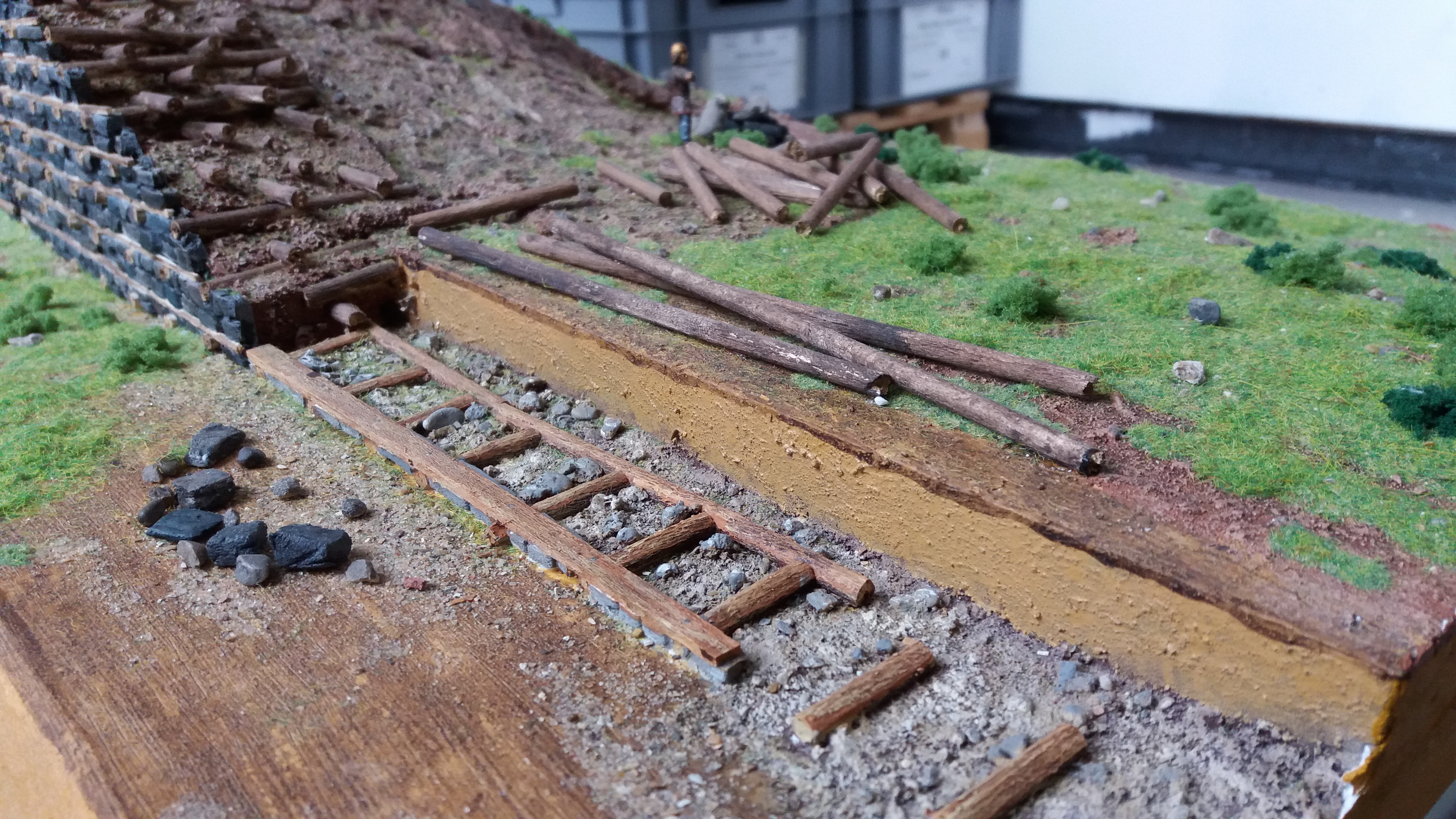
Reconstruction of the murus gallicus, model by Nicolas Hirsch (Archaeological Service of the City of Lyon).

The Gallic wall was observed over a length of 30.54 meters. Oriented at 52.3° west, it is almost parallel to the Roman rampart and has a slight slope estimated at 6.6%. It consists of a facing wall made of dry stones supported by an artificial earth embankment that must have measured 4 to 5 meters. Its structure corresponds to the walls of fortified Gaulish sites in Western Europe, and it is part of the family of protohistoric ramparts with horizontal beams and rear rampart of the late Iron Age.

In comparison to three typologies of Gallic Wall, the Lyon wall belongs to the latest period, characterized by an internal longitudinal beam made of a beam 5 to 10 centimeters thick, with a facade showing a vertical alternation of wood and facing stones. This technique is found at Vertault (second half of the 1st century BC) and in the walls of Alesia (1st century BC).

Since the furniture does not allow the exact dating of the wall, it is possible that it was used until the beginning of the principate of Augustus, as the colony of Plancus did not have monumental fortifications.

== 2012 diagnostic ==
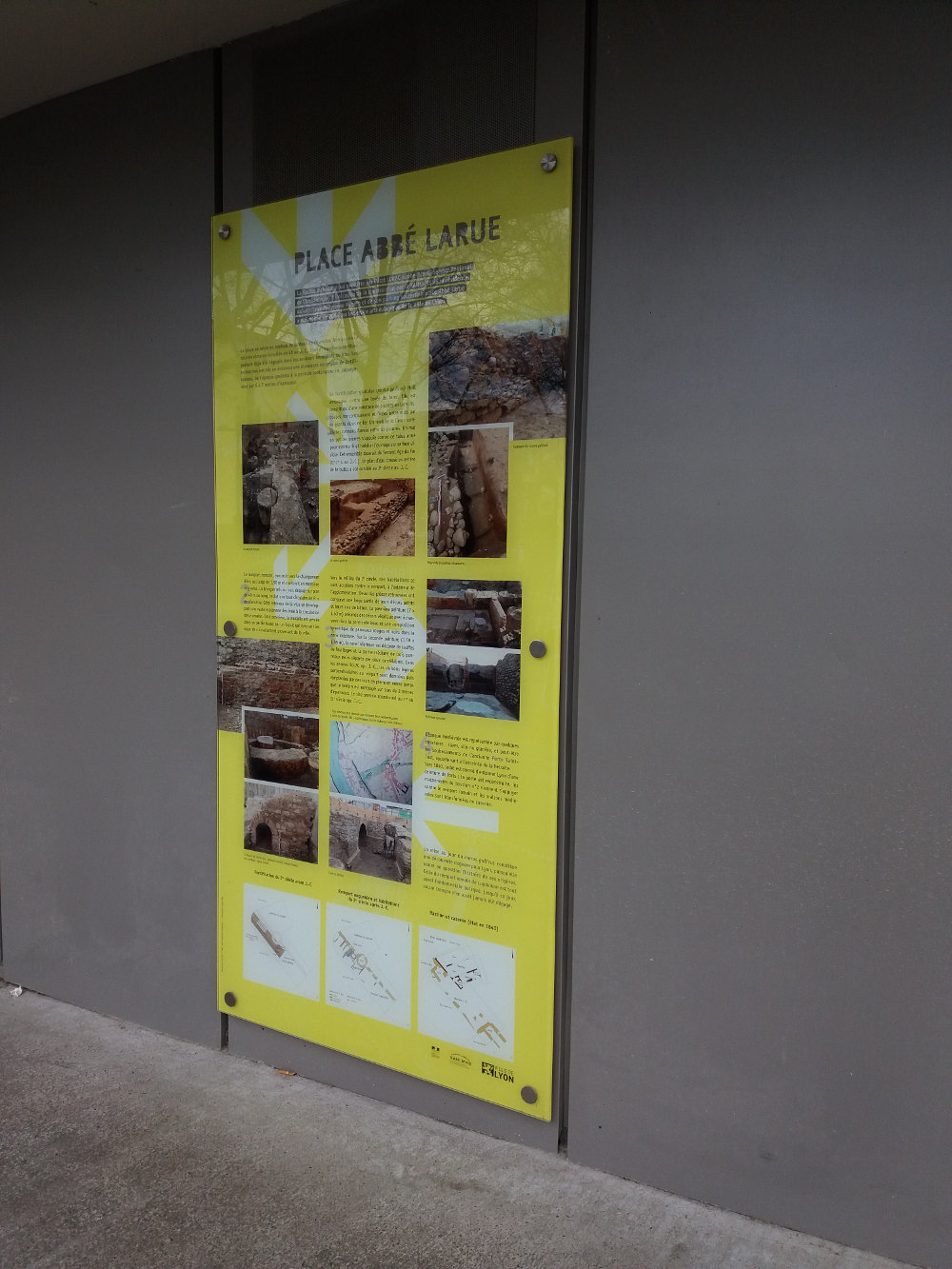
Panel presenting the synthesis of the excavations on the wall of the university residence.

Before the construction of a university residence, a prescription order for preventive archaeology diagnosis was issued on January 3, 2012. Archaeologist Michèle Monin was appointed responsible for the intervention, and the action was carried out on the ground by the Archaeological Service of the City of Lyon, between May 22 and June 26, 2012, for a total of 48-man-days. In addition to this, there were 3-man-days of preparation, 93-man-days of work, and 94-man-days of study. Three permanent archaeologists and one volunteer archaeologist participated in the operations.

During this initial phase, three armored probes were conducted: two open armored probes to an average depth of 5.60 meters, and one surface observation.

=== Context ===
The site is located 400 meters from the ancient theater and the odeon. Several important ancient discoveries had been made previously around the site: remains of habitation, a metallurgy workshop, and a thermal complex on Rue des Tourelles (1974), a thermal establishment and housing blocks on Rue des Farges (between 1974 and 1980), and at 8 Place Abbé-Larue a Gallo-Roman house with an atrium (2000).

The site, which was located in the center of the Roman city, was occupied between the end of the 1st century BC and the beginning of the 3rd century. It was abandoned after a violent fire and then used as a burial area until the early Middle Ages.

In 1362, Charles V the Wise ordered the construction of a wall to defend the city against the English and the Tard-Venus; it was completed in 1378. One of its entrances, the Saint-Just gate, was located around the Place Abbé-Larue, and probably one of the defensive towers.

This wall was rebuilt between 1834 and 1838, and one of its bastions was found on the excavated plot. It was destroyed around 1945.

=== Furniture ===
The inventory of the excavations reports 3,279 shards, of which 2,620 are of ancient origin, with the others belonging to the modern and contemporary periods.

The most significant furniture is made of iron, consisting of 59 fragments weighing 2,270.4 grams. Only one fragment of glass paste was found, belonging to a perfume agitator. The fragments of painted plaster are only debris: they come from houses and different periods.

=== Roman rampart ===
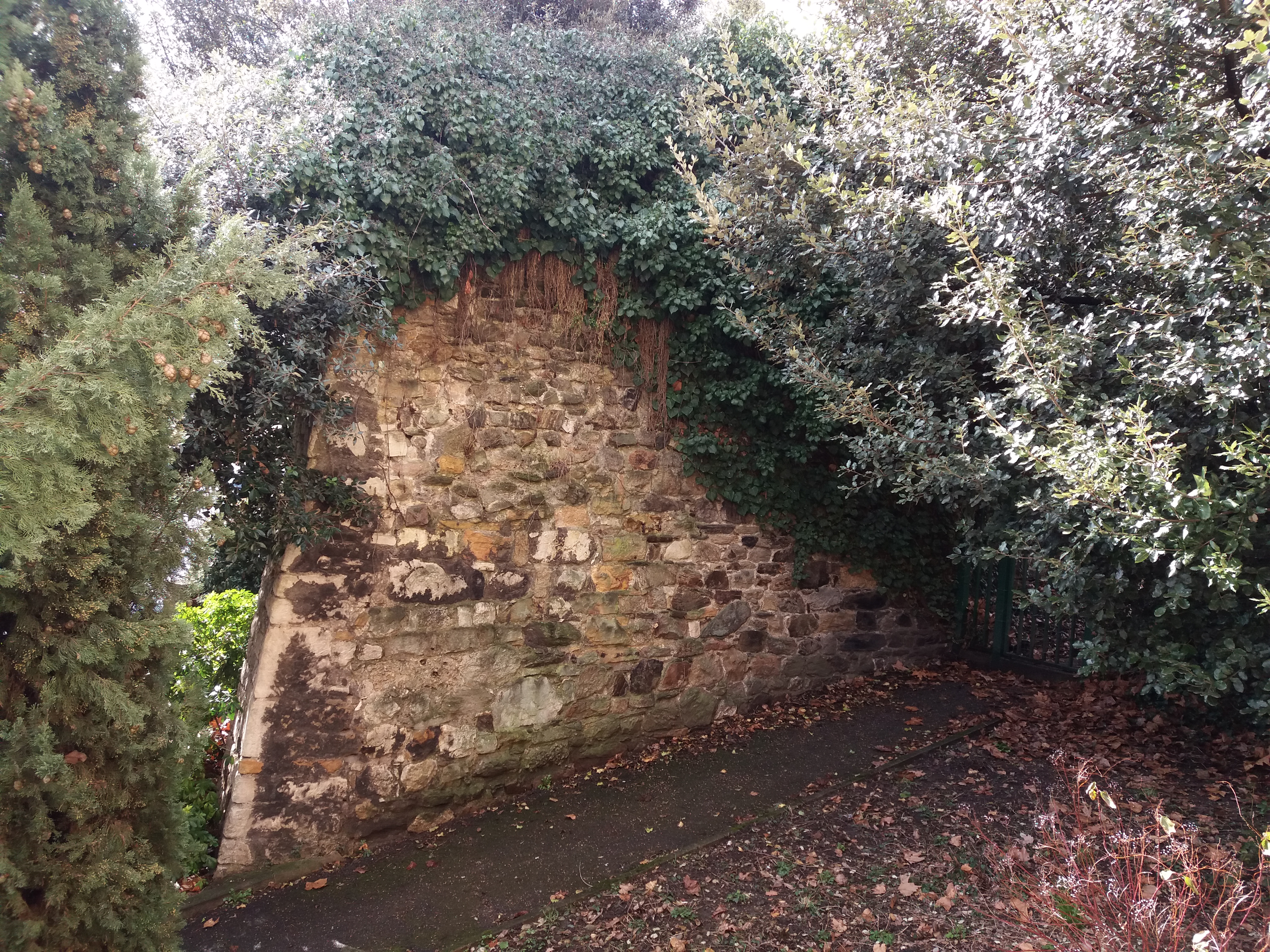
Remains of the medieval rampart, Montée du Télégraphe, crossing Place Abbé-Larue.

The wall observed in 1968 by Amable Audin was partially dismantled during the 2012 survey, which was necessary to install the metal structures of the new construction. It was 1.80 meters wide and initially 4 meters high (the foundations could not be probed), composed of granite blocks bonded with whitish mortar. A vaulted sewer made of bricks passes through it from end to end. Three ceramic fragments found in the deposits of this sewer are dated to the Augustan period.

This wall, built in the Early Roman Empire, was only used for about fifty years. Erected during the Pax Romana, its role was more symbolic than utilitarian: constructions were built against it and outside it in the second half of the first century.

The medieval wall, called the "Retreat Enclosure," built in 1362 after the Battle of Brignais, was completely destroyed on the site when the foundations of the retirement home were laid in 1968.

=== Funerary space ===
A funerary urn is discovered at the foot of the wall. It is described as "a cylindrical cooking pot with ribbed neck, in dark gray common ceramic, equipped with a single handle." The dating of its contents, burnt bones, and sediments, indicates a period between 30 and 50 AD. The funerary space is confirmed by the upper layers containing charcoal and burnt bones.

This urn is similar to the production of the Sarra workshop discovered in 1969 on the hill of Fourvière. About 21 centimeters high, it contained human bones without charcoal residues, probably washed after cremation. The analyses suggest that "the human remains belong to a minimum individual, of unknown sex, [...] of adult size, deceased at the earliest as a young adult". The total mass of the bones is 400.2 grams, which corresponds to the average observed in Lyon balsam jars.

=== Backfill ===
The subsequent layers testify to the abandonment of the site and its use as a dumping ground. They contain numerous archaeological fragments from bones, oyster shells, building elements, dishes, metal, or ceramics, dating to a period between 70 BC and the 1st century AD. Copper alloys suggest the presence of a nearby metallurgical workshop. The last layer of soil contains furniture dated around the 3rd and 4th centuries.

== Excavation of 2014 ==
A preventive archaeological excavation on the entire construction plot was carried out from the beginning of 2014 until July 31st. The area covered extends over 1,055 m2, and the depth ranges from 6 to 7 meters between 247.10 and 254 meters NGF. The studied part is limited to the excavation levels of the future building's parking lots, so elements of the wall located lower could not be probed.

Many elements of the Gallic Wall could be identified: a trench dug into the loess 1.10 meters high in front of the rampart (south side), a horizontal timbering whose imprints of beams and 48 iron nails were found, five levels of superimposed crossed beams, a blocking of large pebbles holding the structure, and a facing composed of dry stone gneiss and small rough limestone blocks.

To the north of the wall was a water basin whose furniture was dated to the end of the 1st century, but it is not possible to say if it was part of the defensive structure: it may have been filled later. The presence of this wall implies that of an oppidum, but no other discovery currently allows its location to be determined.

=== Context ===
The oldest human traces discovered on the site date back to the end of prehistory and were found about 7 meters deep, over a thickness of 70 cm. Some ceramic fragments were found, probably belonging to the Late Neolithic (Bell Beaker culture) and Early Bronze Age. A very small number of shards belong to the Late Bronze Age or the early Iron Age. These rare traces confirm that the population inhabited the plain of Vaise at that time and not the plateau of Fourvière.

=== Roman rampart ===
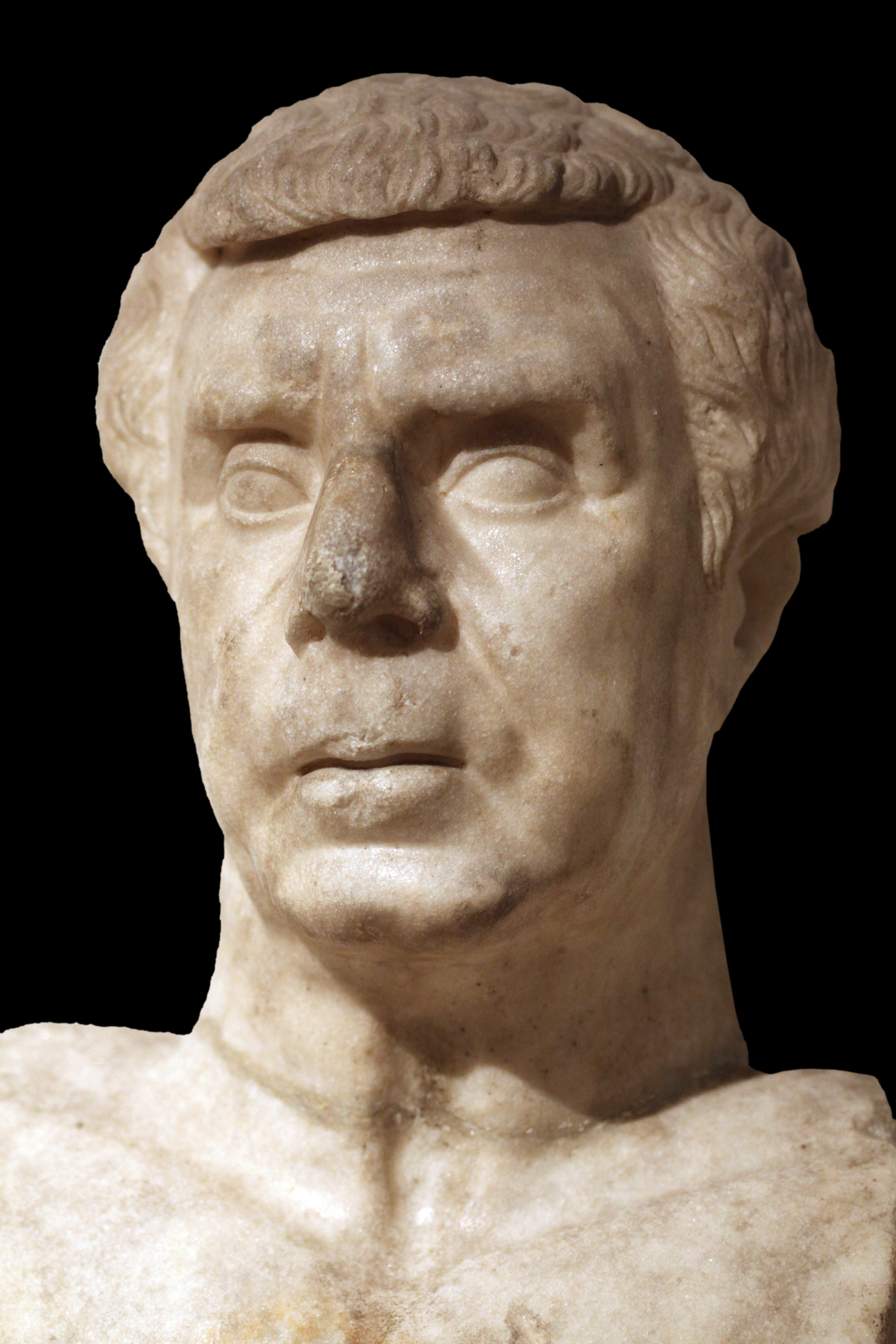
Presumed bust of Plancus (Lugdunum Museum).

Before the construction of the Augustan wall, the wall collapsed. Different levels were found, notably inside the Roman tower, forming a slope in which elements of Italic-influenced ceramics were collected and dated to around 20 to 15 BC (about 25 to 30 years after the foundation of Lugdunum by Lucius Munatius Plancus). Similar Roman occupation of Celtic fortifications was observed at the La Chaussée-Tirancourt site, located between 40 and 25 BC.

=== Site and water basin ===
Paleoenvironmental analyses conducted on samples provide numerous insights into the state of the site at the time of the wall. An artificial water basin formed after the fortification was built; furniture found in its early infill levels dates between 30 and 15 BC. A strong human presence is evident at this time, proven by forest species used as fuel (from surrounding forests), as well as indications of cereal cultivation and food waste such as remains of local fruits (fig, mulberry, grape, and elderberry) and imported olives. Finally, numerous eggs were identified, and paleoparasitological analyses show the presence of livestock.

== Conclusion of archaeological operations ==
The excavations at the Abbé-Larue site have uncovered a new chapter in the history of Lyon by providing material evidence of the presence of an oppidum on the Fourvière plateau, a place previously thought to be uninhabited before the foundation of Lugdunum in 43 BC. Although the limited scope of these excavations does not allow for determining the extent of the population at this location or why they retreated to this hill, it confirms the only text that referred to Lugdnunum's Celtic past (De Fluviis, 2nd century AD).

The results of the preventive archaeological excavation have "exceeded all expectations." Despite the numerous modifications to the site over the centuries, the interdisciplinary study of the remains has unearthed new insights into Lyon's past and leaves unanswered questions about the true role of General Plancus.

== A Lyon oppidum? ==
In 1965, Amable Audin hypothesized the presence of an oppidum in Lyon, but no evidence allowed him to corroborate his intuition. From the early 1980s, excavations uncovered much material at various points in Fourvière, demonstrating significant use of the hill, yet finding no evidence of permanent habitation structures. The most significant of these is the site of the former religious enclosure of the Incarnate Word, where the content of a ditch composed 95% of animal bones and amphorae is dated between the late 2nd century and the early 1st century BC. Fourvière differs from contemporary Gaulish sites in the region, such as Bibracte, Corent, Gondole, or Vesontio, by its absence of domestic markers related to habitat: there is almost no trace of adornments, coins, or instrumentum.

In 2006, several discoveries attest to the presence of a settlement at the end of the Iron Age in the Vaise district but do not determine whether there was one or several oppida: four tumulus tombs with wooden burial chambers (2nd century BC) and ditches filled with amphorae and reshaped tokens. However, dwellings at this time are often built at height, as with the Arverni, Edui, Sequani, or Ségusiaves. An eventual oppidum would therefore be sought in the areas of La Duchère, La Croix-Rousse, or Fourvière.

In this context, the discovery of the Gallic Wall in 2014 is "spectacular". The entirety of the hill's excavations shows that Fourvière was an "important hub of socio-economic activities of the Eastern Ségusiaves at the end of the Iron Age." Its progressive evolution into a gathering and worship site, then into a Gallic settlement before the foundation of the Colonia Copia Felix Munatia, "leaves no doubt".

== See also ==
- Ceintures de Lyon

== Bibliography ==
- Clément, Benjamin; Desbat, Armand; Sartre, Capucine; Savay-Guerraz, Hugues (2019). Atlas topographique de Lugdunum (in French). Revue archéologique de l'Est. ISBN 978-2-915544-41-1.
- Desbat, Armand; Poux, Matthieu (2018). Lugdunum et ses campagnes. Actualité de la recherche (in French). Mergoil. ISBN 978-2-35518-064-4.
- Monin, Michèle; Dessaint, Philippe (2018). Protéger Lyon : vingt siècles de fortifications (in French). Archéologia. ISSN 0570-6270.
- Monin, Michèle; Dessaint, Philippe (2015). 1 place Abbé Larue 69005 Lyon (in French). Service archéologique de la ville de Lyon.
- Monin, Michèle; André, Aurélie; Carrara, Stéphane; Dessaint, Philippe (2012). place Abbé Larue Lyon 5e (in French). Service archéologique de la Ville de Lyon.
- Monin, Michèle (2016). L'oppidum de Lyon (in French). L'Archéologue. ISSN 1255-5932.
- Monin, Michèle (2015). Le murus gallicus de Lyon (Rhône) (PDF) (in French). Bulletin de l'Association Française pour l'Étude de l'Âge du Fer. pp. 67–71.
- Bilan scientifique de la région Rhône-Alpes : 2014 (in French). Ministère de la Culture et de la Communication. 2015.
