= Cognet de Seynes =

French automobile

- Founded: 1912/1913 (first automobile)
- Defunct: 1926
- Headquarters: Route de Heyrieux, Lyon, France
- Key people: Victor Cognet; Edouard de Seynes (1881–1957)
- Products: Automobiles

The Cognet de Seynes (1912–1919) or C de S (1919–1926) was a French automobile manufactured in Lyon from 1912 or 1913 until 1926. The company was formed by financial backer Edouard de Seynes (1881–1957) and engineer Victor Cognet.

== Founders ==
Edouard de Seynes was just 25 when he first met Viktor Cognet in 1907. De Seynes was born in Avignon but had recently moved to Lyon following his marriage. He still had the impetuosity of youth, and he was passionately interested in things mechanical: also he was rich. He was impressed by the engineering talent of his new friend and soon suggested a business partnership.

Viktor Cognet was a little older, and already had a small factory alongside the Heyrieux road, on the south-eastern side of Lyon. Here he manufactured "silent gear-boxes" to a design over which he had registered a patent. The two of them went into business as sub-contractors for a range of industrial companies in the region, but the idea of becoming automobile manufacturers with their own names on the vehicles was envisaged from early on, and their first car was presented in 1913. Cognet de Seynes automobiles continued to be produced until 1916. During the war the company also made aero engine parts for Anzani.

Peace broke out at the end of 1918. The manufacturer retained its head office and factory beside the Heyrieux road, but changed its name to C de S. In 1920 control passed to a man named Ducerf who came from Saint-Étienne and had plans to build a range of cars, using the pre-war design with only minor updating. He planned to make 300 cars a year but this did not happen. Edouard de Seynes took back control and the factory settled down to a production rate of 20 to 30 cars a year. The last cars were made in 1926 when the company closed, being unable to compete with mass manufacturers.

== Automobile ==
The first, and as it turned out only model was of a simple design and first appeared in 1912 or 1913 (sources differ) and had a 1124 cc four-cylinder engine with a 3-speed gearbox described as "recilinear and without cardan joints". It sat on a 2,610 mm (102.8 in) wheelbase. With three- or four-seat tourer body the car was said to be able to reach 55 km/h (34 mph).

The car reappeared as the "C de S 5 HP" at the 15th Paris Motor Show in October 1919. The 3 or 4 seater "Torpedo" bodied tourers were still offered, along with a "Conduite interieure" (two-box sedan/saloon/berline) version. Also listed was a "Camionette (500 Kilos)" light van version. Two cars are believed to have survived.

== See also ==
- History of Lyon
