= History of Lyon =

French municipal history

Lyon Coat of Arms

Lyon is a city in the southeast of France. The area has been inhabited since prehistoric times and was an important city in the Roman Empire, Lugdunum. After the Battle of Lugdunum (197) the ancient city never fully recovered. The medieval and modern city of Lyon took its place.

== Prehistory ==
Archaeological evidence suggests that until Roman times human activity in the area of modern Lyon was largely limited to trade, feasting and other significant, but transient, gatherings of local peoples. Already by the Stone Age there may have already been long-distance trade routes passing through the area, following the course of the Rhône and the Saône Rivers, from the Mediterranean to Northern Europe. By the Iron Age, an emporium was present, and at Fourvière people met and feasted, leaving behind thousands of amphora and animal bones. The Gallic tribes who were present likely included the Segusiavi, Aedui, and Allobroges.

== Antiquity ==
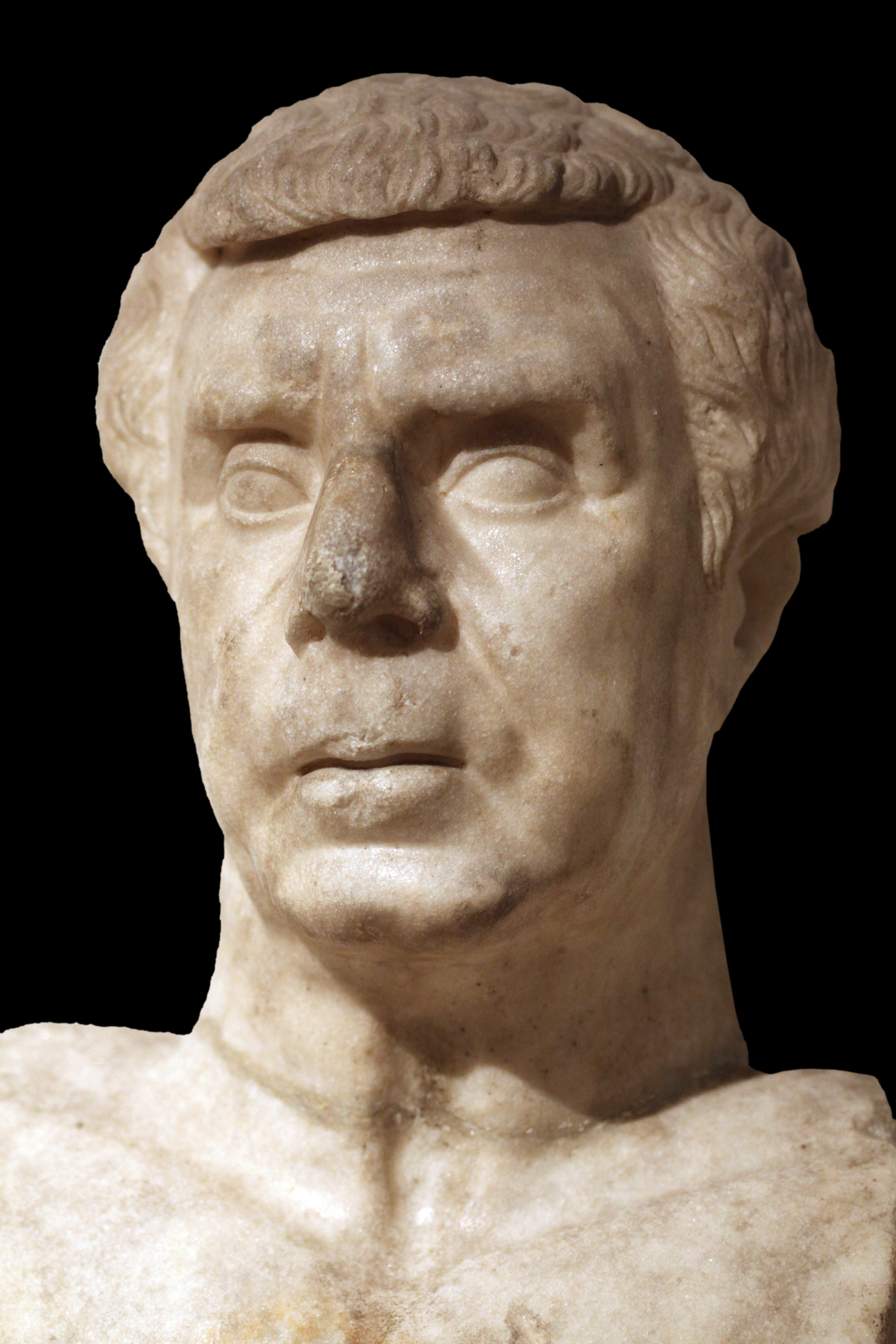
Bust of Munatius Plancus

=== Founding and early history of Lugdunum ===
Lucius Munatius Plancus, a former officer under Julius Caesar, later proconsul of Gallia Comata, is credited with founding Lugdunum in 43 B.C., although the true date of the founding is debated by historians. The colony was named by its founder "Colonia Copia Felix Munatia Lugdunum". Its founding was consistent with the Roman policy of establishing settlements in newly conquered areas, with the aims of ensuring stability and rewarding retired veteran soldiers with land and rights. Similar settlements included the nearby cities of Vienne, Noviodunum , and Augusta Raurica.

At first, the colony was small and not heavily fortified, consisting of raised land and wooden palisades. However, the colony was early favored by its location in a north-south valley between the already Romanized areas in southern Gaul and the more remote areas of northern Gaul and Germany. From the year 20 B.C., the colony served as an operations center for Augustus's campaign to conquer Germania. The colony's governors provided general supervision and management of vast northern territories within Gaul.

=== Development of the city ===
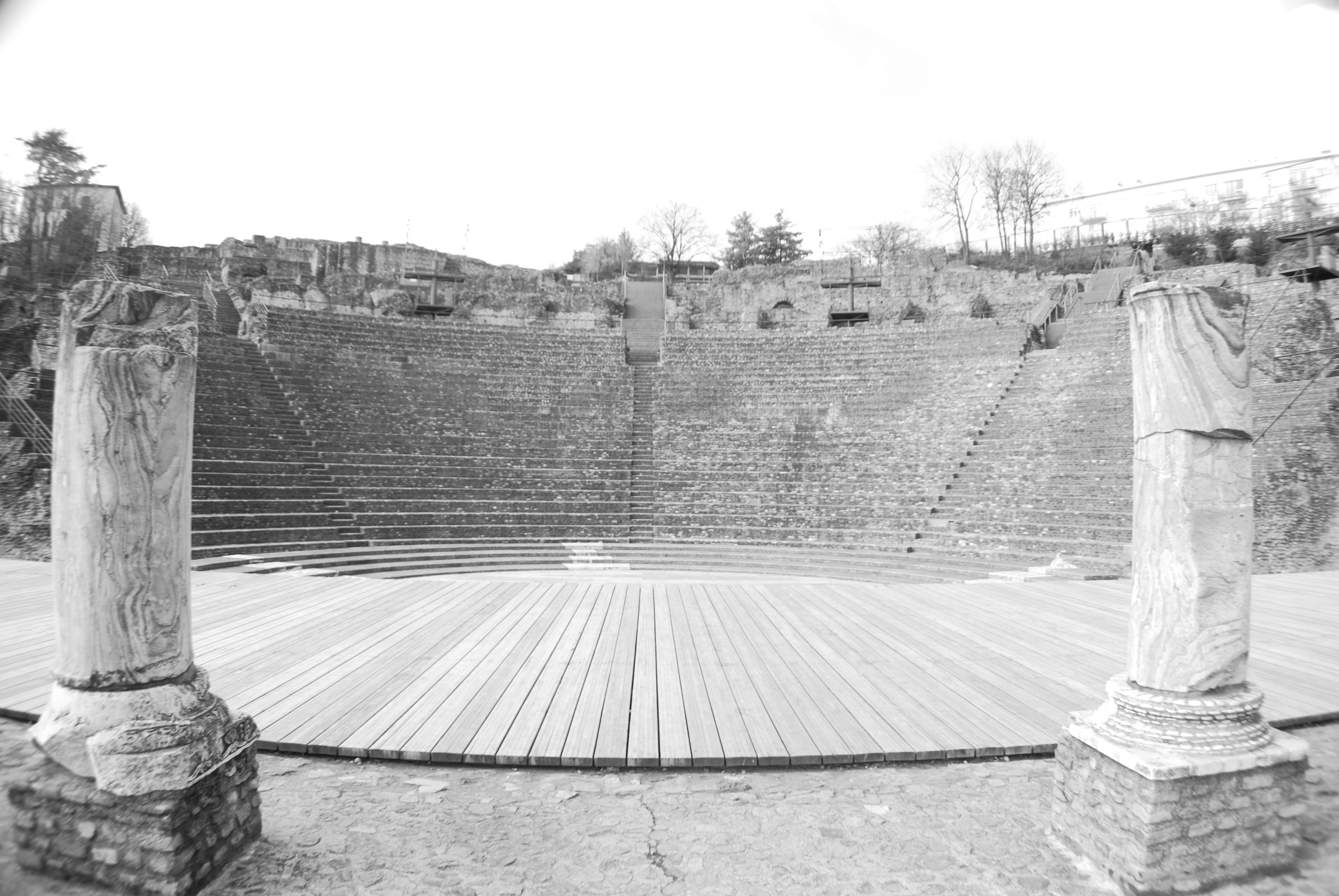
Site archéologique de Fourvière

Aqueducts were likely built between 20 and 10 B.C., and a large number of monuments were also built during the same period. The oldest theater in the three Gauls, which had about 4500 seats, was opened between 16 and 14 B.C. by decree of Augustus. This theater was later expanded under Hadrian to include around 10,700 seats. In 19 AD the Amphitheatre of the Three Gauls was inaugurated, and later enlarged circa 130 AD.

The top of Fourvière hill was the heart of the Roman city during the apogee of its power. The forum, a temple, and probably the Curia and the Basilica, all were located there. During the second century, a Circus was built, but its location is uncertain: this monument was mostly known through a mosaic which depicted it. Antoninus Pius, about 160 AD, created an Odeon of 3000 seats.

Communities of traders thrived, including sailors, vinters, plasterers, and potters. Boards of dignitaries represented the trades and some owned their own cemeteries.

The population increased to nearly 70,000 inhabitants at its height. Lugdunum became one of the greatest and most cosmopolitan cities of Gaul. Many residents, perhaps over a quarter of the population, had Greek names.

=== Integration within the Empire ===
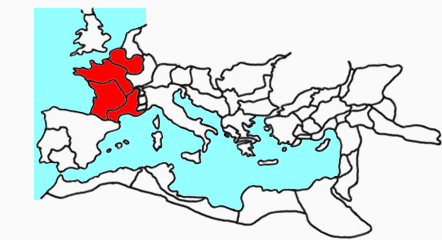
The provinces of Roman Gaul under the Early Roman Empire.

Since its founding, the colony of Lugdunum had the status of Roman colony of right (optimo iure); its citizens had all the political and civic benefits of the Romans, but they paid more direct taxes. We have no texts of city laws.

Lugdunum institutions included two groups: the magistrates and the Roman Senate.

Magistrates were organized into three levels: quaestor, aedile and duumviri. Normally a notable rose in position from the first of these to the last. The quaestors were responsible for raising city funds. The aediles were responsible for the maintenance of roads, thermaes, markets, and public buildings. The duumvirs had judicial functions.

The legate of Roman Gaul resided in Lugdunum and managed its three constituent provinces; Gallia Belgica, Gallia Aquitania and Gallia Lugdunensis. The city acquired a mint. This mint was promoted to the rank of imperial mint in 15 BC. which was a unique privilege throughout the Empire. It remained until 78 AD. This mint briefly appeared again during 196-197 and was recreated by the Emperor Aurelian in 274, in order to fight against the devalued currencies and coin imitations which were very widespread. The workshop was devalued to a supporting rank in 294, when the mint in Trêves's commenced operations The Lugdunum mint remained active until 413.

The priesthood of the Imperial cult was the highest federal administrative office that the Gallic Roman citizens could be elected for. It was held in Lyon, in a temple for which no archaeological evidence remains. Elected by their cities, the priests organized throughout the year, of which the highlight was a ceremony in August. During this ceremony delegates from all Gaul came to worship the emperor.

=== Lugdunum and Roman emperors ===
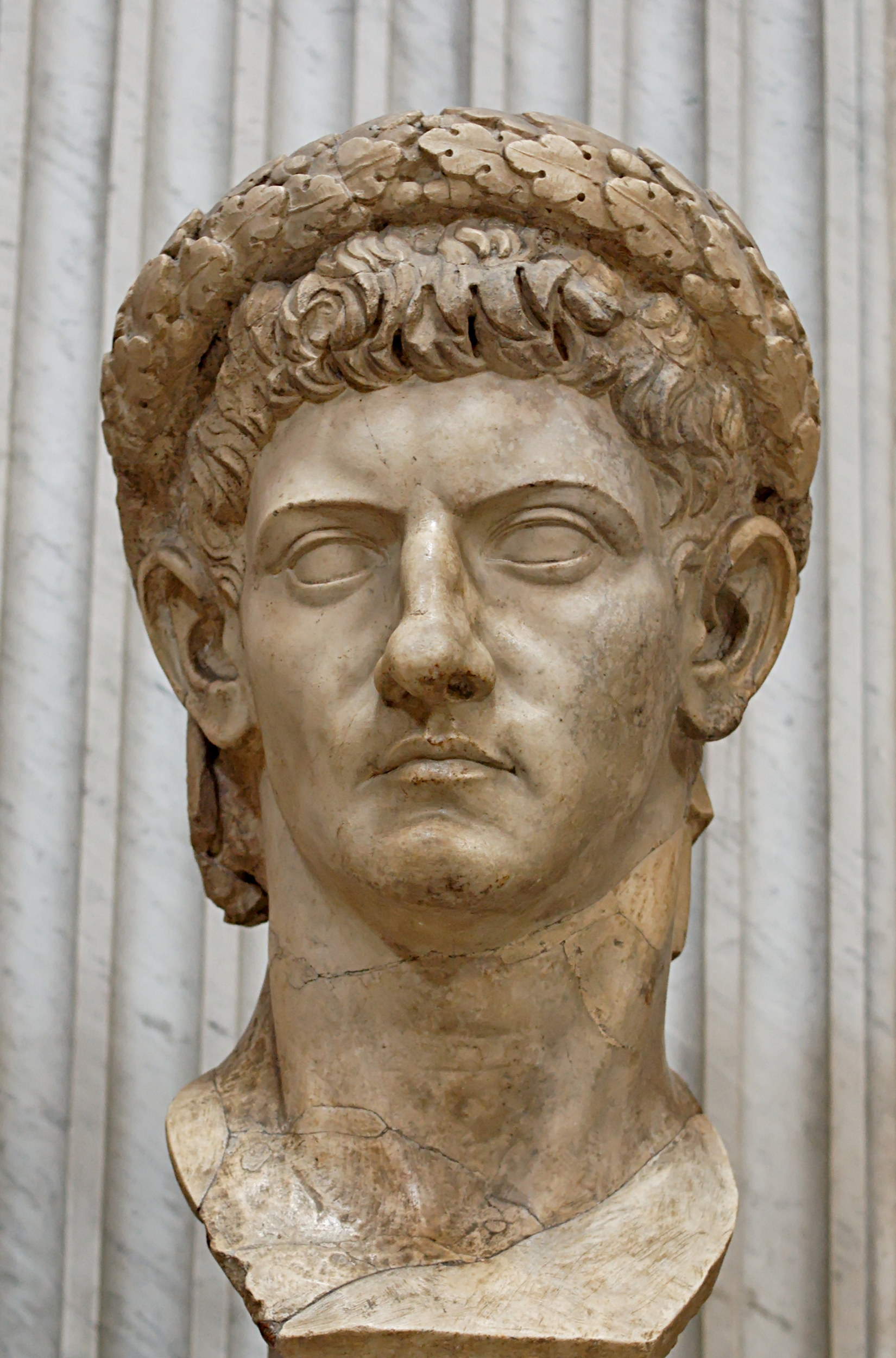
Bust of Claudius

Augustus visited Lugdunum three times between 39 and 8 BC. He ordered a highway improvement of Roman Gaul and gave considerable importance to the city by installing the imperial mint in 15 BC in order to finance his campaigns in Germania. In 12 BC, the Sanctuary of the Three Gauls was inaugurated.

Caligula visited, in 39-40 AD, with Ptolemy of Mauretania, his cousin. This event was celebrated with magnificent performances held in their honor.

Claudius was born in Lugdunum in 10 BC and returned there regularly, especially during his conquest of Britain between 43 and 47 AD. In addition to several archaeological traces of his passages, his speech supporting the entry of Gauls in the Senate, which was transcribed on the Lyon Tablet, was preserved.

Under Nero, in 64 AD, the Romans of Lugdunum supported the victims of the Great Fire of Rome by sending the sum of four million sesterces. The following year, they were themselves victims of another fire, and Nero sent the same amount to rebuild the city. This fire, known only by a text by Seneca, has never been corroborated by archaeological evidence of a fire.

In 68 AD, the legatus of Gallia Lugdunensis, Vindex, revolted against the power of Nero. During this conflict, the people of Vienne besieged Lyon, but had to leave the battlefield after Vindex's defeat. Galba punished Lugdunum for supporting Nero. Later, in the political upheavals during the Year of the Four Emperors, Lugdunum found favor with another emperor, Vitellius, who chastised the people of Vienne.

=== Christianization ===
Christianity was brought to Lugdunum by the Greeks from Asia Minor. In AD 177 the Christian community sent a letter to their co-religionists in Asia Minor, giving the names of 48 of their number who had suffered martyrdom in the Croix-Rousse amphitheatre, among them Pothinus, first Bishop of Lyon. St. Irenaeus, the successor of Pothinus, wrote works of such length and depth that he could be considered the fourth great Christian theologian (see St. Paul of Tarsus, St. John the Apostle, St. Ignatius of Antioch). In the 5th century this intellectual tradition was maintained by another son of Lugdunum, Sidonius Apollinaris.

== Middle ages ==
In the period that followed the collapse of the Roman Empire of the West, Lyon survived as an important urban center. A number of important monastic communities had been established from the 4th to the 6th centuries (Ile Barbe, Saint Martin d'Ainay). In 843 it was assigned to Lotharingia by the Treaty of Verdun, and then passed to the Burgundian kingdom. Many foreigners moved to Lyon once peace was restored, including a large number of Jewish people who traded in luxurious goods (precious stones, metals, jewelry, and fabrics). Pope Gregory VII conferred the title of “Primate of the Gauls” on the Archbishopric of Lyon in 1078. With Frederick Barbarossa's marriage to Béatrice, heiress of the Burgundy counts, the emperor formally recognized in 1157 the de facto ecclesiastical control over the city of Lyon with the Bulle d'Or.

One important aid to Lyon's prosperity was the nascent money-lending industry which facilitated trade with the East, as well as commerce at the Chalon and Champagne fairs. The Third Council of the Lateran (1179) reinforced the Christian prohibition on money-lending as a primary business, while lamenting that usurious practices were widespread. Indeed it was tolerated in Lyon as long as it was conducted either by Jews in the 12th and 13th centuries, or by the Lombard bankers after the expulsion of the Jews from France by the edict of 17 September 1394 and their relocation to neighboring Trévoux, Saint-Symphorien-d'Ozon, and Vienne.

As military monastic orders settled in Lyon in the 12th century, the city became a comfortable stopover and temporary residence for the papacy during the Middle Ages. The coronation of both Clement V (at the Basilica of Saint Justus) and his aged successor John XXII took place in Lyon.

Lyon was the site of an urban revolt in 1436. A century of devastation caused by warfare was exacerbated by the peace of Arras, which brought écorcheurs to the Lyonnais countryside and Charles VII increased both direct (taille) and indirect (gabelle) taxation. The revolt altogether lasted two months, from April until June 6. The angry crowd targeted two main groups: royal commissioners and their bureaucrats and delinquent taxpayers. The most heavily represented groups among the rebels were barbers and beltmakers, i.e. small tradesmen. Charles VII arrived in Lyon on 20 December 1436 and ordered an investigation of the events that was still pending on 19 January 1437. Steyert claims that three inhabitants were sentenced to death, a barber with maiming and one hundred and twenty citizens with banishment.

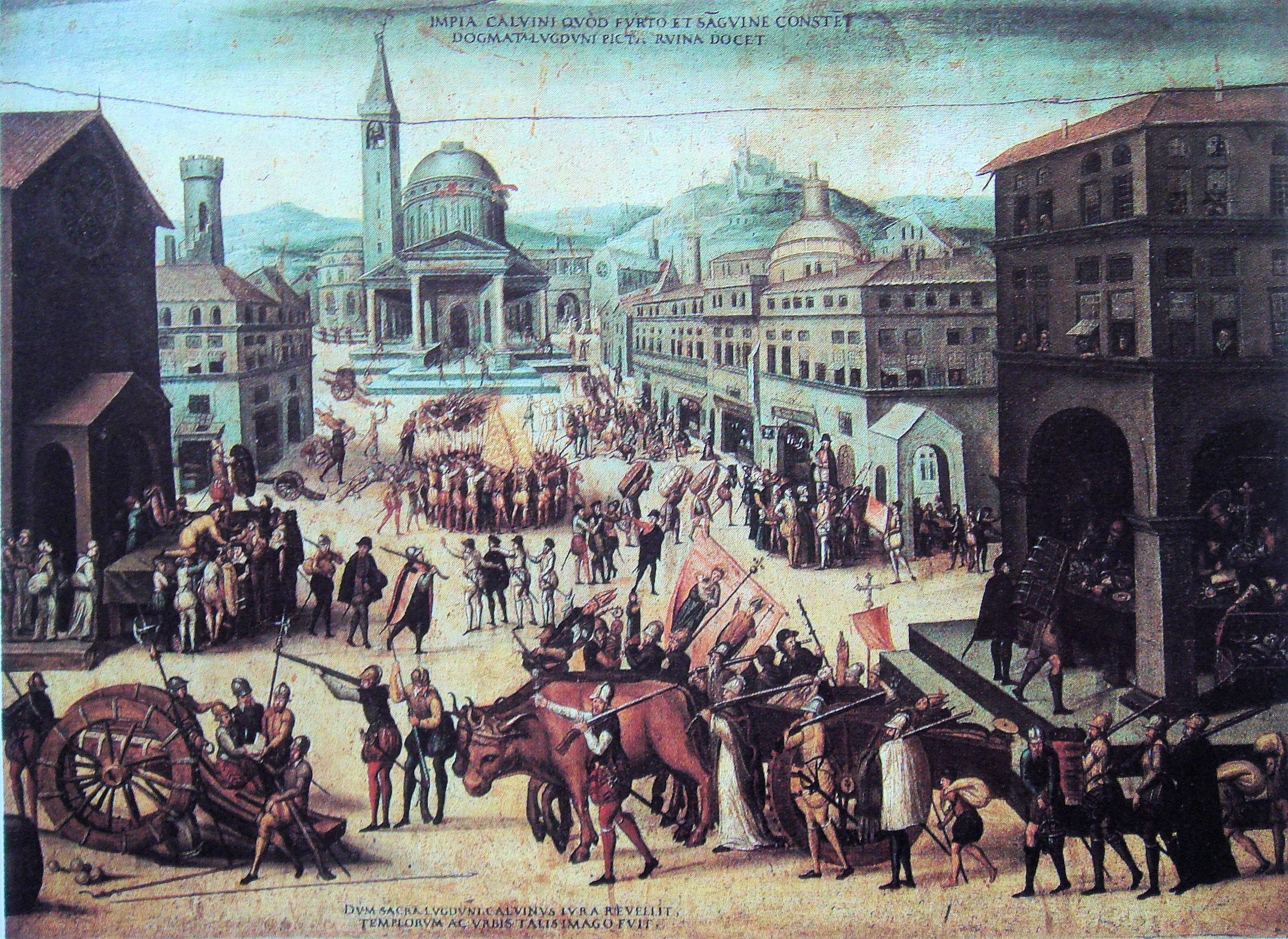
Calvinists take Lyon, 1562

During the reign of Louis XI (1461–83) four annual fairs were established, which drew merchants from all over Europe, especially Italy (and Florence in particular). Lyon became a major center for the spice trade and, even more importantly, the silk trade, following the authorization by François I of weaving privileges, hitherto an Italian monopoly. The Florentine immigrants, through these fairs, made Lyon into an important financial center for banking and insurance.

== Renaissance ==
During the Renaissance Lyon was crowded and grew denser rather than expanding. In the late fifteenth century, the two most heavily populated areas were the right bank of the Saône and along the old Via Mercatoria running from the bridge over the Saône to the Guillotière bridge over the Rhone, home to an urban middle class.

By 1473, the new technology of the printing press had reached Lyon and the workshops were concentrated on rue Mercière on the peninsula between the two rivers. Throughout the Renaissance, Lyon was an important publishing center in Europe producing books in many languages. Editions of works by Erasmus, Rabelais, Scaliger, Étienne Dolet, Thomas More, Poliziano, and many other intellectual leaders were published by the Württemberger Sebastian Gryphius, who was the first Lyon printer to publish works entirely in Greek.

When French policy turned away from Italy in the 1550s, royal visits to Lyon became less frequent. It was also caught up in the religious wars and in 1562 was seized by Protestant troops. The Treaty of Lyon (1601) concluded a war and resulted in large parts of the Dukedom of Savoy being added to the French kingdom. Lyon lost the considerable degree of autonomy that it had hitherto enjoyed, but its commercial and industrial importance were unabated. During the 17th and 18th centuries its preeminence in silk production was unchallenged, with inventors like Vaucanson and Jacquard making far-reaching contributions to this industry. The geographical situation of Lyon meant that many artists and architects passed through it on their way to and from Italy, and their influence can be seen in the buildings of the period, such as the Hôtel-Dieu, the Loge du Change, and the Hôtel de Ville. During the 18th century the expansion resulting from increased prosperity indicated the need for a measure of systematic town planning, and this was carried out by a series of planners and architects such as de Cotte, Soufflot, Morand, and Antoine-Michel Perrache.

== The French Revolution (1789) ==
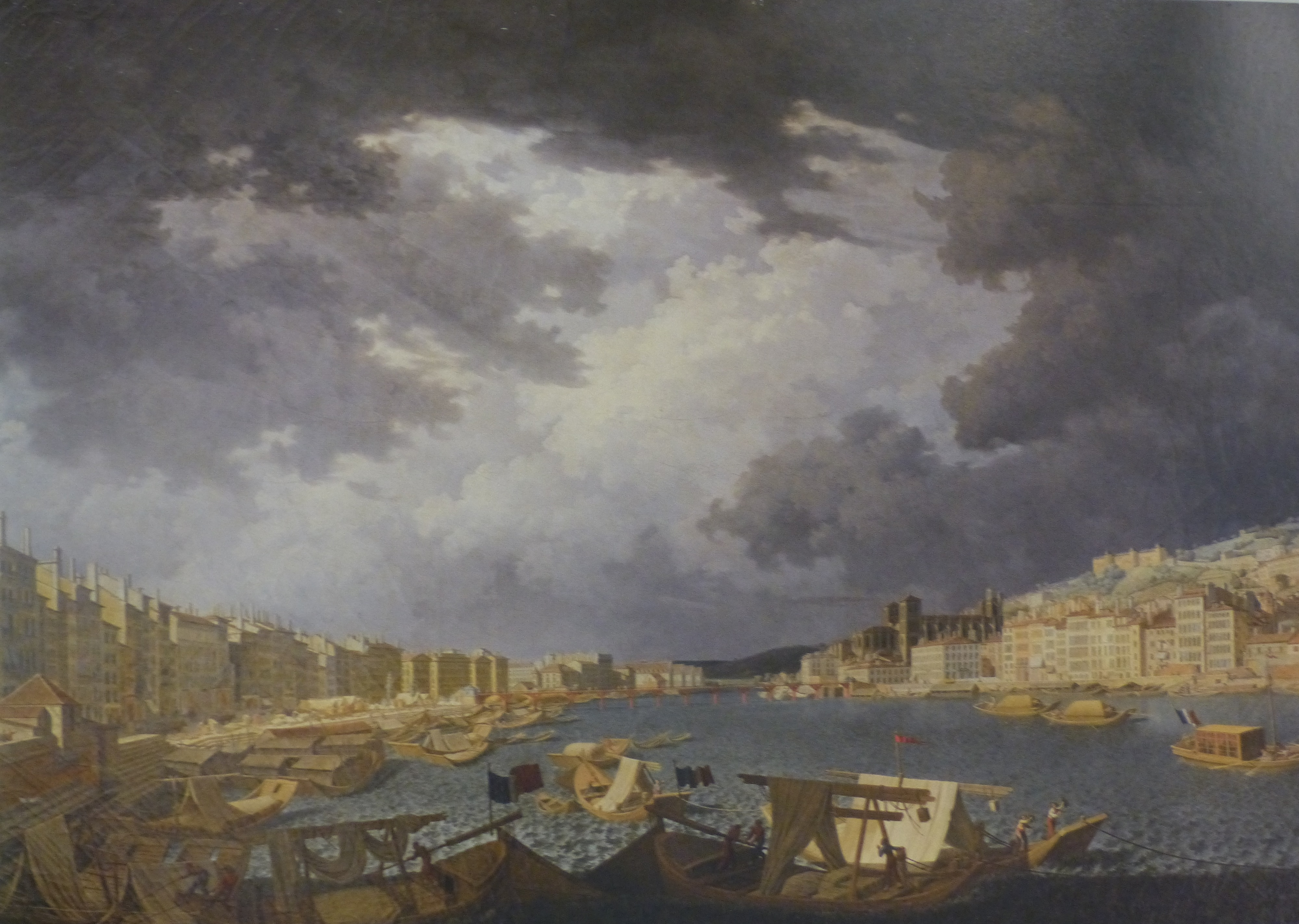
View of Lyon from the left bank of the Saône river, painted by Charles François Nivard (1804).

The French Revolution put an end to this quiet and prosperous period. In 1793, Lyon chose to support the Girondists against the "Convention" (the government that reigned from September 1792 to September 1795), in what became known as the revolt of Lyon against the National Convention and was considered too royalist. As a result, the city had to endure a 2-month siege. During the French Revolution, 2000 people were shot or decapitated in Lyon. The architectural work was suspended and numerous frontages were ruined, especially in the Place Bellecour neighborhood.

== The Canuts revolt (1831) ==
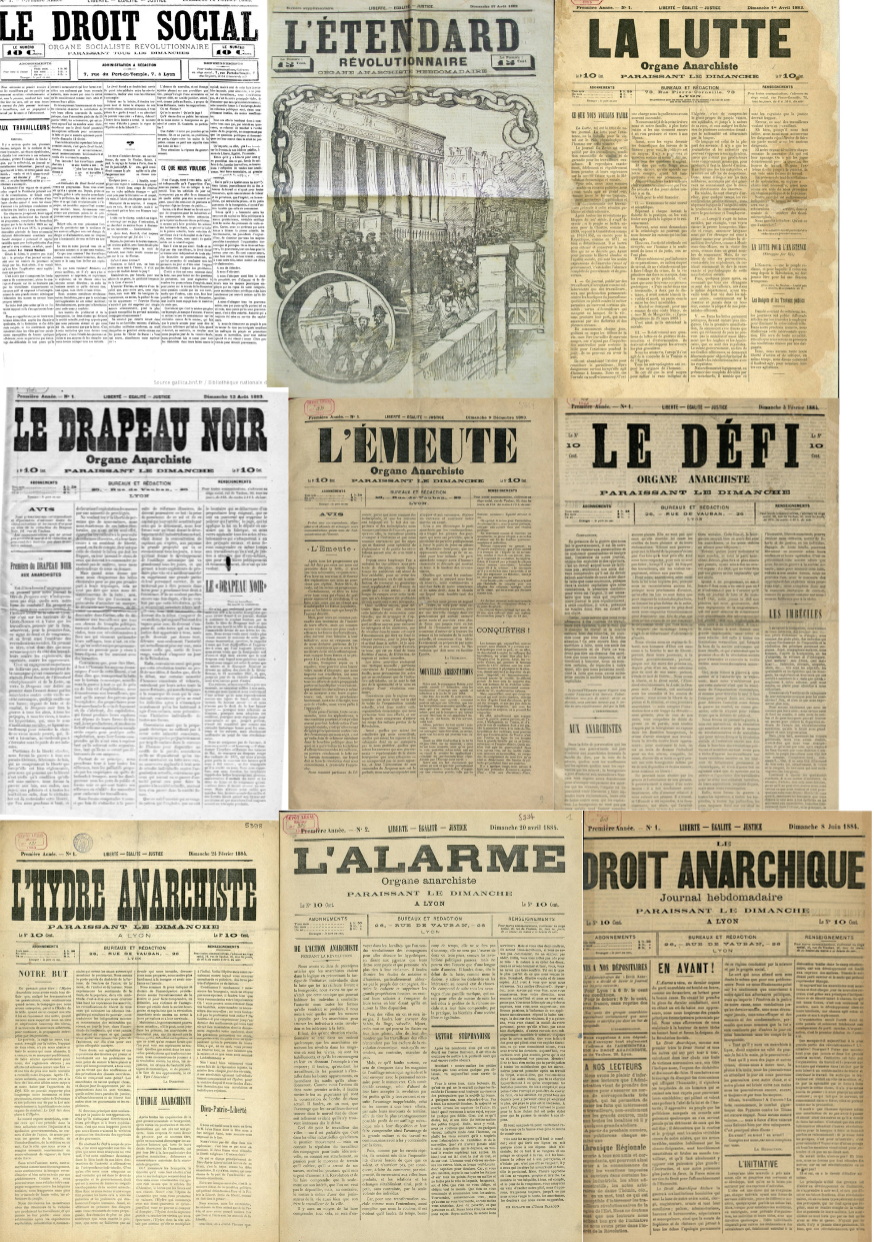
First period of the Lyon anarchist press, spanning from 1882 to 1884 and comprising nine newspapers

As in all the then French Kingdom, the French Revolution in 1789 brought a brutal halt to expansion. But development was re-vitalized under the Napoleonic Empire. Lyon became an industrial city and pursued its urban development with a distinct preference for the Haussman style prevalent at the time. Though the Canut revolts – revolt of silk weavers – tarnished the era, Lyon enjoyed an undeniable power which it carried into the 20th century.

== Third Republic and anarchism (1870-1914) ==
The end of the 19th century was marked by a strong anarchist presence in the city, to the point that the city was considered one of the movement's capitals during that era. At the beginning of the 1880s, increasingly strained relations between anarchists and the French State led to escalating conflicts. On 23 October 1882, the Assommoir restaurant was targeted by Fanny Madignier and other anarchists: this was the Assommoir bombing, carried out as vengeance against the Lyonnese bourgeoisie for the ongoing repression of the anarchist movement, accused of being in links with the Montceau-les-Mines troubles and the Black Band. The attack killed one person, making it the first lethal act of propaganda by the deed in French history. This attack served as the pretext for the Trial of the 66 in January 1883. In 1894, French president Sadi Carnot, who had attracted the ire of anarchists, was assassinated on his way to the Exposition universelle, internationale et coloniale at the Parc de la Tête d'or.

In parallel, the anarchist press in Lyon entered its first period, featuring a series of closely related newspapers that succeeded one another following various bans; these included Le Droit social, L'Étendard révolutionnaire, La Lutte, Le Drapeau noir, L'Émeute, Le Défi, L'Hydre anarchiste, L'Alarme, and Le Droit anarchique.

== Modern times ==
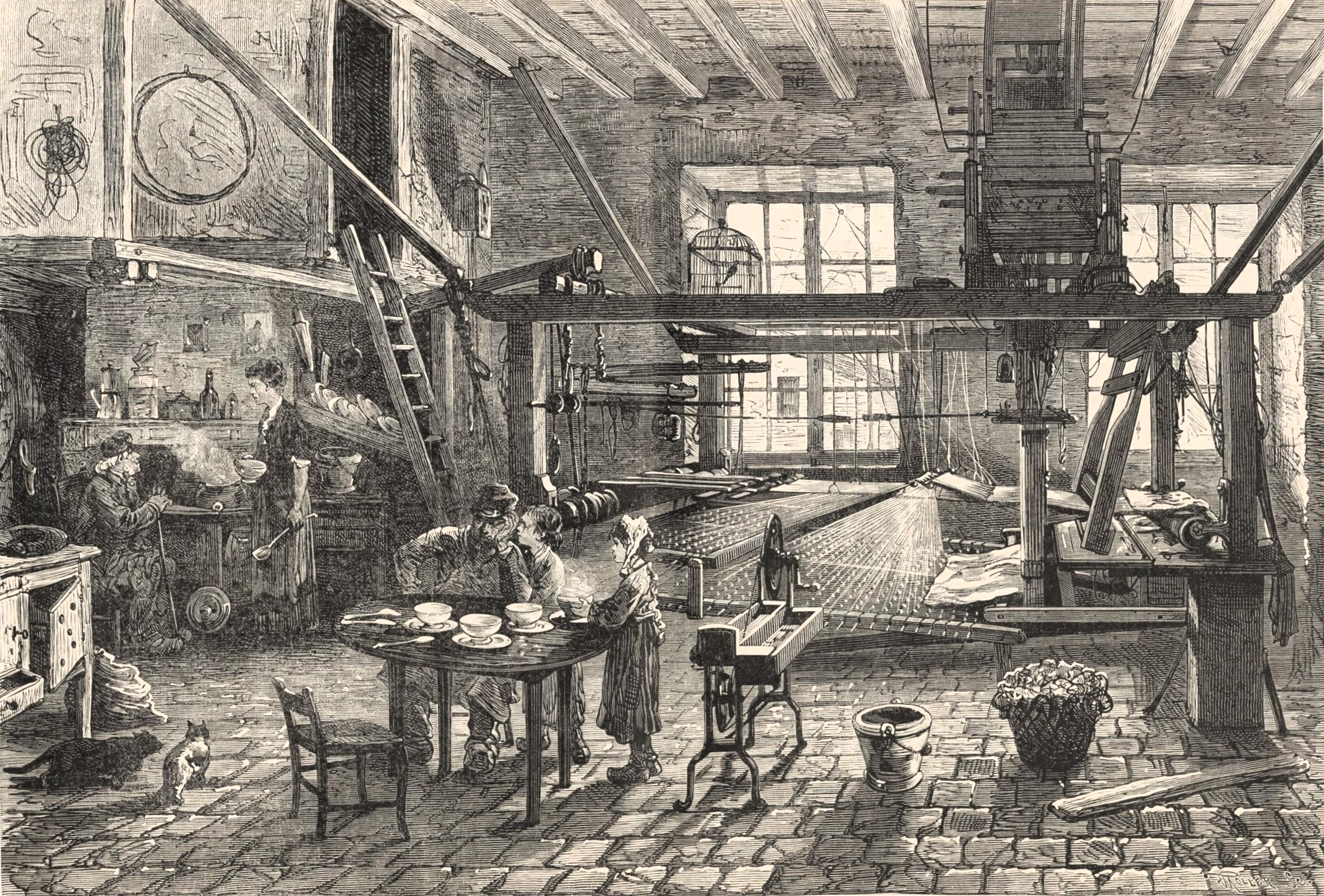
A silk weaving manufacture in Lyon, 1877

=== Urban and demographic transformations ===
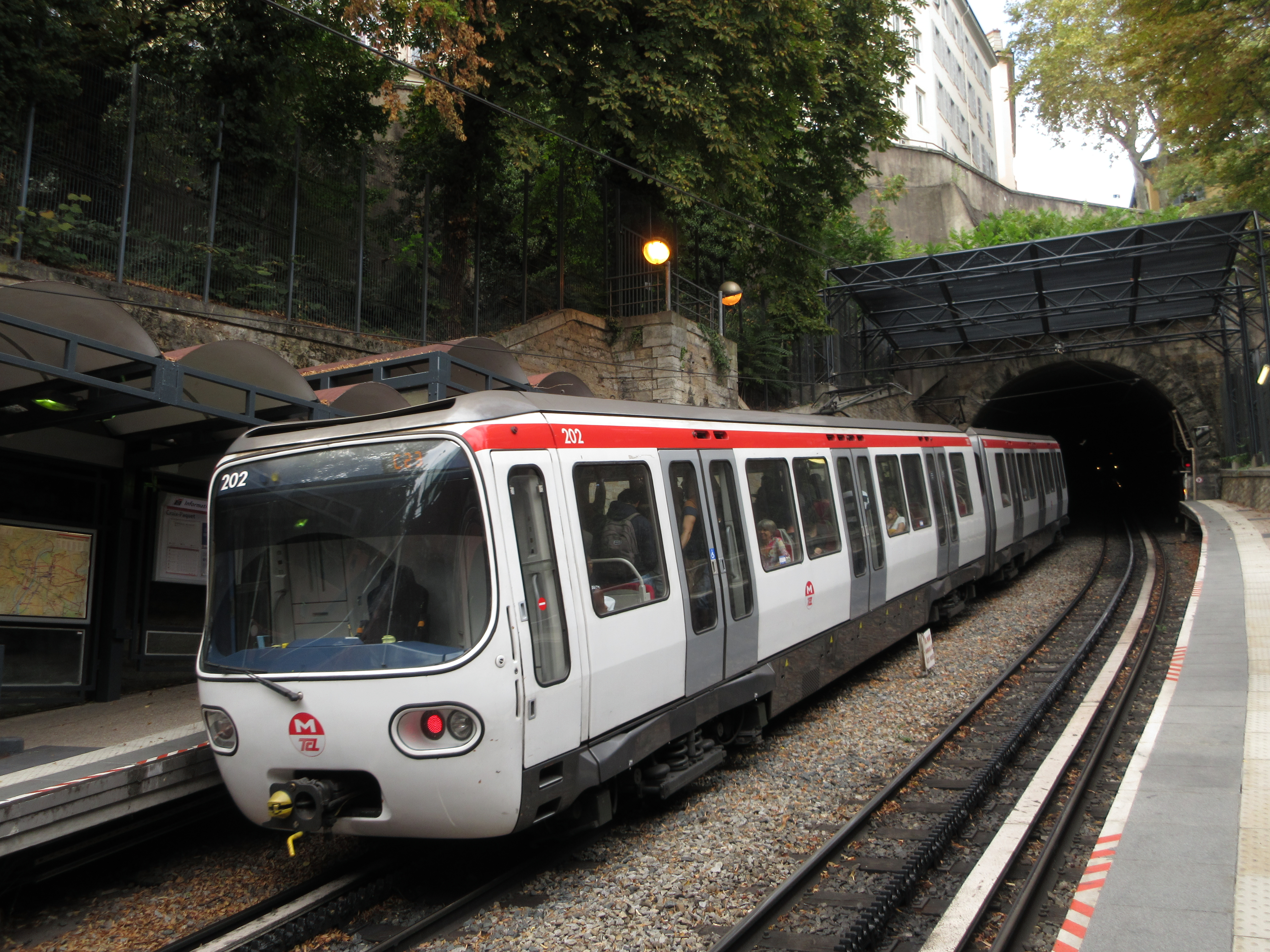
Metro line C, opened in 1974.

During the Trente Glorieuses, the thirty years of postwar economic expansion, Lyon experienced significant demographic growth. Between 1946 and 1968, the city’s population increased from 442,000 to 527,000 inhabitants, representing a 20% rise. The suburban population grew even more rapidly, from 348,000 to 595,000 inhabitants, a 70% increase. This trend reflected a nationwide pattern of urban expansion. In Lyon, growth occurred mainly to the east, continuing a long-term development dynamic. From the 1970s onward, urbanization became more pronounced on the metropolitan outskirts, while the populations of the central municipalities stabilized. This process was accompanied by a decline in population density, as the doubling of inhabitants spread over an area approximately seven times larger.

Large housing complexes were constructed on the outskirts of Lyon, including La Duchère—initially built to accommodate repatriates from Algeria—along with Mermoz and Rillieux. Modernization during this period led to several major infrastructure projects, such as the creation of the La Part-Dieu business district, the construction of the Fourvière highway tunnel, and the inauguration of the metro system in 1978. Urban expansion also encouraged the development of the new town of L’Isle-d’Abeau and the construction of a new airport at Colombier-Saugnieu, named Satolas, which replaced Bron Airport. In June 2000, the airport was renamed Lyon–Saint-Exupéry Airport.

From the 1980s onward, Lyon and Villeurbanne increasingly concentrated higher-level professions, including executives, industrialists, and members of liberal professions, while the surrounding suburbs—particularly in the eastern metropolitan area—had a higher proportion of workers, manual laborers, and employees.

Since the 1980s, demographic trends in the Lyon metropolitan area have shifted. The central city, including Villeurbanne, experienced population growth, while some nearby suburban municipalities saw a decline in residents. Census data indicate that the population of Lyon increased from 415,500 in 1990 to 445,400 in 1999, and then to 479,800 in 2009.

=== Economic developments ===
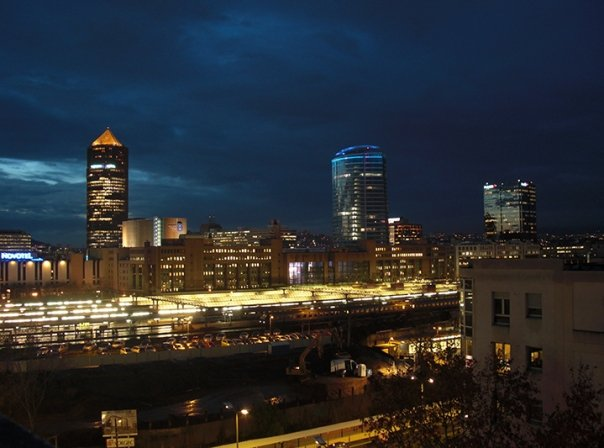
The Part-Dieu district, symbol of Lyon's shift towards the service industry

At the end of the Second World War, Lyon’s economy was strongly industrial, encompassing both traditional sectors, such as metallurgy, and emerging ones, including chemistry and mechanical engineering, a profile that persisted until the 1960s. In the following decade, the metropolitan area’s economic structure evolved, gradually establishing Lyon as a major French tertiary center.

Industries that experienced the most significant decline included textiles, particularly silk, as well as the manufacture of electrical components and metalworking. The chemical and automotive mechanical sectors, however, maintained substantial activity. Although the number of industrial establishments decreased only slightly, the share of industry within the active population declined notably during the 1980s and 1990s.

By the 2000s, Lyon’s industrial sector was concentrated in four main areas: chemistry and pharmaceuticals, including companies such as Arkema, Sanofi-Pasteur, and BioMérieux; metallurgy and mechanical engineering, with Renault Trucks; electricity, including Alstom and Areva; and software development, with firms such as Hewlett-Packard and Cegid, alongside the textile industry. Additional activity occurred in construction, agri-food, and logistics.=

=== Political history ===
==== Lyon under the Fourth Republic ====
Under the long-standing leadership of Édouard Herriot (1905–1957), postwar elections represented a significant political moment in Lyon. In the first municipal elections after the war, held in 1945, a broad alliance formed around Herriot, bringing together groups including the Popular Republican Movement (MRP), the General Confederation of Labour (CGT), and the French Communist Party (PCF). However, by the constituent elections for the Fourth Republic in October 1945, the Radical Party experienced a substantial decline, finishing fourth in most districts.

By 1947, in line with the national political climate shaped by the early Cold War, the French Communist Party (PCF) withdrew from alliances and positioned itself in opposition to other major political forces. Local branches supported the strikes that occurred in November 1947. The PCF’s relative isolation contributed to the dominance of the Rally of the French People (RPF) in Lyon, particularly in the municipal elections of 1947 and the legislative elections of 1951, surpassing both the SFIO and the Radical Party. During this period, a moderate right emerged, represented by the National Centre of Independents and Peasants (CNI).

Édouard Herriot was elected mayor in 1947 and again in 1953, although in both cases without an absolute majority. His personal authority, often referred to as that of the “eternal mayor,” contributed to his election, as elected officials from other parties frequently accepted alternative positions of responsibility. During these years, a form of public recognition developed around Herriot, including celebrations of his successive elections and the publication of works highlighting his career. This recognition primarily originated within certain intellectual circles, and it is unclear to what extent it was shared by the broader public. A large crowd, however, attended his funeral in March 1957. Herriot’s cautious and frugal management helped maintain moderate local taxes, but also slowed the implementation of major modernization projects in the city.

==== Lyon under the Fifth Republic ====
At the beginning of the Fifth Republic, Lyon generally reflected national political trends. Candidates from the Union for the New Republic (UNR) won most available seats in the 1958 and 1962 elections, and General de Gaulle’s proposals received broad support. In the 1965 presidential election, the left-wing candidate François Mitterrand outperformed de Gaulle in the eastern and southern suburbs of Lyon. Within the city itself, de Gaulle received 39% of the vote, compared with 44% nationally.

===== Achievements of Louis Pradel =====
Louis Pradel was the mayor who oversaw the morphological transformation of Lyon. During his tenure, he commissioned the construction of sports halls, cultural facilities, and social infrastructure throughout the city. He was also involved, though not always as the initiator, in numerous large-scale projects, including the construction of the Part-Dieu complex with the municipal library, the large Duchère housing estate, the Fourvière tunnel and Perrache interchange, the Fourvière archaeological museum, and the new rose garden in the Parc de la Tête d’Or.

Pradel advocated for urban development that accommodated heavy automobile traffic, supporting the connection of the A6 and A7 highways via a tunnel running through Fourvière and along the Rhône embankments. The project, whose consequences were not fully anticipated, has contributed to ongoing traffic challenges and has been one of the most discussed aspects of his tenure.

===== Creation of Greater Lyon =====
In 1968, Lyon and the surrounding communes were incorporated into a new intercommunal structure, initially called Courly and later renamed Grand Lyon. The urban community marked a significant development in intermunicipal cooperation compared with previous single-purpose or multipurpose syndicates. Grand Lyon was responsible for managing urban transport, overseeing urban planning—including large-scale projects—and administering services such as drinking water, sanitation, waste management, and urban policy.

===== Continuity under Francisque Collomb: 1976–1989 =====
At the beginning of the 1970s, the Socialist Party gained influence in Lyon. In the 1971 and 1973 elections, moderate right-wing forces, organized around the mayor, won, but with a narrower margin than in the previous decade. The suburbs, where François Mitterrand had gained support in 1965, increasingly favored him, while the French Communist Party (PCF) experienced a decline. This trend culminated in 1981, when Lyon largely followed the national pattern by supporting the left-wing presidential candidate and electing six Socialist deputies out of ten constituencies.

At the local level, Lyon exhibited continuity in political leadership. Following the death of Louis Pradel in 1976, his designated successor, Francisque Collomb, established his position and won the 1977 municipal elections, with lists still associated with the P.R.A.D.E.L. movement. This local, “non-partisan” grouping continued in subsequent elections, including its opposition to the Rally for the Republic (RPR) under Michel Noir. During the 1970s and 1980s, local political trends reflected broader national patterns, including a decline in the French Communist Party (PCF) vote and an increase in support for the National Front.

== See also ==
- Timeline of Lyon
- Ceintures de Lyon
- Cognet de Seynes
- List of books about the history of Lyon
- List of people from Lyon
- Roman Catholic Archdiocese of Lyon
- Second Council of Lyon
- Traboule
- History of silk production in Lyon
- Lyon during the Renaissance

== Bibliography ==
- Fédou, René (2006). Les papes du moyen âge à Lyon: De Urbain II à Jean XXII (1095-1316) (in French). Lyon: Editions Lyonnaises d'Art et d'Histoire. p. 127. ISBN 2-84147-168-3.
- Pelletier, André; Rossiaud, Jacques; Bayard, Françoise; Cayez, Pierre (2007). Histoire de Lyon des origines à nos jours (in French). Lyon: Editions Lyonnaises d'Art et d'Histoire. p. 954. ISBN 978-2-84147-190-4.
- Poux, Mathieu; Savay-Guerraz, Hugues (2003). Lyon avant Lugdunum (in French). Gollion: Infolio. ISBN 2-88474-106-2.
- Sauzay, Laurent (1998). Louis Pradel, maire de Lyon : Voyage au cœur du pouvoir municipal [Louis Pradel, Mayor of Lyon: Journey to the heart of municipal power] (in French). Lyon: Éditions lyonnaises d'Art et d'Histoire. ISBN 2-84147-074-1.
- Vigne, Marcel (1903). La banque à Lyon du 15e au 18e siècle (in French). Lyon: A. Rey.
