= Blackstar (TV series) =

American animated fantasy television series

- Promotional poster
- Voices of: George DiCenzo; Linda Gary; Alan Oppenheimer; Patrick Pinney; Frank Welker
- Composers: Yvette Blais; Jeff Michael
- Country of origin: United States
- Original language: English
- No. of episodes: 13

Production
- Producers: Norm Prescott; Lou Scheimer
- Running time: 21 minutes
- Production company: Filmation

Original release
- Network: CBS
- Release: September 12 – December 5, 1981

Blackstar is an American animated science fantasy television series, produced in 1981 by Lou Scheimer and Norm Prescott for Filmation. The series was Filmation's second fantasy epic, the first being The Freedom Force, a segment of Tarzan and the Super 7. Blackstar has similarities to He-Man and the Masters of the Universe which was produced shortly afterwards.

== Story ==
John Blackstar is an astronaut from Earth, stranded on the planet Sagar after his spacecraft was swept into a black hole, taking him to an ancient alien universe. On Sagar, Blackstar allies himself with the Trobbits, the shape-changing Klone, the "dragon-horse" Warlock, and Mara the Enchantress. Blackstar and his allies oppose the Overlord, who seeks to take over Sagar.

=== Future Earth ===
Little is known about Blackstar's Earth, though its technology is undoubtedly far advanced, as evidenced by Blackstar's "photon-based" ship and Katana's "fusion-drive" timeship capable of multidimensional travel. Neither Blackstar nor Katana bear any insignia related to any agencies in the real world. Blackstar's insignia appears on his golden collar.

=== Planet Sagar ===
Sagar, where John Blackstar ends up being stranded, is located in an ancient alien universe. It is subject to attacks by the evil Overlord, who seeks to conquer the planet.

=== John Blackstar ===
The titular character's ethnicity is unspecified, though it is often speculated that he could have Native American heritage and ancestry, anticipating Bravestarr, a later Filmation series, by roughly six years.

As an astronaut, Blackstar might have been extensively trained in many fields. He is intelligent, and he often prefers to outsmart his opponent rather than rely on physical talent, even though his constant contact with the Starsword grants him super-human athletic abilities and near invulnerability.

=== The Powerstar's two halves ===
The Powerstar was a mighty magical weapon that was split in two through unknown events, with Blackstar and the Overlord each possessing one half. Blackstar's weapon, the Starsword, is able to absorb, store, and reflect any external form of energy, and is virtually indestructible. It can also produce blasts of pure energy capable of destroying a target. The weapon generates an invisible "aura" that imbues Blackstar with superhuman senses, strength, endurance, reflexes, speed, agility, and almost unlimited invulnerability to harm and extreme temperatures. Presumably, the Overlord's Powersword confers similar abilities. For a brief time in the episode Spacewrecked, the Starsword and the Powersword are re-joined into the Powerstar.

=== Blackstar's fate ===
In the sixth episode, "Spacewrecked", Blackstar was briefly reached by his former Earth girlfriend, Lieutenant Katana, who spent some time on Sagar before a misadventure with the Overlord forced her to leave. Katana did not appear in any other episodes, although the story ended with her asking a superior for permission to organize an armed rescue mission.

== Characters ==
=== Main ===
- John Blackstar (voiced by George DiCenzo) – The main protagonist, an astronaut who ends up stranded on the planet Sagar where he takes part in the battles against Overlord.
- Warlock – A winged, green mount "dragon-horse". He is intelligent and agile in flight and is able to breathe fire like all dragons; the fire breath does not affect the dragon-horse bit in his mouth.
- Klone (voiced by Patrick Pinney) – A tall, pale green elf-like shapeshifter with long white hair and a ready wit who assists Blackstar against the Overlord.
- Mara (voiced by Linda Gary) – A purple-skinned enchantress who is Blackstar's ally. She is capable of telekinesis, telepathy, levitation, forcefield projection, illusions, magic blasts, and teleportation. In "City of the Ancient Ones", it is revealed that she is at least a few centuries old.
- Trobbits – A portmanteau of troll and hobbit, they are the inhabitants of the Sagar Tree. The pink-skinned, white-haired little Trobbits rescue Blackstar upon his arrival on Sagar. The Trobbits are likely inspired by the Seven Dwarfs and some of its members are packaged with the good guy action figures. Some of the known Trobbits are:
  - Balkar (voiced by Patrick Pinney) – The king of the Trobbits and the mentor of John Blackstar. He controls elemental magic and is also a great alchemist.
  - Rif (voiced by Frank Welker) – The Trobbits' grumpy, flame-capped cook.
  - Terra (voiced by Patrick Pinney) – The gardener who talks to plants.
  - Burble (voiced by Frank Welker) – The babbler who swims very well and freezes during the winter.
  - Carpo (voiced by Alan Oppenheimer) – The carpenter who gnaws wood with his beaver-like teeth to construct things.
  - Poulo – The mute whistler and youngest of the Trobbits.
  - Gossamear (voiced by Frank Welker) – The huge-eared flying one who is the scout and lookout.

=== Villains ===
- Overlord (voiced by Alan Oppenheimer) – The primary antagonist of the series. The large, muscular purple-skinned tyrant plots to rule all of the planet Sagar and wields one half of the PowerStar called the Power Sword and constantly seeks the other half the Star Sword which John Blackstar now wields.
  - Vizier (voiced by Alan Oppenheimer) – Overlord's short, blue-skinned and purple-robed right-hand man and companion. He is an expert at mind-control and conjuring.
  - Palace Guards – Only appearing in "The Quest", they are the Overlord's beak-faced minions who guard the Ice Palace.
- Lava Locs – They appear in "Search for the Star Sword" and "Spacewrecked". The Lava Locs are semi-intelligent fire-breathing volcanic reptilian creatures that can harden into volcanic stone and emerge from volcanic stone. They worship the Overlord and present him offerings at their temple.
- Alien Demons – They appear in two episodes. In "Spacewrecked", they appear as minions of the Overlord and Vizier. In "The Crown of the Sorceress", they are summoned by Taleena. The Alien Demons look a bit like evil gremlins and their toy figures came with each villain character.
- Taleena (voiced by Linda Gary) – Only appearing in "Crown of the Sorceress", Taleena is a high priestess of the Demonlands and one of the minions of the Overlord. She was last seen consumed by the demonfire of her own making.
- Shaldemar (voiced by Alan Oppenheimer) – Only appearing in "The Zombie Master", Shaldemar is an ally of the Overlord and the ruler of Marakand. Shaldemar was last seen turning to smoke after a blast from the Star Sword shattered the Sphere of Souls which released the captured spirits.
- Isogul – Only appearing in "The Air Whales of Ancar", he is the king of the Vampire Men who blasts the Star Sword with evil magic, making it unstable. The evil can only be purged by the song of the Air Whales of Ancar.
- Nihilis (voiced by Alan Oppenheimer) – Only appearing in "The Air Whales of Ancar", Nihilis is the captain of a flying whaling ship when he tries to capture the Air Whales and turn them into servants of the Overlord. His daughter Lyla is trying to get him to see the error of his ways.
- Kadray (voiced by Alan Oppenheimer) – Only appearing in "Lord of Time", Kadray is a time lord. He uses a time scepter to control time. His powers in the end backfire and is turned into a baby. Kadray was last seen in the care of the desert sprites.
  - Triton – Kadray's flying bull.
- Neptul (voiced by Alan Oppenheimer) – Only appearing in "Kingdom of Neptul", Neptul is the ruler of Aquaria and a servant of the Overlord. He attempted to steal the Star Sword from Blackstar.
- Typhot (voiced by Alan Oppenheimer) – Only appearing in "The Mermaid of Serpent Sea", Typhot is the captain of a group of undead pirates and enemies of the Mermanites. He is an ancestor of the Overlord. Typhot was last seen as a flying manta ray flying to Overlord's icy castle.
  - Sirk – Only appearing in "The Mermaid of the Serpent Sea", Sirk is Typhot's first mate.
- Breelorand – Only appearing in "Overlord's Big Spell", it is a giant magic-consuming demon that Overlord foolishly summoned to destroy the rebellion that went out of control. Breelorand's rampage forced the Overlord to team up with Blackstar to defeat it as it began destroying the planet Sagar.
- Crios (voiced by Alan Oppenheimer) – Only appearing in "Lightning City in the Clouds", Crios is an Ice King whom the Overlord sends to capture Lelanna and use the special key she has to open the Box of Seasons and obtain the Weatherseed for the Overlord's purpose. In exchange, Overlord would have him rule winter on Overlord's behalf. When the key was destroyed and the Box of Seasons opened, Crios vanished in the dawning spring.

=== Supporting and minor ===
- Amber (voiced by Linda Gary) – Only appearing in "City of the Ancient Ones", Amber is a sorceress who is hundreds of years old and is worshiped by the Cave Apes. With the help of Vizier, the Overlord awakens her from her crystallized sleep and forces her to lead him to Tamboriyon. At the Overlord's command, Amber imprisons Klone and the Trobbits. She is redeemed by Blackstar and Mara. While Amber herself is human, she has a gnarled monstrous hand for reasons that were left unexplained.
- Storm (voiced by Linda Gary) – Only appearing in "The Lord of Time", she is Queen of the Amazons and ally of Blackstar.
- Tholen – Only appearing in "The Lord of Time". He is king of the Desert Sprites, a race of pacifists who guard the Fountain of Fire from evil.
- Queen Brindell – Only appearing in "The Mermaid of Serpent Sea", she is the Queen of the Mermanites and ally of the Trobbits.
- Puffin – Only appearing in "The Mermaid of the Serpent Sea", she is an extremely chatty Mermanite child who befriends Poulo.
- Tyson – Only appearing in "The Quest", he is the Elder of the Desert Dwellers who guard the Healing Stone.
- Emerald Knight – Only appearing in "The Quest", she started out as a servant of the Overlord who gave her armor that restored her youth. Realizing the error of her ways, Emerald Knight decided to stay with the Desert Dwellers and help guard the Healing Stone.
- Leilanna (voiced by Linda Gary) – Only appearing in "Lightning City in the Clouds", she is keeper of the key to the Box of Seasons and possibly a demigoddess. Her opposite counterpart is King Crios.
- Flame People – Only appearing in "Kingdom of Neptul", they are fire elementals who help Blackstar and the Trobbits fight Neptul and his Amphimen.
- Delia – Only appearing in "Tree of Evil", she is a Wood Sprite whose forest is tainted by evil when the Overlord creates an evil copy of the Sagar Tree as a trap for Blackstar and Klone.
- Lyla – Appearing in "The Air Whales of Ancar", she is the daughter of Nihilus who falls in love with Blackstar and helps him defeat her father. She vows to make her father change his ways.
- Grogon – Only appearing in "The Air Whales of Ancar", he is an Ape Man who speaks in the third person. Grogon helps Blackstar rebel against Nihilus.
- Warhoun – Only appearing in "The Air Whales of Ancar", he's an ancient and powerful Air Whale who befriends Gossamear.
- Thorg – Only appearing in "Crown of the Sorceress", he is the leader of a people imprisoned by the evil magic of Taleena. He becomes an ally of Blackstar.
- Prince Dal and Princess Loweena – Only appearing in "The Zombie Masters", they are the co-rulers of the city of Gondar. It is destroyed by Shaldemar, but Blackstar defeats him with Prince Dal's help. Dal and Loweena claim the floating city of Marakand as the new home for their people, becoming powerful allies to Blackstar and friends.

== Locations ==
Among the identified locations on Sagar are:

- Anchar – A region that is home to the Air Whales and scattered vampire men tribes.
- Aquaria – An undersea kingdom ruled by Neptul.
- Demonlands – A barren landscape in the west where the demons live.
- Flame Mountain – A volcanic mountain chain near Tamboriyon.
- Gondar – A city ruled by Prince Dal and Princess Lowena. It was destroyed by Shaldemar.
- Gorge of the Winds – A deep canyon with winds that make it hard to fly through. Anyone wanting to go through it would use a rope and pulley system.
- Highlands – Home of the Druids.
- Ice Castle – Overlord's base.
- Kaymus – The kingdom that Taleena took over.
- Magnetic Sea – The city of Aquaria is located here. All compasses will have their readings thrown off.
- Marakand – The floating city of zombies.
- Red Crown Reef – A crown-shaped reef located in the Sea of Tranquility.
- Sagar Tree – A giant tree that is a source of the powerful white magic of Sagar. The Trobbits live here.
- Sea of Tranquility – The Mermanites live here.
- Tamboriyon – The ruined city of the Ancient Ones that is filled with ancient secrets.
- Tree of Evil – An evil clone of the Sagar Tree created by Overlord.

== Broadcast ==
The premiere episode aired September 12, 1981, and the entire series original run lasted until December of that year. After its cancellation, Blackstar was re-run during the 1982–83 season. Despite favorable ratings from that 1982–83 reairing, plans for a second season had already been previously scrapped.

== Episodes ==
No.	Title	Directed by	Written by	Original release date
1	"Search for the Starsword"	Gwen Wetzler	Tom Ruegger	September 12, 1981
Note: This was the first episode to air, though it was the second episode produced. It was, however, the first scripted episode.
2	"City of the Ancient Ones"	Gwen Wetzler	Michael Reaves	September 19, 1981
3	"The Lord of Time"	Unknown	Marc Scott Zicree	September 26, 1981
4	"The Mermaid of Serpent Sea"	Unknown	Tom Ruegger	October 3, 1981
5	"The Quest"	Unknown	Story by : Martin Pasko; Teleplay by : Robby London	October 10, 1981
6	"Spacewrecked"	Unknown	Tom Ruegger	October 17, 1981
7	"Lightning City of the Clouds"	Unknown	Tom Ruegger	October 24, 1981
8	"Kingdom of Neptul"	Unknown	Michael Reaves	October 31, 1981
9	"Tree of Evil"	Unknown	Michael Reaves	November 7, 1981
10	"The Air Whales of Anchar"	Unknown	Marc Scott Zicree, Michael Reaves	November 14, 1981
11	"The Overlord's Big Spell"	Unknown	Marc Scott Zicree	November 21, 1981
12	"The Crown of the Sorceress"	Unknown	Marc Scott Zicree	November 28, 1981
13	"The Zombie Masters"	Unknown	Marc Scott Zicree, Michael Reaves	December 5, 1981

== Home video release ==
Various episodes were released on VHS through the 1980s by several VHS distribution companies worldwide such as: Sunset Video in France, F.H.E. Home Video and UAV Corp. in the United States, Aurora Video in Spain, Select Video and Egmont Film in Finland and Norway.

In mid-January 2006, BCI Eclipse Entertainment acquired the rights for the series.

BCI Eclipse LLC, under its Ink & Paint classic animation entertainment label, and under license from Entertainment Rights PLC, released Blackstar: The Complete Series on DVD in Region 1 on August 22, 2006. The two-disc set features all 13 original, uncut episodes of the series in story continuity order, fully restored and re-mastered for optimum audio and video quality, plus several bonus features.

On August 5, 2008, episodes were released on a DVD named Heroes and Heroines, with episodes from many series.

By early 2009, this release had been discontinued and is out of print as BCI Eclipse ceased operations.

In 2007, three PAL DVDs containing two episodes on each were released by Boulevard Entertainment in the UK, though no subsequent DVDs have been released, leaving the remaining seven episodes unreleased, as Boulevard Entertainment went into liquidation in 2014.

== Merchandise ==
=== Toys ===
Galoob produced action figures from 1983 to 1985 after the show's cancellation, attempting to tap into the He-Man boom. The first series was re-released alongside the second and third series of figures with "laser light" stone-sparking action.

While Blackstar, Klone (with his Cloud Cat disguise) and Mara were the good guy action figures, Overlord, Vizier, a Lava Loc, a Palace Guard, Kadray (which listed him as a "Wizard King") and Neptul were the bad guy action figures alongside the villains Gargo (a vampire man), Meuton (a wasp man), Tongo (a leopard man) and White Knight (a warrior of Overlord), who did not appear in the cartoon series.

Evil characters were packaged with demons while good characters were packaged with Trobbits. Trobbits were also packaged individually with Rif, Terra and Gossamer being the scarcer ones to find.

Warlock the dragon and the Space Ship were each released in two color variations. Also released were Kadray's flying bull Triton, the Trobbit Wind Machine and the Battle Wagon. The Ice Castle was constructed with very thin plastic, making it very fragile.

In Greece, Blackstar action figures (the "laser lights" with stone-sparkling action version) were released under the name "Κυρίαρχοι του Σύμπαντος" (Masters of the Universe) by ElGreco toy company, until they were eventually phased out by the introduction of He-Man and the Masters of the Universe.

=== Comics ===
Two independent comic adaptations were made for the French market. One was a three-episode series by artist Christian Gatignol (a.k.a. "Gaty") published by Éditions Vaillant in their long-running comic magazine Pif Gadget. The other was a 46-page one-shot published by Éditions LUG (then the publishing house translating the bulk of Marvel Comics in French) by artist Jean-Yves Mitton, the creator of famed French superhero Mikros. While Gatignol's version stays close to the original, Mitton went his own way with the Blackstar mythos, creating new enemies for Blackstar to fight (Antrax the coal giant, Telekrane the phantom witch), and stating that Blackstar and Mara had a romantic relationship. While Katana does not appear, she has a counterpart in Blackstar's original girlfriend from Earth, Leia, who appears in a flashback. It is also explained that Blackstar suffers partial amnesia from his crash on Sagar and had all but forgotten Leia when he started his relationship with Mara.

== See also ==
- Thundarr the Barbarian (1980)
