= Joseph Hellegouarc'h =

Joseph Hellegouarc'h (22 May 1920 – 1 May 2004) was a French scholar (1963), professor of Latin language and literature at Charles de Gaulle University – Lille III, then Paris-Sorbonne University.

He left an impressive scientific work, oriented towards the study of political vocabulary, metric, stylistic studies and literature.

== Publications ==
He completed the publication and translation of Latin authors in the series "Universités de France" by éditions des Belles Lettres:

- Tacitus, Histoires, in collaboration with Henri Le Bonniec and Pierre Wuilleumier
- Tacitus, Annales, in collaboration with Henri Le Bonniec and Pierre Wuilleumier
- Eutropius, Abrégé d'histoire romaine
- Velleius Paterculus, Histoire romaine
- Sallust, La Conjuration de Catilina, La Guerre de Jugurtha Fragments des Histoires
- Horace, Odes et Épodes
