= Heyrieux =

- Commune
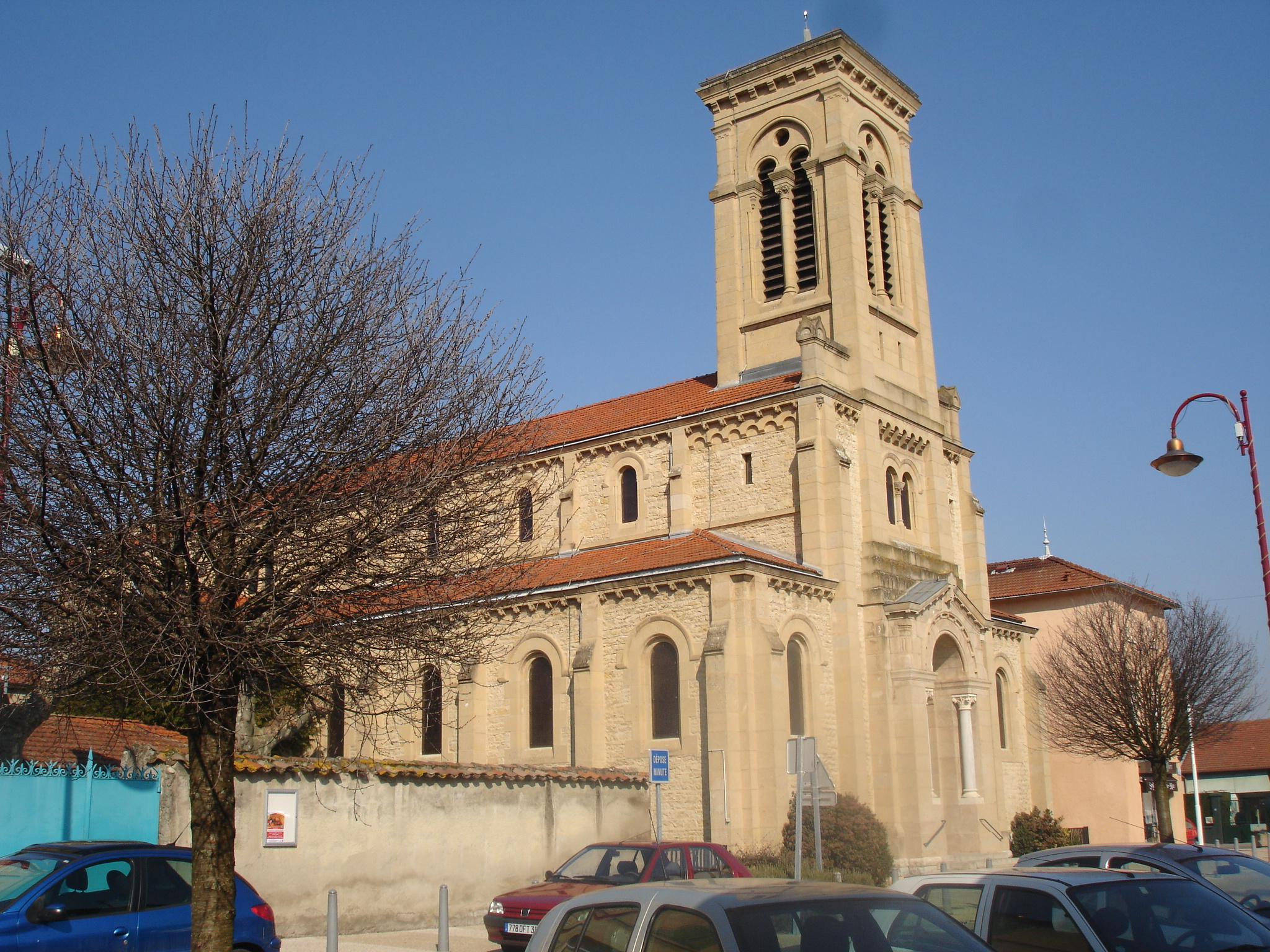
- The church of Heyrieux

- Coat of arms
- Location of Heyrieux
- Location within France Location within Auvergne-Rhône-Alpes
- Coordinates: 45°37′48″N 5°03′50″E
- Country: France
- Region: Auvergne-Rhône-Alpes
- Department: Isère
- Arrondissement: Vienne
- Canton: La Verpillière
- Intercommunality: Collines Isère Nord Communauté

Government
  - Mayor (2020–2026): Daniel Angonin
- Area^{1}: 13.95 km^{2} (5.39 sq mi)
- Elevation: 208 m (682 ft)
- Highest elevation: 381 m (1,250 ft)
- Lowest elevation: 259 m (850 ft)
- Population (2023): 4,956
  - Density: 355.3/km^{2} (920.1/sq mi)
- Time zone: UTC+01:00 (CET)
  - Summer (DST): UTC+02:00 (CEST)
- INSEE/Postal code: 38189 /38540
- ^{1} French Land Register data, which excludes lakes, ponds, glaciers > 1 km^{2} (0.386 sq mi or 247 acres) and river estuaries.

Heyrieux (French pronunciation: [ɛʁjø]) is a commune in the Isère department in southeastern France.

== Toponymy ==
As with many polysyllabic Arpitan toponyms or anthroponyms, the final -x marks oxytonic stress (on the last syllable), whereas the final -z indicates paroxytonic stress (on the penultimate syllable) and should not be pronounced, although in French it is often mispronounced due to hypercorrection.

== Population ==
Historical population

Year	Pop.	±% p.a.
1793	1,232	—
1800	1,338	+1.19%
1806	1,427	+1.08%
1821	1,539	+0.50%
1831	1,424	−0.77%
1836	1,490	+0.91%
1841	1,520	+0.40%
1846	1,560	+0.52%
1851	1,416	−1.92%
1856	1,362	−0.77%
1861	1,369	+0.10%
1866	1,355	−0.21%
1872	1,465	+1.31%
1876	1,535	+1.17%
1881	1,541	+0.08%
1886	1,517	−0.31%
1891	1,508	−0.12%
1896	1,510	+0.03%
1901	1,505	−0.07%

Year	Pop.	±% p.a.
1906	1,508	+0.04%
1911	1,446	−0.84%
1921	1,101	−2.69%
1926	1,116	+0.27%
1931	1,205	+1.55%
1936	1,223	+0.30%
1946	1,273	+0.40%
1954	1,346	+0.70%
1962	1,475	+1.15%
1968	1,733	+2.72%
1975	2,473	+5.21%
1982	3,270	+4.07%
1990	3,872	+2.13%
1999	4,163	+0.81%
2007	4,646	+1.38%
2012	4,674	+0.12%
2017	4,731	+0.24%
2023	4,956	+0.78%

Source: EHESS and INSEE (1968-2023)

== Twin towns ==
Heyrieux is twinned with:

- Busnago, Italy, since 1999

== See also ==
- Communes of the Isère department
