= Jean-Yves Mitton =

French comic artist

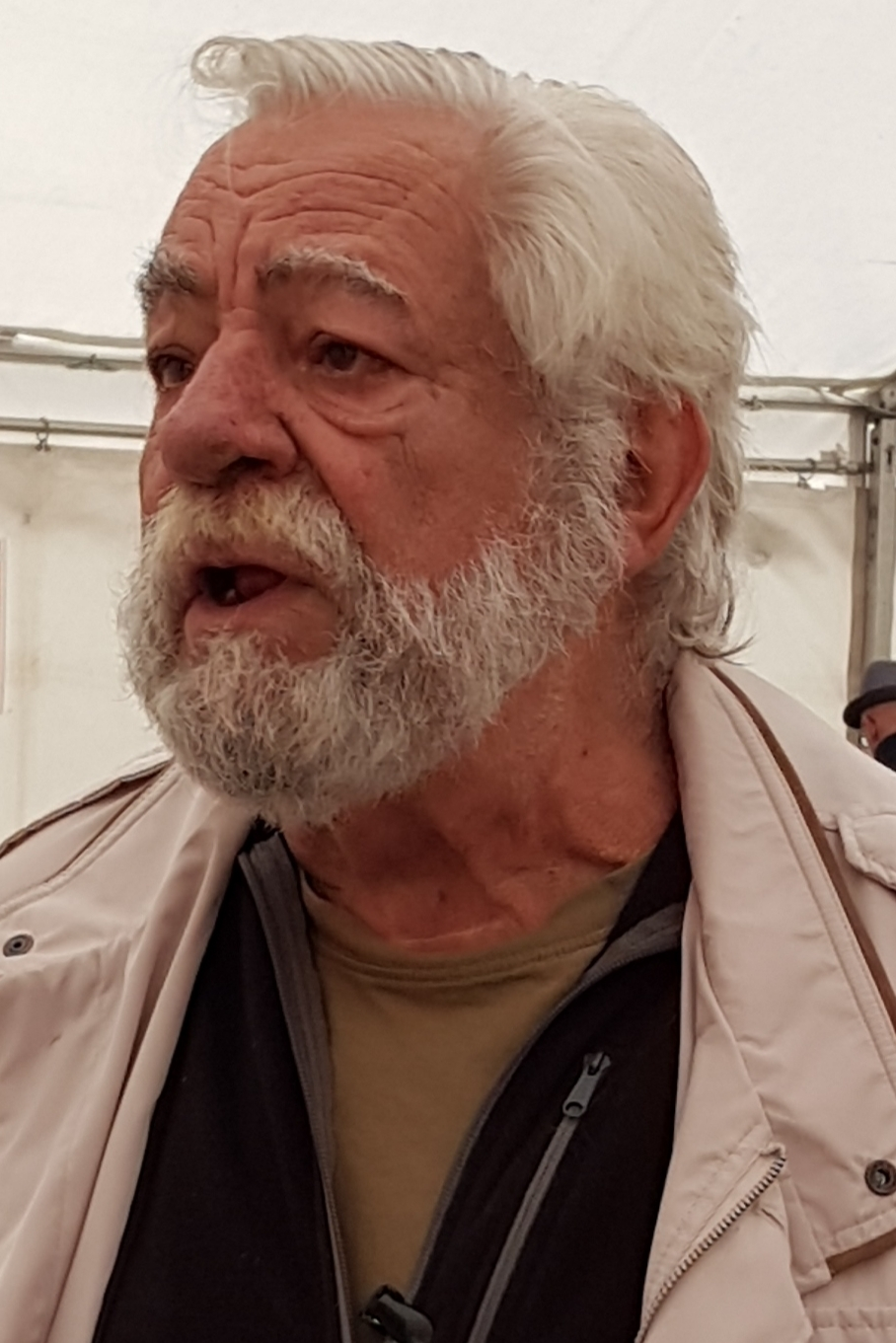
Mitton in 2018

Jean-Yves Mitton (born 11 March 1945) is a French cartoon artist. He is notable for working on the Mikros series of comics, published by éditions Lug in the 1980s.

== Life ==
=== Early life ===
He was born in Toulouse and moved to Lyon in 1959, joining the Beaux-Arts after a curtailed time at school. He joined the Ateliers des éditions Lug, where he started out by retouching foreign cartoons to conform to the demands of France's censorship commission.

He then created the first cartoons of his own, adapting comic works like Popoff or Pim Pam Poum and realist ones like Blek le Roc, for which he drew 22 episodes, as well as producing several covers.

=== Career ===
In 1980, Jean-Yes Mitton produced two episodes of Surfer d'argent with Marcel Navarro.

In 1981, under the pseudonym 'John Milton' in reference to the 17th century English poet of that name, he created the superhero Mikros in the Mustang digest. Mikros then moved to Titans when Mustang changed format. For Lug, he also created sci-fi series - Epsilon, Kronos and Cosmo. He also produced episodes for Photonik, created by his Lug colleague Ciro Tota.

When Lug was bought by Semic, the latter stopped producing original comics and solely focussed on translating American stories. Mitton then moved to work for other publishers. In 1987, with François Corteggiani, he produced L'Archer blanc for Le Journal de Mickey, then Noël et Marie for Pif Gadget. His collaboration with Corteggiani also allowed him to move away from magazines and digests to explore publishing in albums - in 1990 he took over creating the art for the De silence et de sang series at éditions Glénat. In 1990 he also published a scifi comic album as Demain... les Monstres for Semic.

He then collaborated with éditions Soleil :

- 1991 - 2006 - the Vae victis ! series for texts by Simon Rocca, in fifteen albums ;
- 1992 - 2003 - art and text for three albums in the Les survivants de l'Atlantique series, then just the text for the remaining six albums (with art by Félix Molinari ;
- 1994 - 2000 - art and text for the Chroniques Barbares series.

From 1997 to 2008, for éditions Glénat, he produced art and text for the seven-volume Quetzalcoatl and from 1998 to 2003 the text for the six-album Attila mon amour series.

In 2011 he produced Kzara ou les nuits barbares, his first Hard X erotic album, published by éditions Ange.

== Works ==
=== Digests ===
- Blek le Roc
- Mikros

=== Blek le Roc series ===
1. « Nuage d'or » (Nuvole d'oro) KIWI 239 – 03/1975 - written by Maurizio Torelli
2. « Blek le Roc contre les fils du dragon noir » KIWI 241/242 – 05-06/1975 - written by Marcel Navarro
3. « La diligence perdue » KIWI 245/246 – 09-10/1975 - text by Marcel Navarro -
4. « Blek à Londres » KIWI 253/254 – 05-06/1976 - text by Marcel Navarro
5. « Pas mème une bête... » KIWI 258/259 – 10-11/1976 - text by Marcel Navarro
6. « Blek est mort ! » KIWI 262 – 02/1977 - text by Navarro & Mitton
7. « Magic land » KIWI n. 264 – 04/1977 text by Marcel Navarro e Jean-Yves Mitton
8. « Saratoga » Kiwi n. 266 – 06/1977 - text by Navarro & Mitton
9. « Le dictateur » Kiwi n. 269 – 09/1977 - text by Navarro & Mitton
10. « Mort dans un écrin vert ! » Kiwi n. 272 – 12/1977 - text by Navarro & Mitton
11. « Independence day 4th july » 1776 Kiwi n. 275 – 03/1977 - text by Navarro & Mitton
12. « Les origines de Blek » Kiwi n. 278/279 – 06-07/1978 text by Navarro & Mitton
13. « La Vulcana éternelle » Kiwi n. 283 – 11/1978 - text by Navarro
14. « Les mystères de Boston » Kiwi n. 286 – 02/1979 - text by Navarro
15. « Le sceau des damné » Kiwi n. 290 – 06/1979 - text by Navarro
16. « Bienvenue, monsieur l'ambassadeur ! » Kiwi n. 294 – 10/1979 - text by Navarro
17. « Pour une poignée de sterling ! » Kiwi n. 296 – 12/1979 - text by Navarro
18. « Les origines d'Occultis » Kiwi n. 300 – 04/1980 - text by Navarro
19. « Sur la piste des Wanakis » Kiwi n. 307 – 11/1980 - text by Navarro
20. « À l'amour comme à la guerre ! » Kiwi n. 313 – 05/1981 - text by Navarro
21. « La nuit la plus longue » Kiwi n. 358 – 02/1985 - text by Mitton
22. « Big Georges » Kiwi n. 400 – 08/1988 - text by Mitton

=== Albums ===
- Oum le dauphin blanc, written by Marcel Navarro and Maurizio Torelli, LUG, 19 issues, 1972–1973.
- Histoire de l'Arménie, text by André Pelletier, Fra. Nor. Seround, 1980.
- Blackstar, LUG, 1985.
- Noël et Marie, text by Jean Ollivier and François Corteggiani, Messidor/La farandole, 1989. :
1. Deux enfants dans la Révolution Française (1788/1789).
2. La Patrie en danger (1789/1792).
3. Valmy 1792.
- De silence et de sang, text by François Corteggiani, Glénat, 'Vécu' collection :
  - 4. Les Vêpres siciliennes, 1990.
  - 5. Les 7 piliers du chaos, 1991.
  - 6. Omerta, 1992.
  - 7. La Dixième arcane majeure, 1993.
  - 8. Les 4 provinces de l'Ave Maria, 1994.
  - 9. Je n'étais même pas là..., 1995.
  - 10. Dans le courant sans fin, 1996.
  - 11. Le Sceau de Caïn - partie 1, 1998.
  - 12. Le Sceau de Caïn - partie 2, 1999.
  - 13. Le Système Jurado, 2001.
  - 14. Chi non muore si revede, 2004.
- Demain ... les monstres, Semic, 1990 (republished by Soleil, 1994).
- Vae victis !, text by Simon Rocca, Soleil:
1. Ambre, le banquet de Crassus, 1991.
2. Cloduar, je me nomme Légion, 1992.
3. Garak, le voleur de Torques, 1992.
4. Milon, le charmeur d'orages, 1993.
5. Didus, le retour de l'infâme, 1994.
6. Boadicae, la guerrière folle, 1995.
7. Yorc, le bateleur, 1996.
8. Sligo, l'usurpateur, 1998.
9. Caïus Julius Caesar, le conquérant, 1998.
10. Arulf, l'Inénien, 1999.
11. Celtill, le Vercingétorix, 2000.
12. Adua, une louve hurle dans Avaricum, 2001.
13. Titus Labienus, le stratège, 2002.
14. Critovax, au-delà de l'ignominie, 2004.
15. Ambre à Alésia - 'Cursum Perficio', 2006.
- Gilgamesh, drawings by Franck Zimmermann, Soleil, 1996.
- Les survivants de l'Atlantique, drawings by Félix Molinari from volume 4 onwards, Soleil :
1. Le Secret de Kermadec, 1992.
2. La route des esclaves, 1993.
3. L'île de la liberté, 1993.
4. Trésor mortel, 1997.
5. Tempête sur Trafalgar, 1997.
6. La belle, le diable et le corsaire, 199.
7. Louisiane, l'enfer au paradis, 2001.
8. Un océan de larmes et de sang, 2002.
9. Dernier naufrage, 2003.
- Chroniques Barbares, Soleil :
1. La Fureur des Vikings, 1994.
2. La Loi des Vikings, 1995.
3. L'Odyssée des Vikings, 1995.
4. Le Retour des Vikings, 1998.
5. Au nom des Vikings, 1999.
6. Le Dernier Viking, 2000.
- Quetzalcóatl, Glénat, 'Vécu' collection :
1. Deux fleurs de maïs, 1997.
2. La Montagne de sang, 1998.
3. Les Cauchemars de Moctezuma, 1998.
4. Le Dieu des Caraïbes, 2000.
5. La Putain et le conquistador, 2003.
6. La Noche triste, 2005.
7. Le Secret de la Malinche, 2008.
- Les Faiseurs de nuées, drawings by Jean-Marc Stalner, E.R.C Boulon, 1998.
- L'Archer blanc, text by François Corteggiani, Soleil :
1. Le retour de l'archer, 1998.
2. L'Arc magique, 1998.
- Mikros (revival of his character, originally created for éditions LUG) :
1. Mikros, Sang d'encre, 1998.
2. Quelque part une étoile ..., Sang d'encre, 1998.
3. Kaos, politiquement incorrect, text by Reed Man, Organic Comix, 2007.
- Attila ... mon amour, drawings by Franck Bonnet, Glénat, 'Vécu' collection :
1. Lupa la louve, 1998.
2. Les Portes de l'Enfer, 1999.
3. Le Maître du Danube, 2000.
4. Le Fléau de Dieu, 2001.
5. Terres brûlées, 2002.
6. Voir Rome... et mourir, 2003.
- Les Truculentes aventures de Rabelais, drawings by Michel Rodrigue, Hors collection :
1. Salade de spadassins à la Léonard, 2001.
2. Fricassée de fripouilles à la Gargantua, 2002.
- Papoose, drawings by Franck Chantelouve :
1. Teepi en folie, Jet Stream, 2002.
2. Papoose Circus, MPF, 2006.
- Colorado, drawings by Georges Ramaïoli, Daric :
1. Navaja, 2007 (1st edition at Carpe Diem, 2003).
2. Chaparro, 2006.
3. Big black banjo, 2008.
4. Wong Lee, 2010.
5. Miss Maureen, 2012.
- Le Dernier Kamikaze, drawings by Félix Molinari, Soleil :
1. Objectif Okinawa, 2006.
2. Les Fantômes du pacifique, 2007.
3. Au nom de l'Empire du Soleil levant, 2009.
- Ben Hur, Delcourt :
1. Livre premier : Messala, 2008.
2. Livre Deuxième - Quintus Arrius, 2009.
3. Livre Troisième : Cheik Ilderim, 2010.
4. Livre Quatrième - Golgotha, 2010.
- 'Sexy Bulles' collection, Ange, 2011-2016 :
  - Kzara ou les nuits barbares, 2011
  - Messalina, 2011-2016 :
    - Le temple de Priape, 2011.
    - Le sexe et le glaive, 2012.
    - La putain de Rome, 2012
    - Des orgies et des jeux, 2013.
    - Le palais des supplices, 2015.
    - Dernier orgasme, 2016.

== Bibliography (in French) ==
- Jean-Louis Cartillier and Thierry Martinet (text), François Corteggiani (preface), Jean-Yves Mitton (illustrations), Entretiens avec Jean-Yves Mitton, Mediacom, 1999, ISBN 2970020408
- François Xavier Burdeyron, « Interview de Jean-Yves Mitton », Ekllipse, Semic, no 8, March 2001, p. 29-36
- Patrick Gaumer (2010). "Mitton, Jean-Yves". Dictionnaire mondial de la BD (in French). Paris: Larousse. p. 600-601. ISBN 9782035843319..
- Christophe Quillien (October 2018). "Noël et Marie". Pif Gadget : 50 ans d'humour, d'aventure et de BD. Hors Collection. p. 218-219. ISBN 9782258152601..
