= Pierre Wuilleumier =

French archaeologist and professor

- Born: 1 January 1904; Paris
- Died: 20 November 1979 (aged 75)
- Occupations: Archaeologist; Professor

Pierre Wuilleumier (1 January 1904 – 20 November 1979) was a 20th-century French scholar, normalian, professor of Latin language and literature at the Sorbonne and archaeologist.

== Biography ==
Pierre Wuilleumier held the chair of National Antiquities in Lyon from 1933. In 1940, he was responsible for the excavations of the ancient Theatre of Fourvière on the hill of Fourvière with Amable Audin. From 1941 to 1954, he directed two constituencies of Historic Antiquities in the Lyon region. He contributed to the magazine Gallia since its creation in 1942, in which he regularly published the results of excavations on the hill of Fourvière and the Lyon region.

In 1947, he led the excavations of the so-called Cybel sanctuary in Lyon.

== Publications ==
=== Publication and translation of Latin authors ===
He completed the publication and translation of Latin authors in the "Collection des Universités de France" by the éditions des Belles Lettres

- Cicero, Cato Maior de Senectute
- Tacitus, Histoires, in collaboration with Henri Le Bonniec and Joseph Hellegouarc'h
- Tacite, Annales, in collaboration with Henri Le Bonniec and Joseph Hellegouarc'h

=== Archaeological publications ===
- 1939: Tarente, des origines à la conquête romaine, éd. De Boccard, Paris
- 1947: Le cloître de Saint-André-le-Bas à Vienne, in collaboration with J. Déniau, Jules Formigé, E.-L. Albrand, éditions Audin, Lyon, 55 p., 8 planches hors-texte
- 1951: Fouilles de Fourvière à Lyon, preface by Édouard Herriot, series Fouilles et monuments archéologiques en France métropolitaine, CNRS, 85 pages, 8 plans, 20 planches hors texte
- 1953: Lyon, métropole des Gaules, Belles Lettres, 118 p. Read online
- 1963: Inscriptions latines des Trois Gaules, CNRS, 256 pages, XVIIe supplément à la revue Gallia
- 1964: Laet Sigfried, minutes of reading published in L'antiquité classique, volume 33, fasc. 1. p. 292-293,
- 1964: Amable Audin, minutes of reading published in Revue belge de philologie et d'histoire, vol. 42, n° 1, p. 135-136.
