= Cegid =

French software company

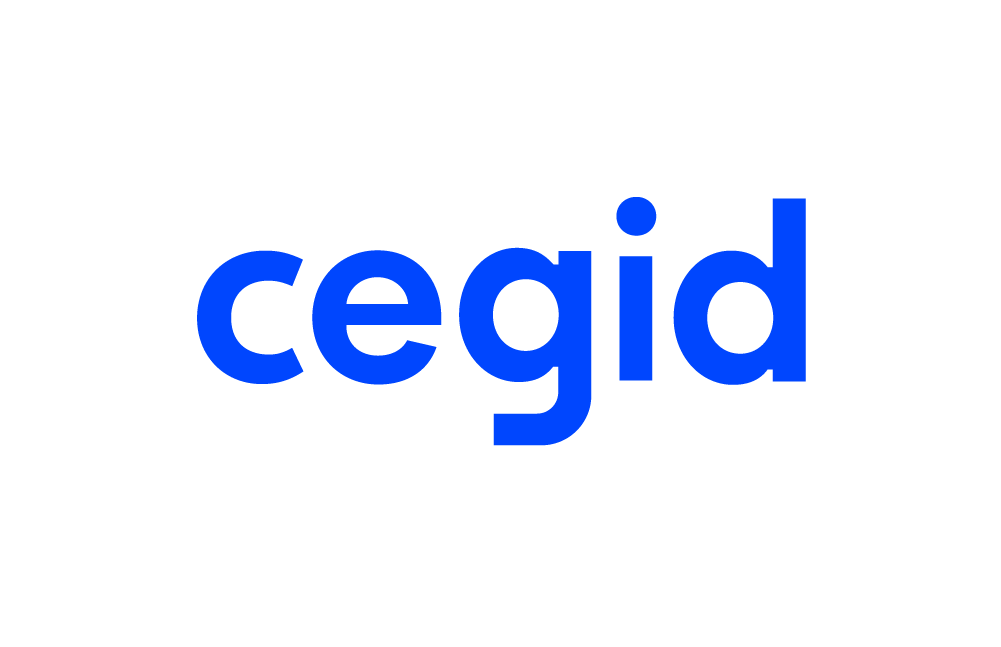
- Type: Private
- Industry: Software
- Founded: 1983
- Founder: Jean-Michel Aulas
- Headquarters: Lyon, France
- Key people: Christian Pedersen (CEO); Bruno Vaffier (General Manager); Christian Lucas (Chairman)
- Revenue: €1.069 billion (2025)
- Net income: 119,371,000 (2022)
- Owner: Silver Lake (majority)
- Number of employees: 5,000+ (2026)
- Website: cegid.com

Cegid is a French software company specializing in business management software, including enterprise resource planning (ERP), payroll, finance, tax, and retail management software. Established in 1983, Cegid has grown to become a leading provider of cloud-based business software in France and internationally.

== History ==
Cegid was founded in 1983 in Lyon, France, by Jean-Michel Aulas. The company initially focused on accounting software and later expanded into other business management software. Cegid was listed on the French stock market in 1986.

In 2004, Cegid acquired French software company CCMX, which provided accounting, payroll and business-management software. The transaction was challenged on competition grounds and temporarily suspended in 2005, before the Conseil d'État upheld its authorization in February 2006.

During the 2010s, Cegid increasingly shifted from traditional software licences to software as a service and cloud-based products. SaaS revenue reached €20 million in 2011, and by the first half of 2015 cloud services accounted for 61% of the company's software revenue.

In 2016, U.S. private equity firm Silver Lake acquired control of Cegid through a public bid. Cegid was subsequently taken private and its shares were delisted from Euronext Paris on 27 July 2017.

After being taken private, Cegid accelerated its expansion through acquisitions. In 2019, it acquired Meta4, a Spanish payroll and human-resources software company with operations in Spain, Portugal and Latin America. Two years later, it acquired the French cloud human-capital-management company Talentsoft.

Also in 2021, KKR acquired a minority stake in Cegid in a transaction that valued the company at €5.5 billion. Silver Lake remained the majority shareholder.

Cegid continued to build its European software business during 2024 and 2025. It acquired French accounting-software company EBP in 2024, followed in 2025 by PHC Business Software in Portugal, Microdata in Spain and sevdesk in Germany. The acquisition of sevdesk strengthened Cegid’s position in the DACH market for cloud-based accounting and invoicing software for small businesses.

In June 2026, Cegid completed its acquisition of Shine, a financial-management platform for small businesses and accountants.

== Operations ==
Cegid develops cloud-based business software for companies, accounting firms, retailers and small businesses. Its main areas of focus include accounting and financial management, enterprise resource planning (ERP), treasury and tax management, payroll and human resources, and retail software.

Cegid is based in France and has significant operations in Europe. The Iberian Peninsula is one of its largest regional markets, with Spain and Portugal accounting for around 20% of group revenue in 2025. The company has also expanded in the DACH region; its acquisition of sevdesk added an established provider of accounting and invoicing software focused on Germany and Austria.

Cegid's enterprise business also operates in markets including the Benelux countries, Northern Europe, Canada and Latin America. As of 2026, Cegid had more than 5,000 employees and sold its software in around 130 countries.
