= Archaeology (disambiguation) =

Archaeology is the study of ancient cultures through examination of the artifacts they left behind.

Archaeology may also refer to:

- Archaeology, an 1879 book by Alfred Percival Maudslay (part of Biologia Centrali-Americana)
- Archaeology (magazine)
- Archaeology (album), a 1996 album by The Rutles
- Archeology, a 2024 album by Moka Only and Soulful Playground

== See also ==
- The Archaeologist, a magazine
- The Archeologist, a 1914 silent film
