= Noviodunum =

Noviodunum is a name of Celtic origin, meaning "new fort": It comes from nowyo, Celtic for "new", and dun, the Celtic for "hillfort" or "fortified settlement", cognate of English town.

Several places were named Noviodunum. Among these:

- Noviodunum ad Istrum, city, large Roman fortress and naval base near what is now Isaccea, Romania
- Jublains, Mayenne, France, capital of the Aulerci Diablintes
- Neung-sur-Beuvron, Loir-et-Cher, as Noviodunum Biturigum; the capital of the Bituriges, where Vercingetorix fought Julius Caesar in 52 BC.
- Nevers, Nièvre, France
- Pommiers, Aisne, France (oppidum of the Suessiones, situated on the nearby heights of Soissons)
- Nyon, Vaud, Switzerland (formed the city centre of Julius Caesar's 45 BC foundation of Colonia Iulia Equestris)
