= André Pelletier (historian) =

French historian and archaeologist

André Pelletier (born 11 January 1937) is a French historian and archaeologist, a professor and specialist of ancient Rome.

== Biography ==
Agrégé of history, Doctor of Letters in 1972, he directed the excavations of Vienne for 15 years, the site to which he devoted his doctoral thesis. In 1963 and 1964, he uncovered Roman mosaics in the old hospital sector. He searched the Odeon from 1970 to 1976, in collaboration with P. Senay, and under his direction only from 1973. In 1974 then in 1982, he published two monographs summarizing current knowledge on ancient Vienne. He wrote the text of the album Histoire de l'Arménie, drawn by Jean-Yves Mitton and published in 1979.

He was maître de conférences of ancient history and Roman archaeology at the Lumière University Lyon 2 from 1984.

== Works ==
List of his publications:

- 1967: Vienne, métropole civile de province (275-468 ap. J.C.) : étude critique des sources, under the direction of Paul-Marie Duval
- 1972: Vienne antique : de la conquête romaine aux invasions alamaniques : IIe siècle avant - IIIe siècle après J.C., under the direction of Marcel Le Glay
- 1974: Vienne gallo-romaine au Bas-Empire : 275-468 après J.-C., Lyon, Impr. BOSC Frères
- 1980: Histoire de Vienne et de sa région et environs : Sainte-Colombe Saint-Romain-en-Gal, éditions Horvath, 126 p.
- 1988: In collaboration with André Blanc and Jean Prieur, Histoire et archéologie de la France ancienne, Rhône-Alpes, de l'âge de fer au Haut Moyen-âge, Le Coteau, éditions Horvath
- 2001: Vienna, Vienne, Presses universitaires de Lyon, 190 pages ISBN 2-7297-0677-1

He was director of the following historical summary works:

- Grande Encyclopédie de Lyon et des communes du Rhône, Roanne, Horvath, 1980-1983
- La Médecine en Gaule : villes d'eaux, sanctuaires des eaux, Paris, Picard, 1985
- Histoire de Lyon : des origines à nos jours, Le Coteau : Horvath, 1990
