= Amable Audin =

French archaeologist

Amable Audin (1899–1990) was a French archaeologist. He specialized in studying the Roman city of Lugdunum, known in modern times as Lyon, France.

== Biography ==
Born in Lyon on July 25, 1899, Audin had a passion for archeology from a young age. He took part in his first dig at 20 years old.

In 1952, he succeeded Pierre Wuilleumier in directing the dig at the Roman archeological site of Fourviere, and found several major monuments in the ancient Roman city of Lugdunum (Lyon) including the Odeon of Lyon, Cybel Sanctuary, and the Amphitheater of the Three Gauls. Audin also made multiple fortuitous discoveries in the districts of Vaise and the fifth arrondissement of Lyon. In some cases, his notes are the only documentation of sites later destroyed as the city grew. In 1956 he published La topographie de Lugdunum, which has been updated many times.

In 1968 he was the first to observed a section of a Roman rampart, which in 2012 was confirmed to be part of the Murus Gallicus of Lyon.

As the conservator of many Gallo-Roman artifacts from Lyon, he convinced the mayor Louis Pradel to construct a museum to house them. The Gallo-Roman Museum of Lyon-Fourvière (known today as the Lugdunum Museum) opened in 1975 with Audin as its first conservator.

He was a member of The Academy of Sciences, Humanities and Arts of Lyon.

He died in Lyon on January 25, 1990.
