= Taurobolic Altar (Lyon) =

Ancient Roman altar in Lyon, France

Coordinates: 45.7604°N 4.8199°E

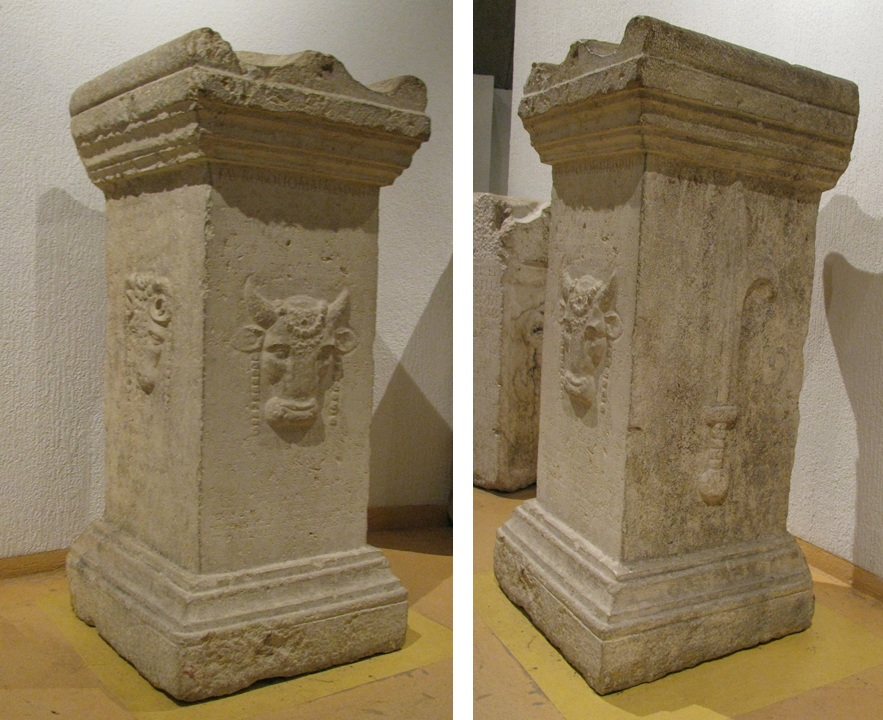
Taurobolic Altar

The Taurobolic Altar (French: Autel taurobolique) is an inscribed ancient Roman altar found in 1704 in a vineyard belonging to a certain Bourgeat on the Fourvière hill in Lyon, France. It dates to the year AD 160 and refers to a taurobolium carried out in Lugdunum to Cybele for the restoration of the emperor Antoninus Pius's health. It is now held at the Gallo-Roman Museum of Lyon.
