= Lyon-Vaise Hoard =

3rd century ancient Roman hoard of precious objects

The Lyon-Vaise Hoard (French: Trésor de Lyon-Vaise) is a 3rd-century ancient Roman hoard of precious objects, found in Lyon (Roman Lugdunum) in 1992 and now on display in the Gallo-Roman Museum of Lyon. It includes dishes, jewellery, statuettes and coins. It was buried for fear of Germanic raids and the coins in it allow its burial to be dated to after AD 258 (perhaps during the 259 raid).

Some pieces are displayed in the Gallo-Roman Museum of Lyon:

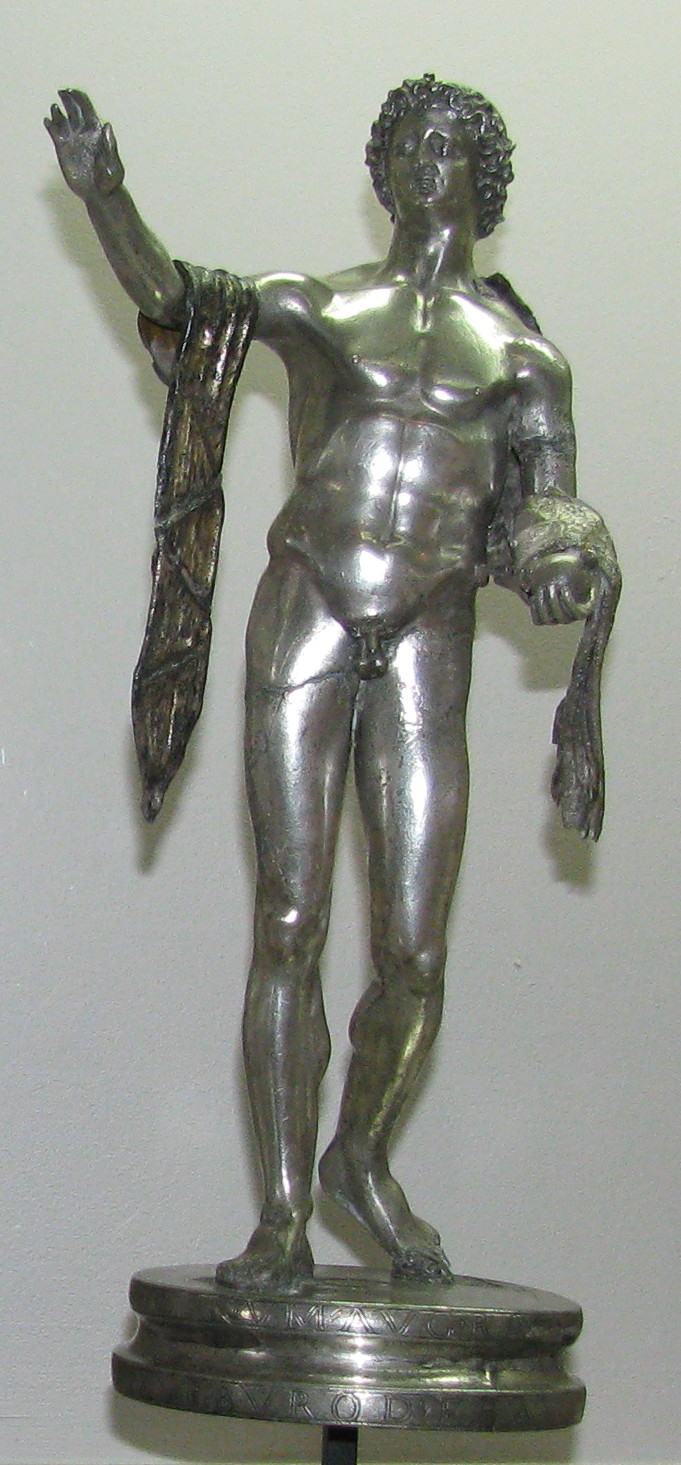
Apollo's silver statue

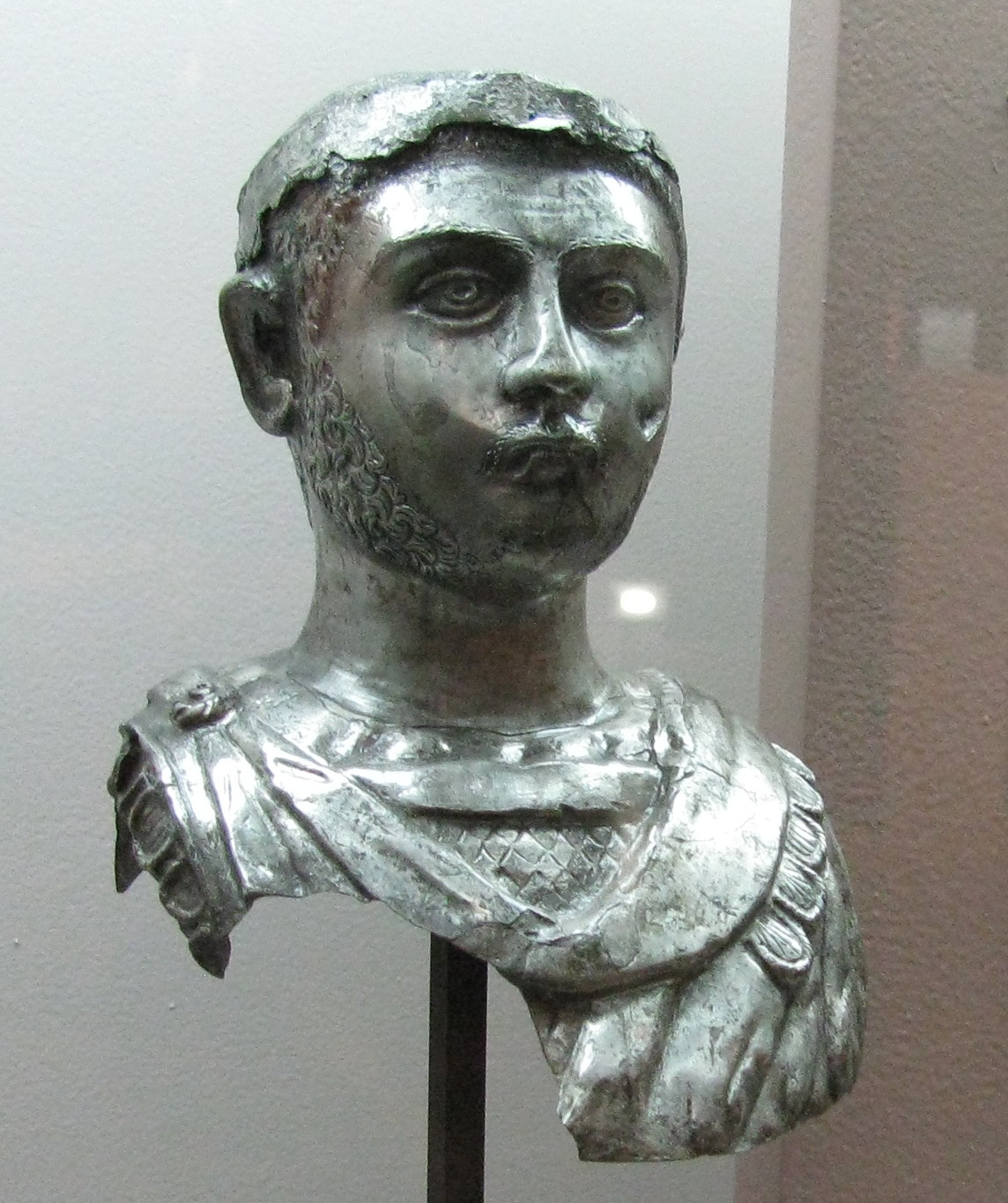
Unknown young man head wearing a scale breastplate

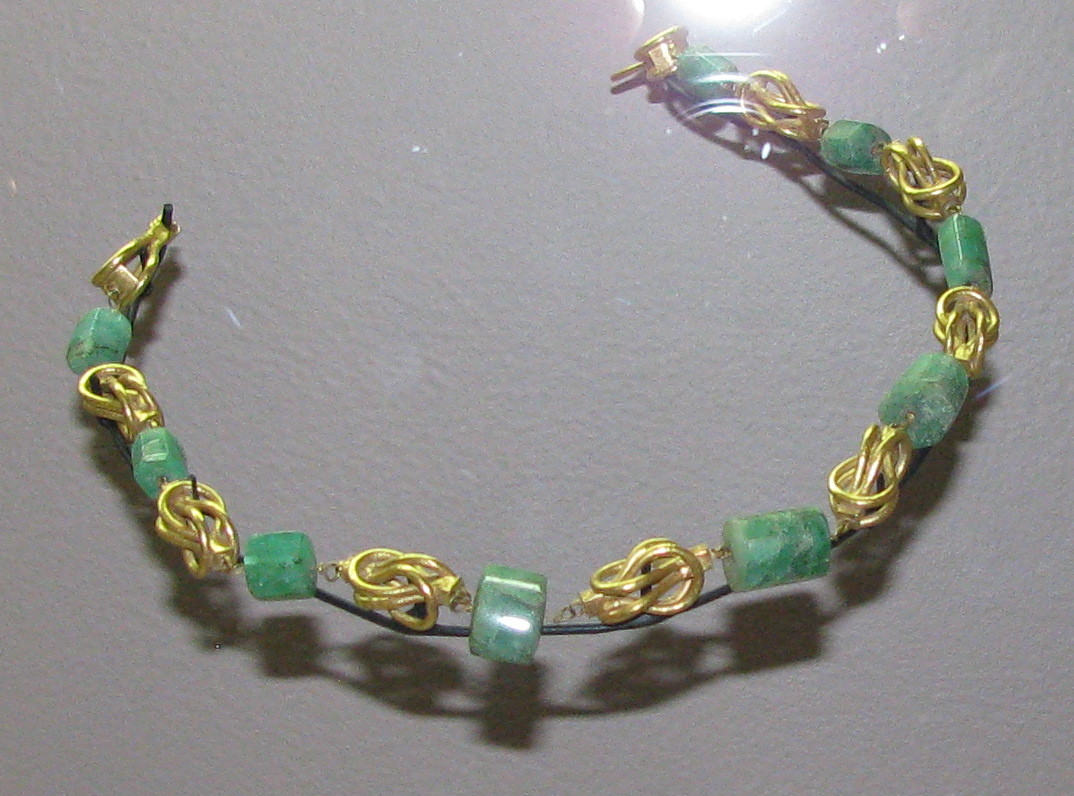
Collar; emerald stones and gold nodes

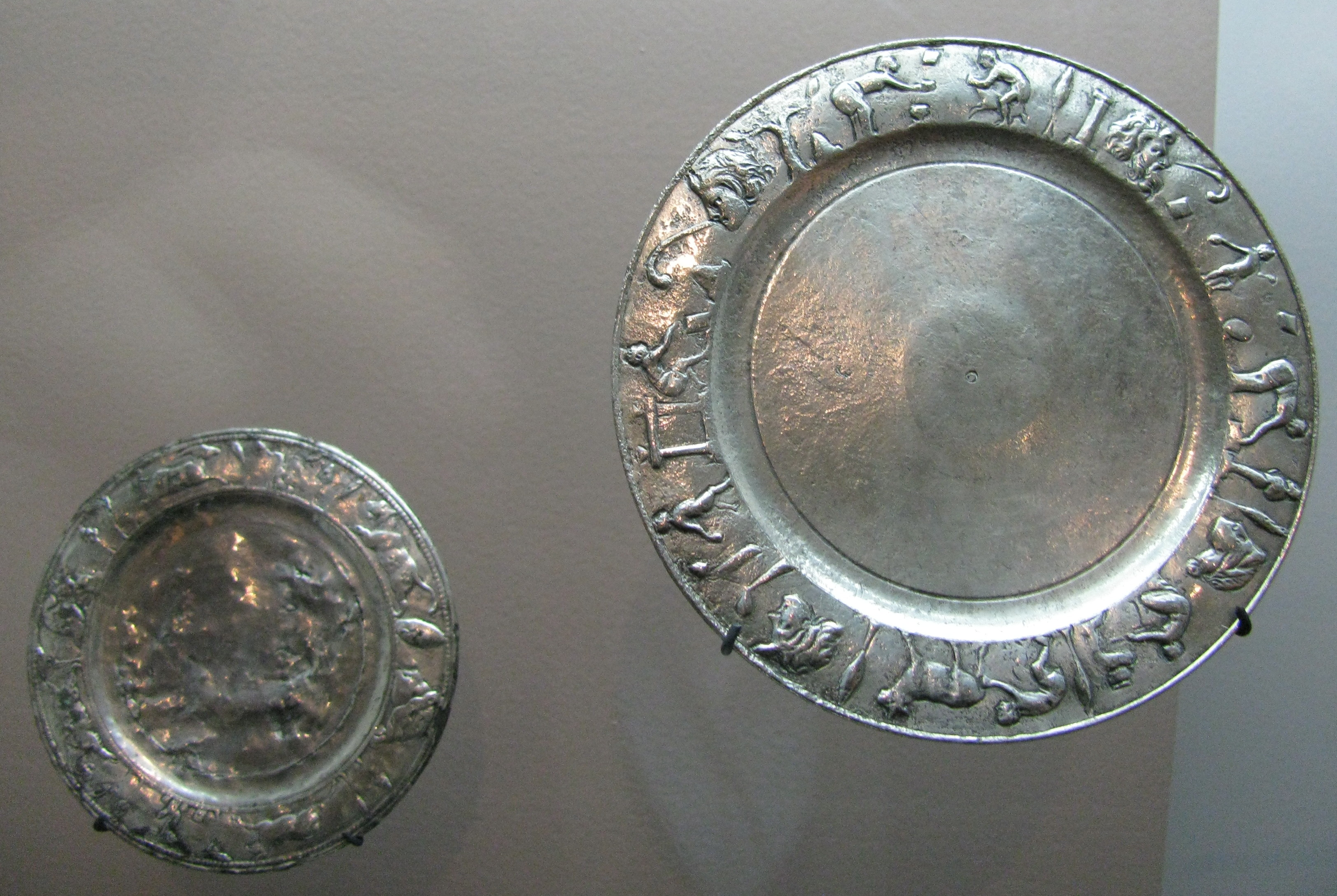
Small silver plates
