= Circus Games Mosaic =

2nd-century Roman mosaic

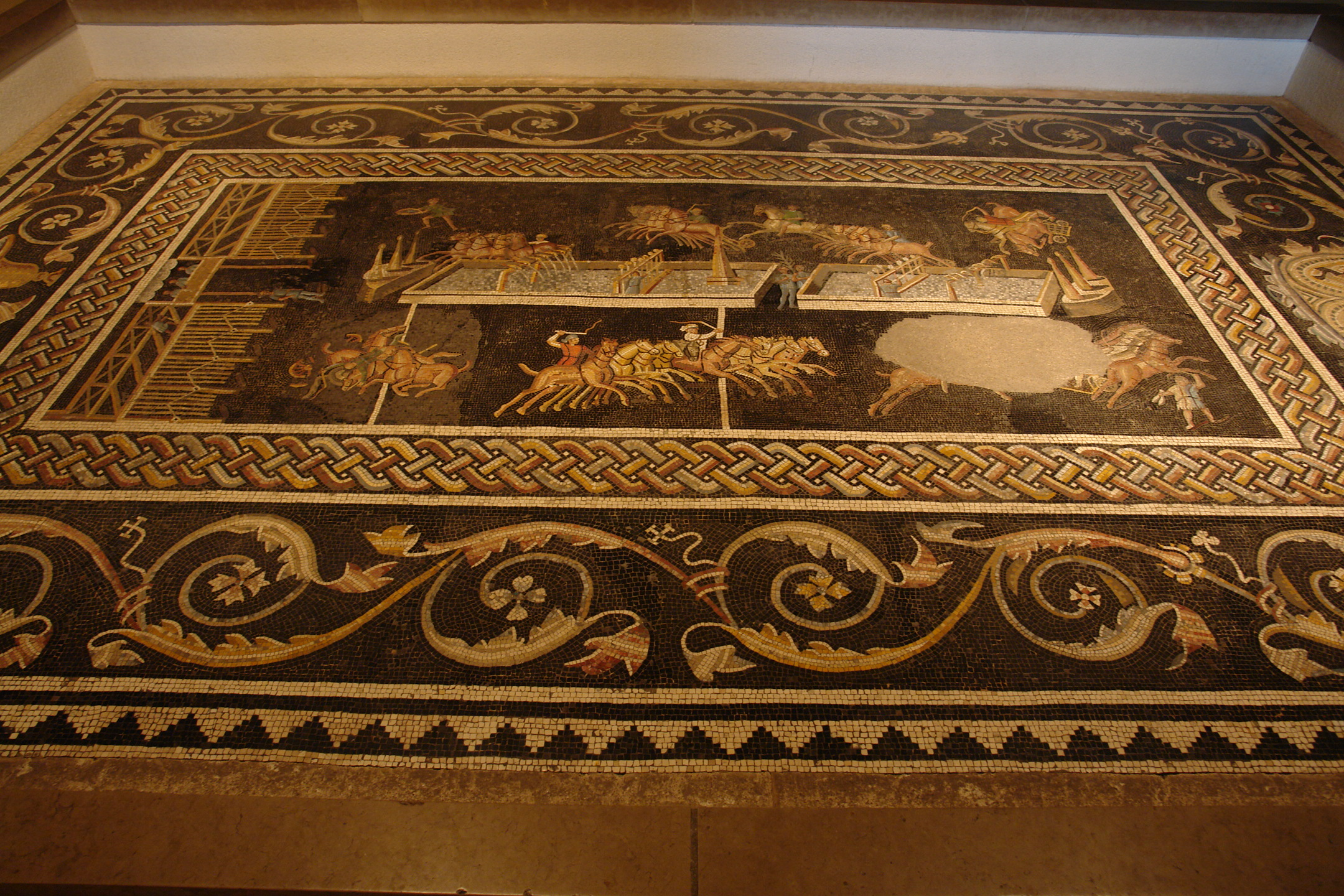
The Circus Games Mosaic in the Gallo-Roman Museum of Lyon

The Circus Games Mosaic (French: La mosaïque des jeux du cirque), also known as "Mosaic Macors", is a 2nd-century CE Roman floor mosaic depicting the various stages of a chariot race between quadrigae, chariots drawn by four horses. It was discovered in 1806 in Lyon (Roman Lugdunum), and after a number of relocations since its discovery is now on display in the Gallo-Roman Museum of Lyon.

== Discovery ==
The Circus Games Mosaic was discovered on 18 February 1806 on the land of pharmacist Paul Macors in the district of Fourviere, Lyon – hence its alternative name "Mosaic Macors" – and was one of a number of mosaics found in that and other Lyon districts between 1806 and 1809. According to the chroniclers of the time, the actual location where it was unearthed by workers digging a dam could have been at any one of three close-by places in the district of Fourviere: the south-east corner of Rue Victor Hugo and Rue Jarente; 24 Rue Jarente; or 39 Rue Victor Hugo. Buried under a meter of topsoil, there were no other ruins to index it chronologically, and reddish gravel that covered the mosaic suggested it had been covered to protect it. Even so, the Greek-style borders of the mosaic intended to increase its apparent size were very degraded, and so Paul Macors, conscious of the value of the find, built a small Doric temple above the mosaic in order to protect it.

== The Mosaic's owners ==
Since its discovery in 1806 by Paul Macors, the Circus Games Mosaic has had a number of owners and been moved three times: in 1818, 1863, and 1975.

Initially, from 5 June to 20 June 1806, curious viewers could visit the mosaic in M. Macors' garden for a small fee that went to pay the original diggers who uncovered it. On 26 June 1806, probably during the construction of M. Macors' temple, teachers and students were invited to observe both the mosaic and the garden in which it was found, but it is unknown whether public viewing of the mosaic was possible after June 1806. M. Macors later stated that the mosaic would be made more visible from 1 November 1808 to 1 May 1809, but in the meantime, in new excavations in his garden, he discovered another mosaic named "Meleager" and decided to create "Circle Garden Mosaics", an attraction housing both mosaics in a way that curious visitors could not only cultivate their knowledge but also be offered rest and entertainment no different from neighboring breweries.

Circle Garden Mosaics lasted only a year from 1 July 1, 1809 to 30 June 30, 1810, and the death of Paul Macors on 12 March 1811 precipitated the sale of his land and the mosaics on it. The Lyon City Council deliberated on the subject on 29 May 1811 and decided to create a commission to determine how the city could acquire the mosaics. The report fixed the purchase price of the Circus Games Mosaic at 5000 francs and advised buying the adjoining land. But the Council decided to postpone its decision at its meeting of 20 April 1812, and events moved on without the Council. M. Macors field was divided into two – north and south – with the southern portion housing the temple which covered the mosaic. At an auction on 18 September 1812 the fields were awarded to Vincent Depierre and his son Charles, who resided in Rue Sainte-Catherine. The new owners offered to on-sell their purchase to the City Council and the then-prefect Monsieur le Comte de Bondy suggested the mayor include 6,000 francs in the 1813 budget for the acquisition of the mosaic so that the city could retain it. However, the City was too late once again. On 10 August 1813 the Depierres sold the mosaic to two architects, Jacques and Victor Ruffaut Rivoiron, for 4,900 francs.

The Rivoirons destroyed the temple and decided to transfer the mosaic to Paris, not taking into account the wishes of the mayor of Lyon, M. Albon. Under the law of 18 Brumaire Year III on the protection of monuments, he made an order prohibiting the removal of either mosaic. The City then agreed to pay the architects 4,900 francs for the Circus Games Mosaic to which it added a further 2,100 francs as reimbursement of expenses and allowances, agreeing to move the mosaic within three months as it was still where it was discovered, on land now owned by the Depierres. This 1813 purchase ultimately cost the City 7,535 francs, including moving costs of 1,818 francs and the costs of having a shed built over the mosaic to protect it.

But the mosaic was still to undergo further machinations. The Depierres filled the excavation ditches to protect the mosaic from moisture and decided to close the field in which it was located. These actions were reported to the mayor on 16 April 1814 by the French archaeologist and later director of the Museum of Fine Arts of Lyon Francois Artaud (see French Wikipedia), and the next day the mayor wrote to the Depierres requiring removal of the mosaic. The Depierres seemed to comply, but in 1815 they reoffended by molesting the guardian appointed by the mayor to monitor the field, and complaining that they were unable to divide their field into streets in order to sell building lots. On 26 July 1817 the Depierres threatened to continue the sub-dividing work they had already commenced, which would result in the destruction of the mosaic. The prefect then made an order prohibiting the Depierres from continuing their work and forcing them to surrender the land in order for the City of Lyon to move the mosaic.

It is unknown what delayed the subsequent movement of the mosaic, although a possible cause was the technical difficulties of such a transfer. Francois Artaud gives no explanation other than bad political circumstances. One known technique at that time for moving a mosaic could only be used if the cement was healthy, which seemed not to be the case with the Circus Games Mosaic since it had been damaged by moisture. It was not until Francesco Bellono, the director of the Imperial School of Mosaics in Paris invented a method to move the tiles of a mosaic that the Circus Games could be moved using the Bellono process, to be followed by the mosaic "Cassaire" and the so-called "Michoud". The Mayor of Lyon, Comte de Fargues, learned that such a method existed and was able to tell the City Council that M. Bellono had agreed to come to Lyon to transport the mosaic to the Palais St-Pierre in the Museum of Fine Arts of Lyon for the sum of 6,000 francs.

The Parisian mosaic expert arrived in Lyon in early October 1818 and the work of moving the mosaic took place from 8 October to 3 November, with Bellono inviting the Company Widow Souplet to supply a competent person to check the mosaic before the removal commenced. This was done, and after eight months of restoration by Bellono's workshop, the mosaic was finally documented in December 1819 and January 1820 as residing on the floor of the Hall of Antiques in the Museum of Fine Arts of Lyon, a room at the south-east corner of the museum. The museum's inventory of 1833 listed the mosaic as still in the Hall of Antiques, and in 1835 director Artaud noted that the total cost of restoration and relocation of the mosaic had eventually reached about 23,000 francs, far from the 6,000 francs that the council had agreed to in 1817.

During the expansion of the museum on the current Rue Édouard-Herriot in 1863, the mosaic was moved to the Room for Antique Casts, on the first floor of the east wing. On 20 March 1870, the prefect of Lyon decided to entrust a new restoration of the mosaic (as well as another mosaic named "Children's Games") to the father and son team of Mora Mosaic. After restoration the Circus Games Mosaic then joined the "Mosaic Cucherat" in the Room of Antique Casts where the latter mosaic had been on display since 1845. In 1921, during the drafting of the Revue du Lyonnais, the Circus Games Mosaic was still listed as being in the same room at the Museum of Fine Arts of Lyon in Fouviere.

In 1975, the mosaic was moved into the current museum, the Gallo-Roman Museum of Lyon.

== Description ==
As detailed above, the Circus Games Mosaic has been moved three times to date and during these processes elements of it were restored, leading to some variation in descriptions of it. Francois Artaud published three almost identical descriptions of the mosaic in two monographs in 1806 and a book in 1835. His folio of 1806 contains a colored gravure illustration of the entire mosaic, and a further three images of details of the mosaic are in his 1835 book. (A reproduction of Artaud's original color gravure can be found in Capucine Lemaitre's paper.) Several reproductions of the Lyon mosaics appeared in subsequent publications such as The History of the Romans by Victor Duruy and Gallia by Camille Jullian, but only Artaud's illustration represents the mosaic as it was found in 1806, without the restorations carried out by Bellono in 1818 and the Moras in 1870. The description that follows is based on the Artaud gravure illustration of the unrestored mosaic.

The mosaic is roughly rectangular, and Francois Artaud gave its dimensions before excavation as 5.035 metres by 3.086 metres. The conservator of the Archaeological Museum of Lyon, Ambroise Comarmond (see French Wikipedia), later measured it as 4.97 metres by 3 metres, very close to its modern dimensions, perhaps indicating a slight change in size during restoration.

The mosaic is primarily black, with polychrome decoration. Starting from the outside, it is framed by a border of white and black triangular "teeth", then a black border three stones wide, followed by a white border two stones wide. Then comes a broad band of foliage incorporating a cup on the left hand side and a largish plant on the right, connected by a chain of foliage consisting of leaves containing four-petalled flowers. Inside this is a further large white border three stones wide, followed by a large continuous braid in two indistinct colours, and a final white border three stones wide. Inside this complex of borders is a depiction of the central arena of a Roman circus, but without any stands. This image of Lugdunum's circus without stands is in accord with inscriptions from the time referring to the college of centurions financing the reconstruction of the circus after its wooden benches were burned.

On the left side of the circus is the porta pompae or ceremonial gate, topped by a viewing box holding three judges of whom the central one holds the mappa, the white cloth dropped into the stadium to signify the start of the race. On each side of the porta pompae are a row of four carceres, i.e. holding pens with starting gates (the word literally means "prisons" in Latin), in which the competing chariot teams wait to be released at the drop of the mappa. The fact that there are four carceres on each side of the main gate enables the mosaic to be speculatively dated as preceding the reign of Emperor Domitian, when six carceres per side came into use. The porta pompae is flanked by two pillars, one of which disappears altogether in a missing part of the mosaic which also partly occludes a character wearing a red cap and blue breeches, who may be a referee.

The Circus Games Mosaic is remarkable in several respects (including the presence of three judges in the viewing box), but its most intriguing aspect is the absence of the altars and other small temples that usually adorn the spina ("spine"), the massive central masonry edifice around which the chariots race. Almost as long as the arena is wide, the spina here is uncharacteristically divided into two rectangular pools. The left pool features a tall obelisk, as well as a set of pillars topped by an architrave and bearing seven dolphins spouting water. Both pools also have another set of pillars and architrave bearing seven oval balls, one of which is lowered for every lap completed by the competitors. Two characters holding the winner's laurels stand between the two pools and other staff line the track: a sparsor ("spreader") holds a full bowl of water and is responsible for watering the track, horses, and chariot wheels in case of overheating; an agitator ("driver") holds a whip in one hand, likely to excite the horses, and a set of shears in the other, perhaps to cut the reins of the horses in case of accident; and a lone rider straddles two horses running on the outside of the competitors, and is perhaps a steward. Meanwhile, the competing chariots and their teams of four horses are shown in various positions around the track as they circle the spina.

== Bibliography ==
- F. Artaud, Histoire abrégée de la peinture en mosaïque, suivie de la description des mosaïques du Midi de la France, in 8, Description de la mosaïque de M. Macors, Grande monographie de 1806.
- Revue du Lyonnais, octobre-décembre 1921, pp. 453 – 504.
- Anne-Catherine Le Mer, Claire Chomer, Carte archéologique de la Gaule, Lyon 69/2, Paris, 2007, 883 pages.
