= Lugdunum (museum) =

Museum in Lyon, France

Coordinates: 45°45′38″N 4°49′12″E

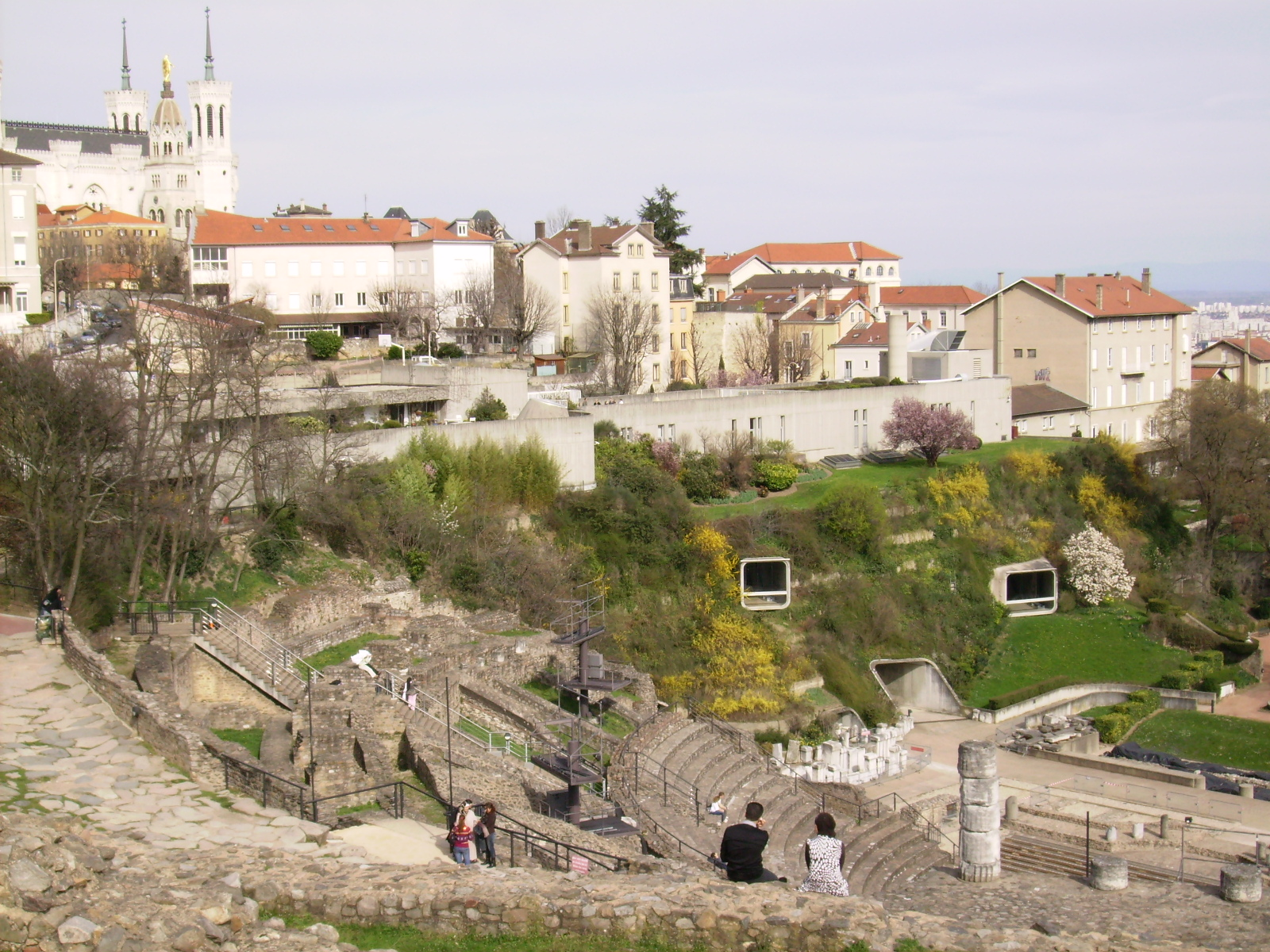
The museum seen from the Roman theatre

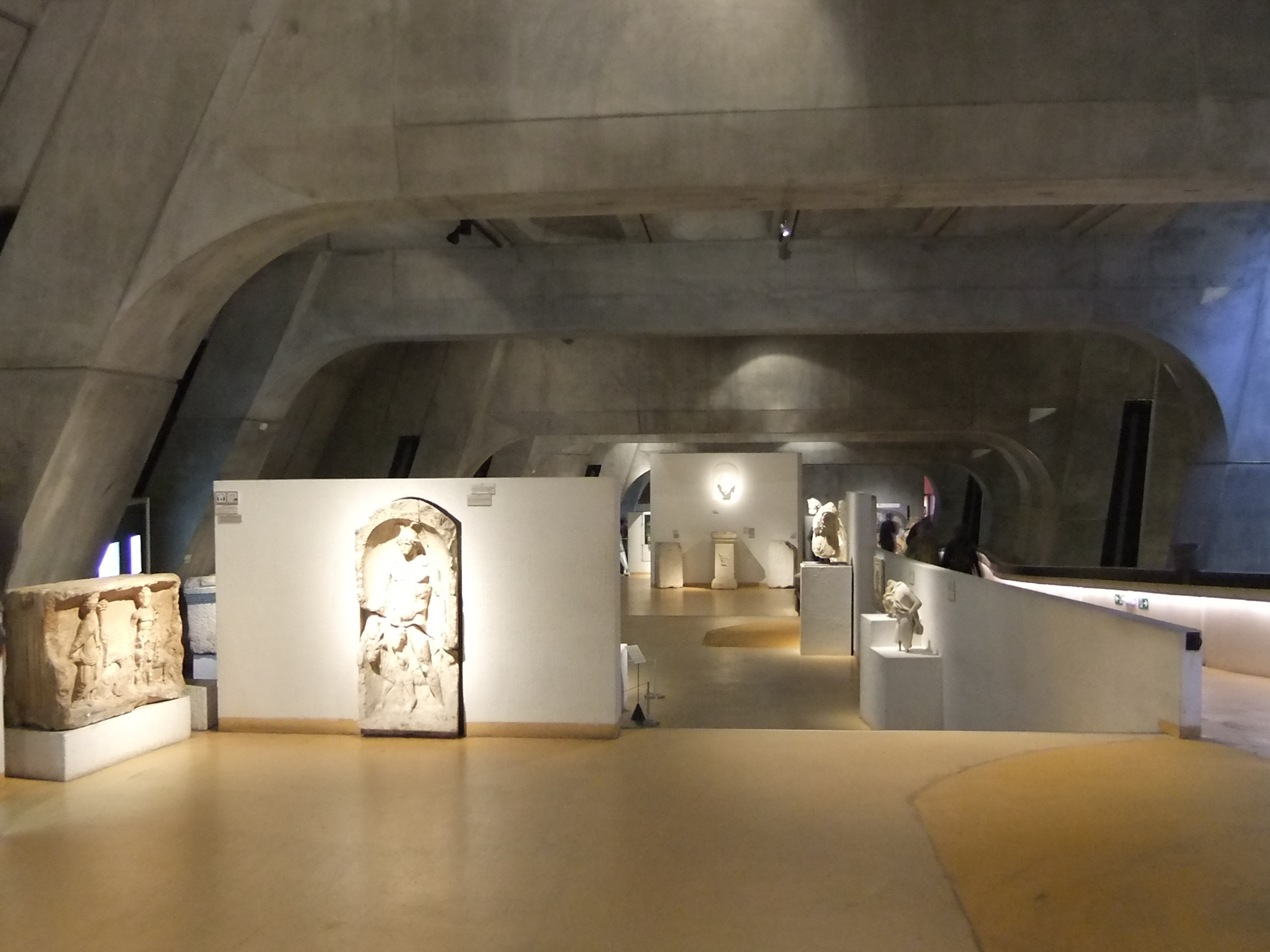
Interior of the museum

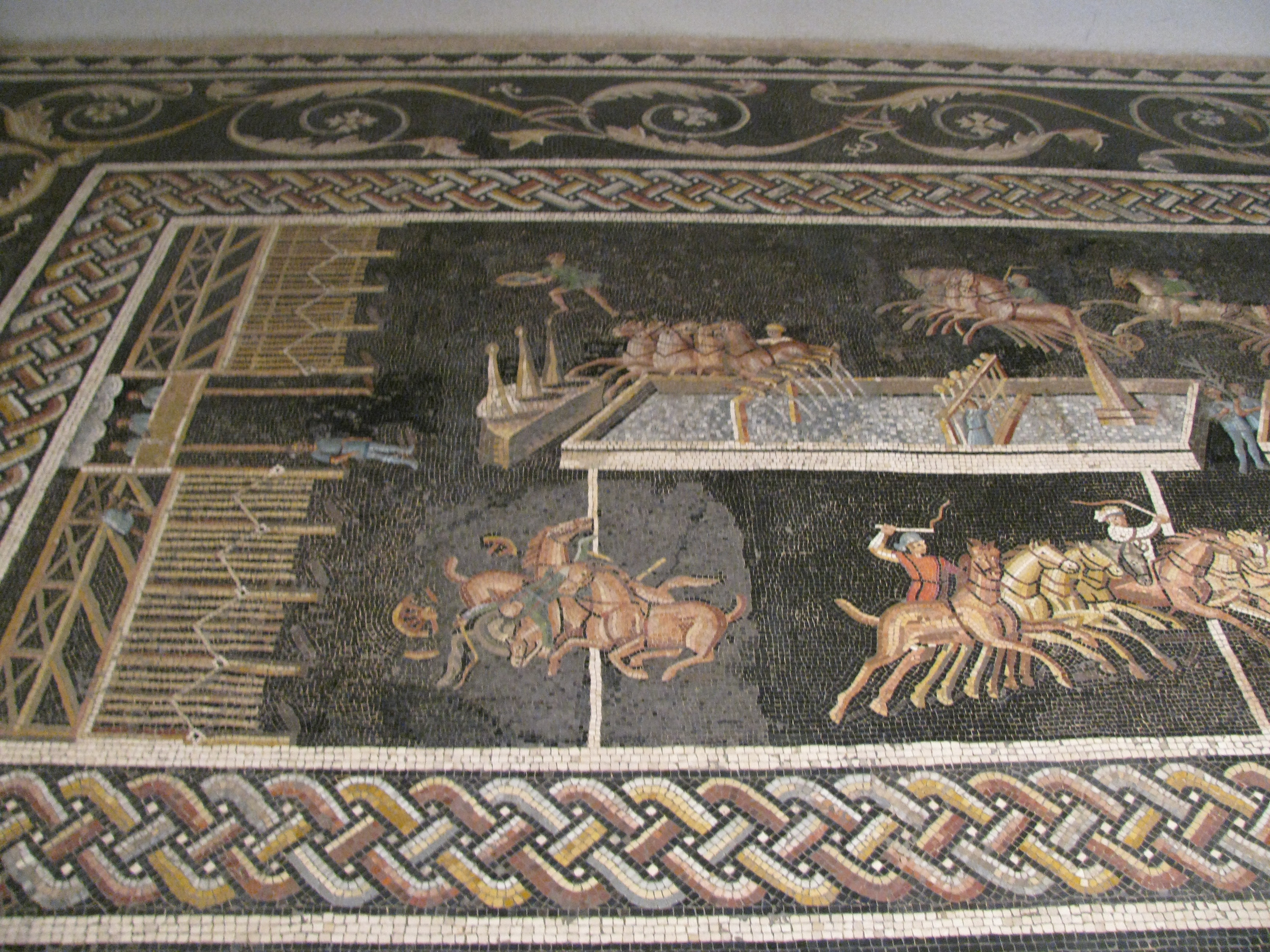
Circus Games Mosaic, 2nd century

Lugdunum, formerly known as the Gallo-Roman Museum of Lyon-Fourvière (French: musée gallo-romain de Fourvière) or Museum of Roman Civilisation (musée de la Civilisation romaine), is a museum of Gallo-Roman civilisation in Lyon (Roman Lugdunum). Previously presented at the Museum of Fine Arts of Lyon and the Antiquarium, the municipal Gallo-Roman collection was transferred to a new building designed by Bernard Zehrfuss and opened in 1975, near the city's Roman theatre and odeon, on a hill known as Fourvière, located in the heart of the Roman city.

Internally, it is formed of a concrete spiral ramp descending and branching out into the display rooms. It is managed and operated by the Metropolis of Lyon jointly with the archaeological museum of Saint-Romain-en-Gal. As well as displaying its own permanent collections of Roman, Celtic and pre-Roman material (inscriptions, statues, jewellery, everyday objects), a plan-relief of the ancient town and scale models of its major monuments such as the theatre and the Odeon, it also regularly hosts temporary exhibitions. On November 8, 2017, the museum was renamed Lugdunum.

== Circus Mosaic ==
Discovered in the Ainay district in 1806, this mosaic shows a circus during a chariot race, making it one of the few ancient representations of such a race (Lyon itself had a circus, the place of which has not been discovered).

== Other objects ==
- the Gallic Coligny calendar
- the silver Lyon cup, decorated with images of Gallic gods
- fragments of the decoration of the Altar of Rome and Augustus, from the federal sanctuary of the three Gauls
- the Lyon Tablet, with a speech by Claudius
- large mosaics such as the Mosaïque de Bacchus and Mosaïque aux Svastikas
- the Taurobolic Altar, dedicated in 160 to restore the health of Antoninus Pius
- many large Dionysiac sarcophagi, including the Sarcophagus of the Triumph of Bacchus and Acceptii' sarcophagus
- the Lyon-Vaise Hoard of dishes, jewellery and silver statuettes buried during a 3rd-century Germanic invasion
- Neptune of Lyon - a 2nd-century statue made locally in Lugdunum, the largest bronze statue of Neptune found in France
