= Lyon Tablet =

Bronze tablet with part of a speech by Roman emperor Claudius

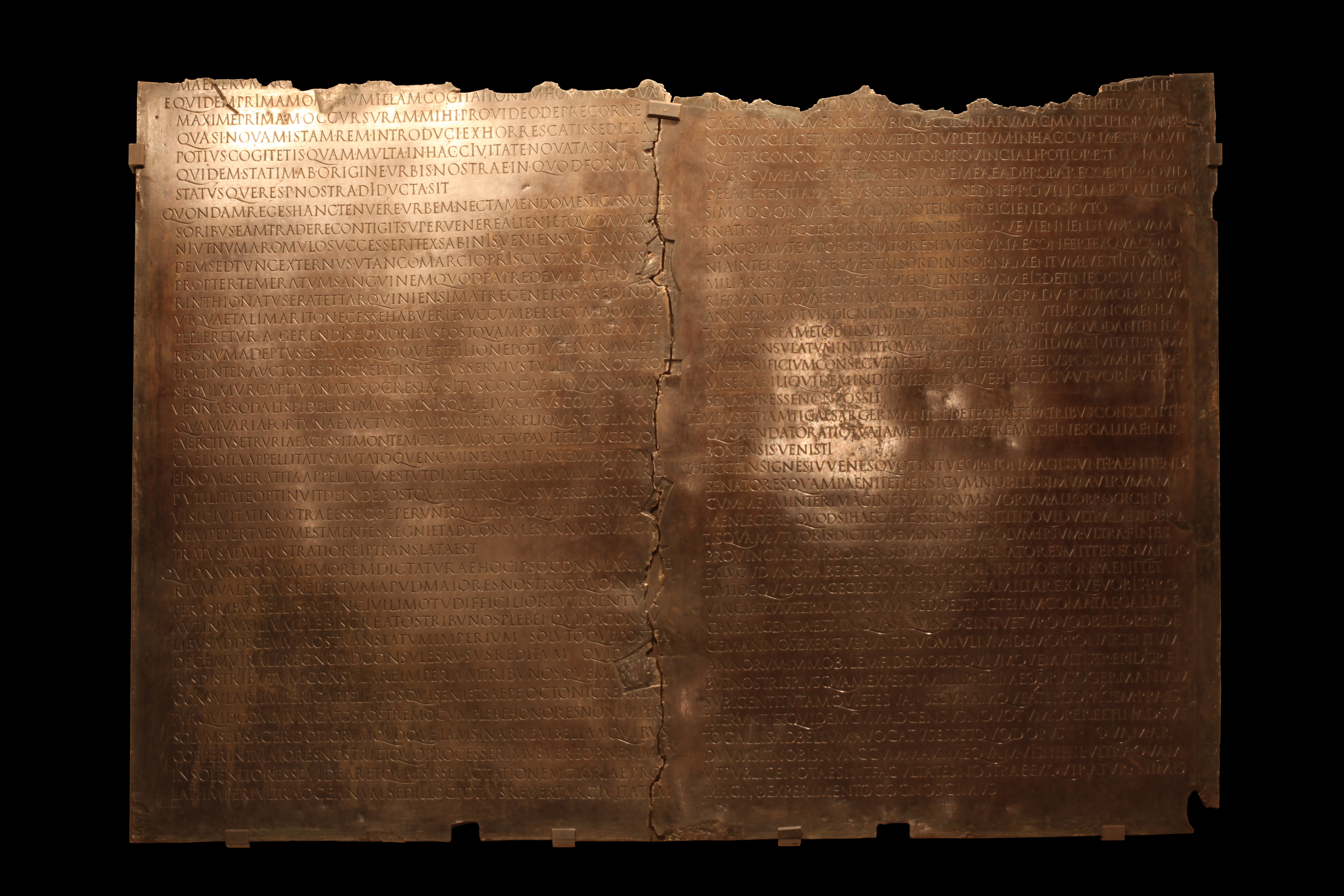
Lyon Tablet, in Gallo-Roman museum, Lyon

The Lyon Tablet is an ancient bronze tablet that bears the transcript of a speech given by the Roman emperor Claudius. The surviving bottom portion of the tablet was discovered in 1528 by a draper in his vineyard on Croix-Rousse Hill (on the site of the Sanctuary of the Three Gauls) in Lyon, France. It currently resides in the Gallo-Roman Museum of Lyon, now renamed Lugdunum.

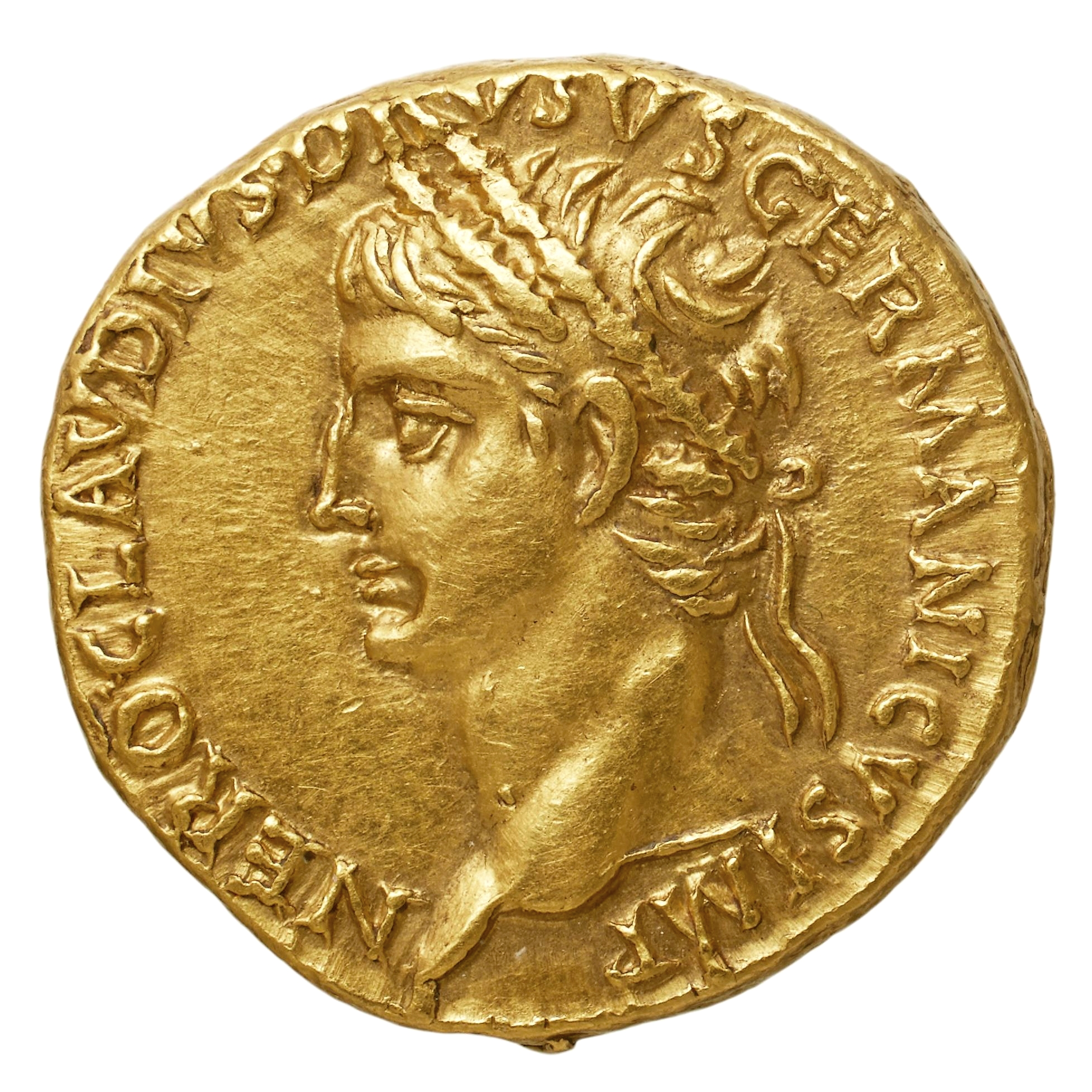
Claudius on a gold aureus minted in Lugdunum in AD 41 or 42

Claudius had particular affinities with Lugdunum (Lyon). He was born there, and it housed the Imperial cult centre: as both Emperor and a "native" of the city, he was probably seen as its patron. He made the inscribed speech before the Roman Senate in 48 AD. It was a proposal to allow monied, landed citizens from further Gaul to enter the Senatorial class, and thus the Senate itself, once they had reached the necessary level of wealth. His argument evoked the Sabine origins of his own family, the gens Claudia, and the recent promotion to senatorial rank of men from Gallia Narbonensis.

The text gives important insight into both the character of Claudius and Senate-emperor relations. Claudius goes into a long-winded digression on the early history of Rome – one which shows the effect of his tutelage under the historian Livy. This kind of pedantry is characteristic of Claudius and immediately identifies him as the speaker. Several interjections by senators are also recorded, mostly urging Claudius to get to the point. The style and substance of the speech suggest that Claudius was willing to publish himself as a scholarly, pedantic, tolerant upholder of ancient senatorial rights and values, eager to extend the same privileges to worthy provincials. The speech also contains references to other events during Claudius' reign, such as the fall of Valerius Asiaticus, whom Claudius singles out for condemnation. In his Annals, the later historian Tacitus reports a different version of the speech, probably based on various sources – including senatorial records – coupled with his own observations and the analysis of hindsight. His text broadly reaches the same conclusions but otherwise differs considerably from the version presented in the Lyon tablet, which includes many circumstantial details and may have been a verbatim transcript from an original Senate document.

The proposal was carried by the Senate. The elite of Lugdunum may have had the tablet made to celebrate their new status and as a demonstration of their gratitude. Claudius is known to have visited the city in 43 AD and in 47 AD.

== Tablet translation ==
- 1st column :

″Of course, I can foresee the objection which will arise in everyone's mind, will be the first to be raised against me... But do not rebel against the proposal I am making, and do not regard it as a dangerous novelty. Look instead at how many changes have taken place in this city, and how, from the origin, the forms of our Republic have varied.″

″In principle, kings governed this city, but they did not pass on power to successors from their own family; others came from outside, some of them foreigners. So Romulus was succeeded by Numa from the land of the Sabines, our neighbour no doubt, but a stranger to us at the time. In the same way, Ancus Marcius was succeeded by Tarquin the Elder who, because of the stain of his blood (his father was Demaratus of Corinth, and his mother a Tarquinian of noble race, it is true, but her poverty had forced her to submit to such a husband), found himself rejected in his homeland from the career of honours; after emigrating to Rome, he became its king. The son of the slave Ocresia, if we are to believe our historians, Servius Tullius took his place on the throne between this prince and his son or grandson, authors vary on this point. If we follow the Tuscans, he was the companion of Cælius Vibenna, whose fate he always shared. Driven out by the vicissitudes of fortune with the remnants of Caelius' army, Servius left Etruria and came to occupy Caelian Hill, to which he gave this name in memory of his former leader; he himself changed his name, in Etruscan he was called Mastarna and took the name I have already pronounced, Servius Tullius, and he obtained the kingship for the greater good of the Republic. Later, the morals of Tarquin and his sons having made them odious to everyone, the monarchical government bored the spirits, and the administration of the Republic passed to consuls, annual magistrates.″

″Shall I now recall the dictatorship, superior in power to the consular dignity, and to which our ancestors had recourse in the difficult circumstances brought on by our civil disturbance or dangerous wars, or the plebeian tribunes, instituted to relax the interests of the people? When power passed from the consuls to the decemvirs, did it not return to the consuls when it was taken away from the decemvirate? Was not consular power passed on to six, then eight military tribunes? Shall I tell of the honours, not only of command, but also of the priesthood, later communicated to the people? If I were to recount the wars waged by our ancestors, which made us what we are today, I would be afraid of appearing too arrogant and of taking vanity in the glory of our empire, which stretched as far as the ocean; but I would prefer to return to this city...″

- 2nd column :

″Undoubtedly, by a new custom, the divine Augustus, my great-uncle, and Tiberius Caesar, my uncle, wanted all the flower of the coloniae and the municipium, in other words the best and richest men, to be admitted to this assembly. But what? Isn't an Italian senator preferable to a provincial senator? What I think on this point, I will show, if this part of my proposal as censor is approved; but I do not think that the inhabitants of the provinces should be excluded from the Senate, if they can do it honour.″

″This is the very illustrious and powerful colonia of the Viennese, which has long been sending senators to this assembly. Was it not from this colonia, that Lucius Vestinus came, one of many, a rare ornament of the equestrian order, for whom I have a very special affection and whom I am keeping close to me at the moment for my own business? I beg you, honour his sons with the first functions of the priesthood, so that as the years go by, they may advance in dignity. May I be permitted to withhold as infamous the name of this thief whom I detest, of this prodigy in palestry, who brought the consulship into his house even before his colony had obtained the full right of Roman citizenship. I can say the same of his brother, worthy of pity perhaps, but made unworthy by this misfortune of being able to be a senator in a position to assist you.″

″But it's time, Tiberius Caesar Germanicus, to discover to the Conscript Fathers what your speech tend toward, because you've already reached the extreme boundary of the Gaul of Narbonne.″

″All these distinguished young men on whom I cast my eyes, you do not regret seeing them among the senators any more, than Persicus, a man of noble race and my friend, do not regrets reading on the portraits of his ancestors the name Allobrogic! If, then, you agree with me that this is the case, what else is there left for you to wish for, other than I make you touch with your finger the soil itself, beyond the boundary of the province of Narbonne, sending you senators, while we have no reason to repent counting people from Lyon among the members of our order? With hesitation, it is true, Conscript Fathers, I stepped out beyond the provincial boundary you know and with which you are familiar; but it is time to openly plead the cause of Long Haired Gaul. If I am accused of this war it waged for ten years against the divine Julius, I would counter with a hundred years of inviolable loyalty and devotion in many of the critical circumstances in which we found ourselves. When Drusus, my father, subdued Germania, they ensured his safety by keeping the country behind him in profound peace, and however, when he was called to this war, he was busy making the census in Gaul, a new operation and out of the habits of the Gauls. We know too well how difficult this operation still is for us, even though it involves nothing other than publicly establishing the state of our resources!...″
