= Amphitheatre of the Three Gauls =

Ancient Roman amphitheater in Lyon, France

Coordinates: 45°46′14″N 4°49′50″E

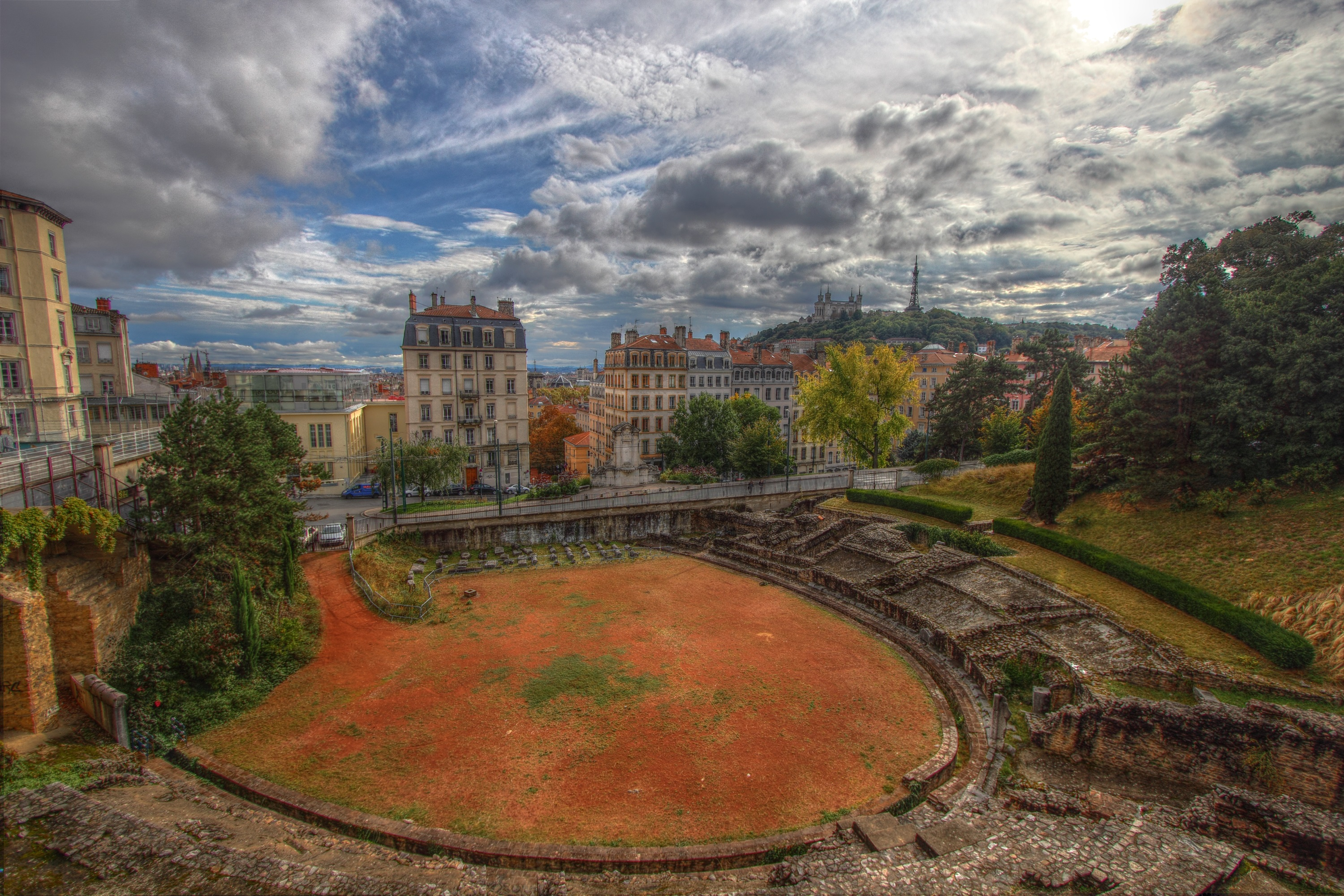
The Amphitheatre of the Three Gauls

The Amphitheatre of the Three Gauls (French: Amphithéâtre des Trois Gaules) of Lugdunum (Lyon) was part of the Sanctuary of the Three Gauls dedicated to the cult of Rome and Augustus celebrated by the 60 Gallic tribes when they gathered at Lugdunum. In 1961, it was classified as a monument historique.

== History ==
=== First building ===
The amphitheatre was built at the foot of the La Croix-Rousse hill at what was then the confluence of the Rhône and Saône . An inscription on one of the blocks found in 1957 (Inscription latine des Trois Gaules, n°217 (AE 1959, n°61)) connects the amphitheatre with the sanctuary of Rome and Augustus and allows its origins to be identified.

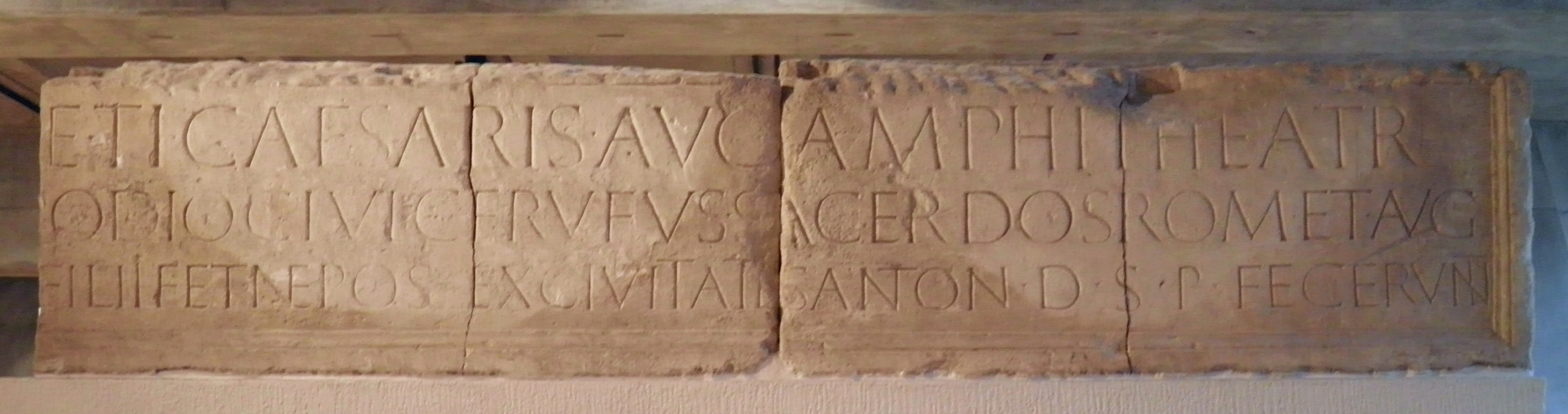

[...]E TI(beris) CAESARIS AVG(vsti) AMPHITHEATR

[...]ODIO C IVL C[?] RVFVS SACERDOS ROM(ae) ET AVG(vsti)

[...]FILII F. ET NEPOS [-]X CIVITATE SANTON. D(e) S(ua). P(ecunia).FECERVNT

Which can be completed as

[... Pro salvt]/e Ti(beri) Caesaris Avg(vsti) amphitheatr[-...] / [ ......... cvm] pod/io C(aivs) Ivl(ivs) C(aii) f(ilivs) Rvfvs sacerdos Romae et Avg(vsti) / [ ...... C(aivs) Ivlivs C(aii) ?] filii f(ilivs) et nepos ex civitate Santon(orvm) d(e) s(va) p(ecvnia) fecervnt.
For the safety of Tiberius Caesar Augustus, C. Julius Rufus, citizen of the city of Santons (Saintes), priest of Rome and of Augustus, [and Caius Julius ?...] his son and grandson built this amphitheatre and its podium at their own expense.

This dates the building to 19 AD. The figures who financed its construction belonged to an old Gallic family in Saintes which had held Roman citizenship since the Gallic Wars and also built the Arch of Germanicus there. The curious formula "filii f(ilius)" perhaps derives from a wish to affirm the antiquity and continuity of the family's lineage, as on the Arch of Germanicus, which names Rufus's ancestors.

Other stones bear the names of Gallic tribes (Arverni, Tricasses, Bituriges) confirming its identification as federal sanctuary.

Excavations have revealed a basement of three elliptical walls linked by cross-walls and a channel surrounding the oval central arena. The arena was slightly sloped, with the building's south section supported by a now-vanished vault. The arena's dimensions are 67.6m by 42m, analogous to those at the arenas at Nîmes and Arles, though with a smaller number of rows of seats (probably only four levels) that gave the amphitheatre external dimensions of 81m by 60m (much smaller than those of Nîmes, which was 133m by 101m).

This phase of the amphitheatre housed games which accompanied the imperial cult, with its low capacity (1,800 seats) being enough for delegations from the 60 Gallic tribes.

=== Expansion ===
The amphitheatre was expanded at the start of the 2nd century, according to J. Guey by C. Julius Celse, procurator of Gallia Lugdunensis from 130 to 136. Two galleries were added around the old amphitheatre, raising its width from 25 meters to 105 meters and its capacity to about 20,000 seats (though this was still modest compared to the amphitheatres at Nîmes and Arles). In so doing it made it a building open to the whole population of Lugdunum and its environs. Historians identify the building as the site of Saints Blandina and Pothinus's martyrdoms as part of the persecution in 177 and a post in the middle of the arena commemorates this event and Pope John-Paul II's visit to Lyon in 1986.

=== Rediscovery ===
A 16th century plan of Lyon indicates the survival to that date of some arches (probably substructures) and a hollow (the arena) known as "Corbeille de la Déserte". The first excavations between 1818 and 1820 revealed the perimeter of the arena before re-covering it, allowing urban expansion in the 19th century to destroy the south half of the amphitheatre remains. From 1956 serious excavations were begun, followed by 1966/67, 1971/72 and 1976/78 campaigns, leading to the exposed remains on show today. The modest remains which had survived (the supporting walls for half of the amphitheatre's superstructure) were integrated into the Jardin des Plantes and opened to visitors.

== See also ==
- List of Roman amphitheatres

== Bibliography ==
- (in French) Histoire et Archéologie de la France ancienne, Rhône Alpes, André Pelletier, André Blanc, Pierre Broise, Jean Prieur, éditions Horvath, 1988
- (in French) La France gallo-romaine, Pierre Gros, éditions Nathan, 1991
