= Sarcophagus of the Triumph of Bacchus (Lyon) =

Art work in the Gallo-Roman Museum of Lyon

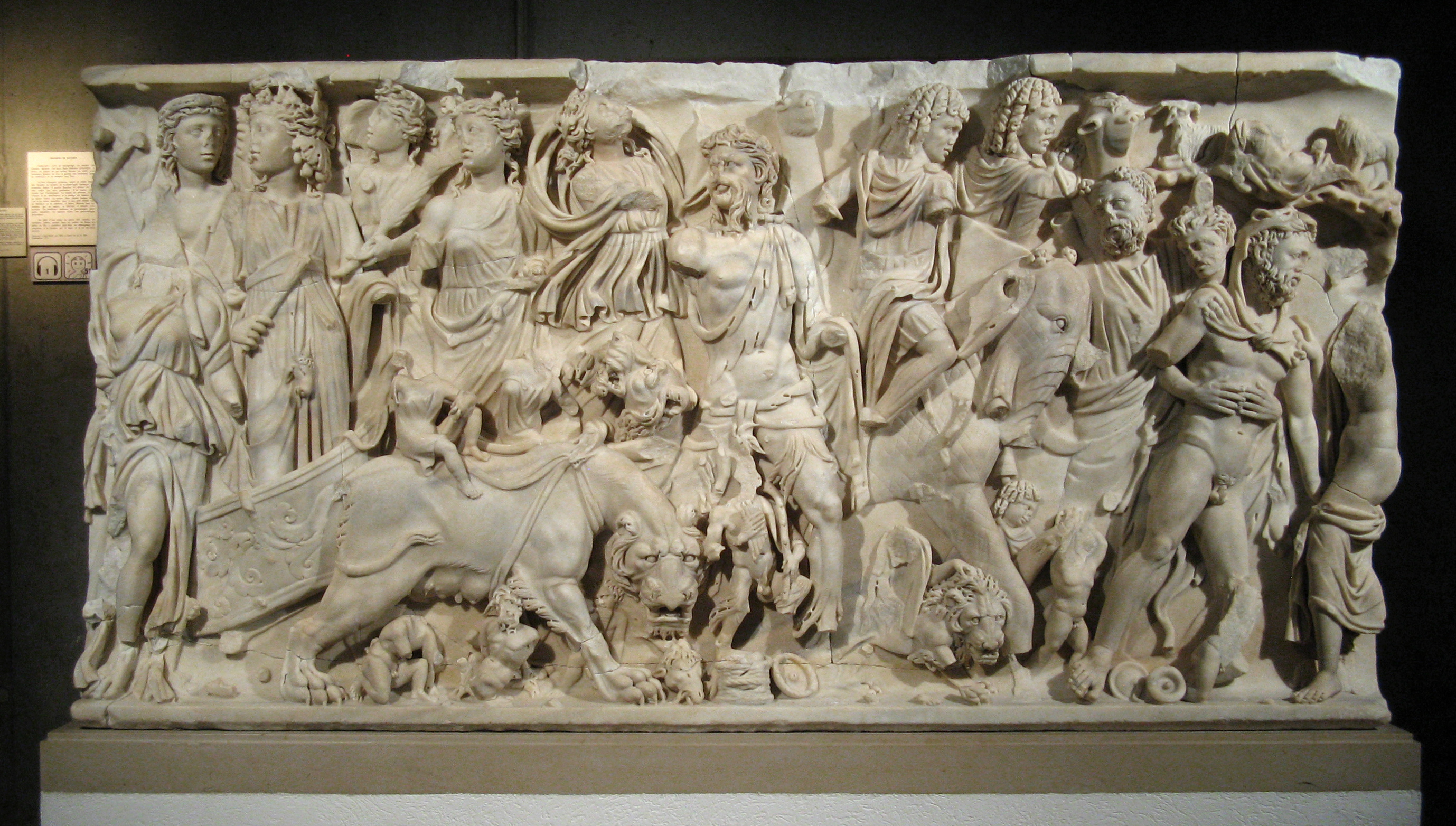
The Sarcophagus of the Triumph of Bacchus

The Sarcophagus of the Triumph of Bacchus is a monumental ancient Roman stone sarcophagus of Carrara marble. The style and high quality of its reliefs and the choice of Bacchus triumphing over India as its subject suggests it came from a Roman workshop and possibly dates to the start of the 3rd century, from the reign of Caracalla to that of Elagabalus.

The sarcophagus was discovered in 1824 on the Saint-Just hill in Lyon, France, during the digging of the foundations for the 19th-century church of Saint Irenaeus. It was found at a depth of c. 4 m (13 ft), between the staircase of the church and an adjacent house, but because of a lack of funds, it was left in place and reburied. In 1845, at the urging of Ambroise Comarmond, it was reexcavated and transported to the Musée lapidaire. It is now in the Musée gallo-romain de Fourvière in Lyon.

== Description ==
The sarcophagus's relief represents the mythological scene of Bacchus's triumph over the Indies in his youth. It is made up of two registers.

One is vertical, with a group of figures around the central figure of Pan looking backwards and wearing a nebris (a panther skin, a symbolic attribute like Bacchus's deerskin or Hercules's lion skin), and the other horizontal from top to bottom, with genre scenes. A child-Pan stands between Pan's legs, holding a lagobolon (a stick used for hunting hares) and playing the flute.

Either side of Pan is a group of six figures. On the left hand side of the relief is Bacchus in his triumphal chariot, decorated with acanthus foliage and drawn by two panthers (his favoured animals) in the foreground. He holds his thyrsus in his right hand and wears a royal tunic as worn by Hellenistic sovereigns and a woman's chiton covered by a nebris belted at the waist. He is crowned by a Victory standing behind him and holding a palm in her left hand. To Bacchus's right sits Ariadne, crowned with foliage but with her body partly hidden by a Bacchante.

The right hand group illustrates Bacchus's triumph over India with exotic figures - captives wearing a short tunic, mantle and barbarian German trousers and with braided hairstyles. One of them rides an elephant whose trunk and tusks were carved in very high relief and have not survived. The elephant's face is covered in corymbs, his body is covered in a net and his neck bears a bell. Between the elephant's forefeet is a lion, and behind him are exotic animals from the Orient and Africa - camel or giraffe. To the extreme left is Hercules in his lionskin, trying to approach a nymph who pushes her right hand against his shoulder. He appears to struggle but is supported by a satyr.

Hercules's drunkenness is associated with the cult of Bacchus and (having travelled to the ends of the earth) his presence is another indicator of a foreign land. The link between Bacchus and Hercules is confirmed by the figure of Silenus.

In the top right corner is a shepherd lying between two goats and accompanied by a genius loci. The space between the main figures is occupied by smaller elements, such as squatting goats. The short sides of the sarcophagus are carved in bas relief - the left side has a smiling Pan or satyr holding a lagobolon and a flute, with a stone cyst with a serpent slithering from it and with a bacchante next to him playing a tambourine; on the right side is a satyr approaching a Bacchante before a garlanded altar with fruits and pine cones.

== Bibliography ==
- Nouvel Espérandieu, 2006, n° 238, pp. 76–81.
- Anne-Catherine Le Mer, Claire Chomer, Carte archéologique de la Gaule, Lyon 69/2, Paris, 2007, pp. 664 & 665.
