= Gaius Julius Vercondaridubnus =

Gaius Julius Vercondaridubnus (fl. 1st century BCE) was a Gaul of the civitas of the Aedui. He was the first high priest (sacerdos) of the Altar of the Deified Caesar at Lugdunum (modern Lyon, France), which was inaugurated August 1 in either 12 or 10 BCE at the confluence of the Saône and Rhone rivers. The dating of the inauguration to 12 would connect it to the year in which Augustus assumed the office of pontifex maximus.

The Imperial cult at Lugdunum was the first and most important in the Western empire. It was established by Drusus, the stepson of Augustus, in the wake of a Gallic rebellion. Representatives from more than 60 Gallic nations attended. The date of August 1 seems to have been chosen to honor Augustus, being the Kalends of the month newly renamed after him, and in the Celtic calendar also a significant date, later celebrated as Lughnasadh.

In addition to his priesthood of the Imperial cult for the Sanctuary of the Three Gauls (Tres Galliae), Vercondaridubnus held Roman citizenship. He also had a role in his provincial deliberative body (concilium), which had legal power to negotiate with the Roman administration. Although the priesthood was an annual office, its holders would have held great influence thereafter. As the most notable men of the Three Gauls were invited to the inaugural ceremony, Vercondaridubnus would have been someone of great consequence to both Romans and Gauls in his province. The Aedui had been allies of Rome since the 120s BCE, with the relationship expressed formally as that of “brothers” (fratres), and in the 1st century AD produced the first Roman senators from Gallia Comata.

The name Gaius Julius Vercondaridubnus is a hybrid of Latin and Celtic nomenclature. His Latin praenomen and nomen are markers of his citizenship; he may have assumed the name Gaius Julius in honour of Gaius Julius Caesar (as the divus Julius of Imperial cult). His father, like other Gaii Julii of the Aedui, may even have been granted Roman citizenship directly by Caesar in the aftermath of the Gallic Wars, since it was customary for naturalized citizens to take the gentilic name of their patron. The Celtic personal name Vercondaridubnus has been interpreted as meaning “The Dark One of Great Wrath.” The prefix ver- is hierarchical (“above, highest, supreme”); con- (com-) is combinative (“with”) or intensive. The element dari- refers to a violent emotion such as rage. Dubn- is a relatively common Celtic element meaning “dark, shadowy,” perhaps “hidden, secret” and hence “deep, profound”; as a noun, dubnos can mean “the Deep World,” i.e., the underworld. Since Vercondaridubnus was a priest, this meaning of dubnos may apply.

In the 1st century CE, the successors of Vercondaridubnus included Marcus Lucterius Sencianus of the Cadurces and Gaius Julius Rufus of the Santones.
