= Neptune of Lyon =

Largest statue of Neptune found in France

- La statue de Neptune
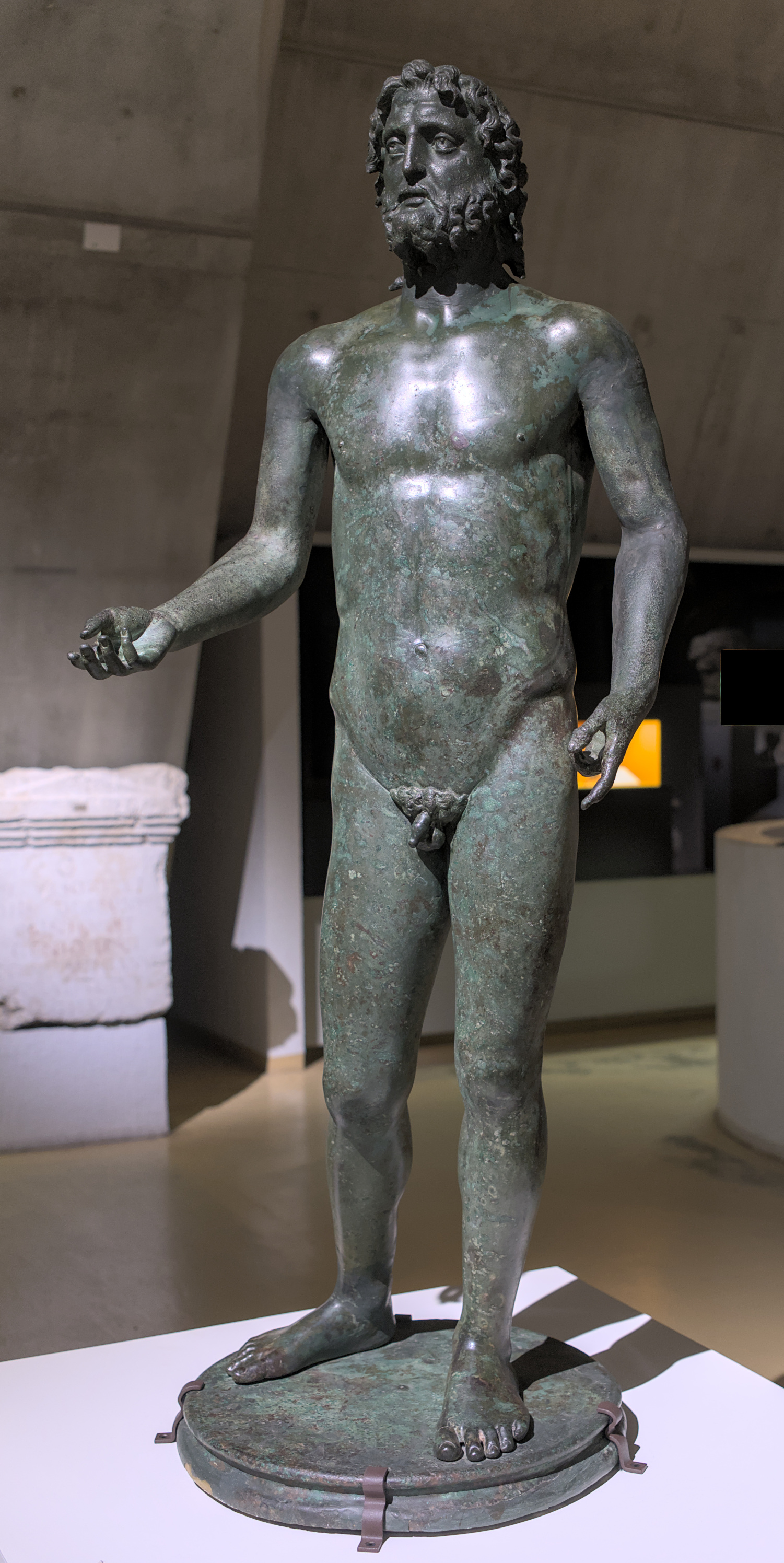
- Material: Bronze
- Length: 63 cm (25 in)
- Height: 143 cm (56 in)
- Width: 55 cm (22 in)
- Created: 2nd century
- Discovered: 28 March 1859; Discovered in Lyon in the bed of the Rhône
- Place: Lyon, France
- Present location: Lugdunum Museum
- Identification: br.054
- Culture: Gallo-Roman culture
- https://lugdunum.grandlyon.com/Oeuvre/2587-Statue-en-bronze-de-Neptune

Neptune of Lyon, or Neptune of Rhône, is a 2nd century Gallo-Roman sculpture of the god Neptune. Discovered on 28 March 1859 in the Rhône, right along the left bank between the Hôtel-Dieu and La Guillotière bridges in Lyon, France. It is the largest bronze sculpture of the god in France, and also the largest Roman Gaul statue, primarily made for worship in Lugdunum, Gallia Lugdunensis. After its immediate discovery, it was donated to the Museum of Fine Arts of Lyon (MFA Lyon) on 1 April 1859, but is now part of the Lugdunum Museum collection, under inventory number br.054.

== Description ==
The Neptune of Lyon measures 1.43 m × 0.55 m × 0.63 m (4 ft 8 in × 1 ft 10 in × 2 ft 1 in), and is made of hollow cast and welded bronze on a round, molded base. It was initially speculated to have been Jupiter at first, but the identity of Neptune was made thanks to the curled, "wet-ringed" hair. Whether deposited in the river, or abandoned there, the further links to the Rhône solidified its attribution. Though now missing, a fish or a dolphin would have been held in his right hand, and a trident in his left. His eyes would have been inlaid with silver.

The MFA Lyon's study of the statue indicates that Neptune's attribution to the sea was extended to being a water god in general. Classified as a large effigy made in a local Gallic workshop, the Neptune of Lyon is also noted to be cruder than other Roman sculptures, with a borrowed pose, a long torso, and short legs. The sculptors of the workshop likely attempted to imitate some Lysippic models.

In its original usage, it likely was displayed in a city temple in Lugdunum, and is likely merged in Gallo-Roman and Celtic worship.

From 6 February to 7 June 2026, the Neptune of Lyon was displayed in Rome for the first time at the Giovanni Barracco Museum of Ancient Sculpture, as part of a partnership and loan exchange between the Rome's City Council and the Lugdunum Museum, which commemorates the latter's 50th anniversary of its founding.
