= Abascantus =

2nd-century AD Greek physician

Abascantus (Ancient Greek: Ἀβάσκαντος) was a physician of Lugdunum, who probably lived in the 2nd century AD. He is mentioned several times by Galen, who has also preserved an antidote invented by him against the bite of serpents. The name appears in numerous Latin inscriptions in Gruter's collection, five of which refer to a freedman of Augustus, who is supposed by some scholars to be the same person that is mentioned by Galen. This identification is uncertain, as also whether Parakletios Abaskanthos (Παρακλήτιος Ἀβάσκανθος) in Galen refers to the subject of this article.
