= Sanctuary of the Three Gauls =

Focal structure built by Rome in Lyon, France

Coordinates: 45°46′14″N 4°49′50″E

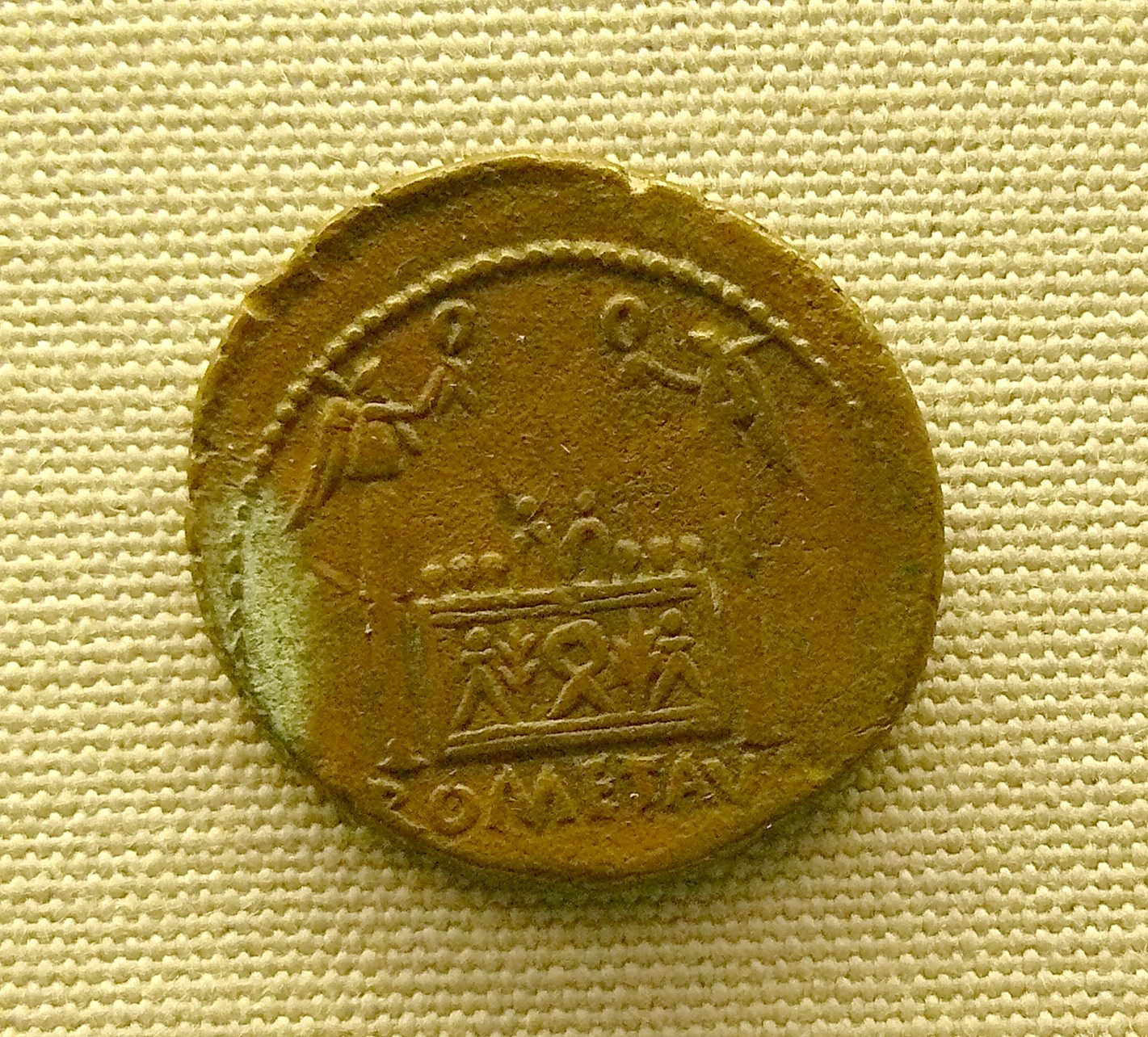
The altar of the Sanctuary of the Three Gauls, on a dupondius issued under Augustus (Musée d'archéologie nationale de Saint-Germain-en-Laye, inv. 2396 N)

The Sanctuary of the Three Gauls (Tres Galliae) (French: Sanctuaire fédéral des Trois Gaules) was the focal structure within an administrative and religious complex established by Rome in the very late 1st century BC at Lugdunum (the site of modern Lyon in France). Its institution served to federalise and develop Gallia Comata as an Imperial province under Augustus, following the Roman conquest of Gaul carried out by Augustus's predecessor Julius Caesar. The distinctively Gallo-Roman development of the Imperial sanctuary and its surrounding complex are well attested by literary, epigraphic, numismatic and archaeological evidence.

== Foundation and function ==
The Imperial cult sanctuary at Lugdunum was the earliest and most important institution of its kind in the Western Roman empire. Its establishment at the junction of three new Imperial provinces, later collectively known as Tres Galliae (the Three Gauls), embodied a policy of integrated military, civil and religious settlement among the unstable Western provinces of the newly established Principate. It was founded by Drusus in rapid response to a rebellion provoked by the census of Gallia Comata ("long-haired" Gaul) in 12 BC.

Lugdunum provided a centralised, permanent base for the Imperial governorships of Gallia Aquitania, Gallia Belgica and Gallia Lugdunensis, and an annual, Roman-style concilium (council) for their provincial elites, based on existing Gallic political and religious practices. The monumentally lavish and comprehensively Roman development of the Sanctuary and its associated buildings provided a context for the acculturation of a new Romano-Gallic polity under the pax Romana, in which the Roman military maintained a relatively discreet local presence.

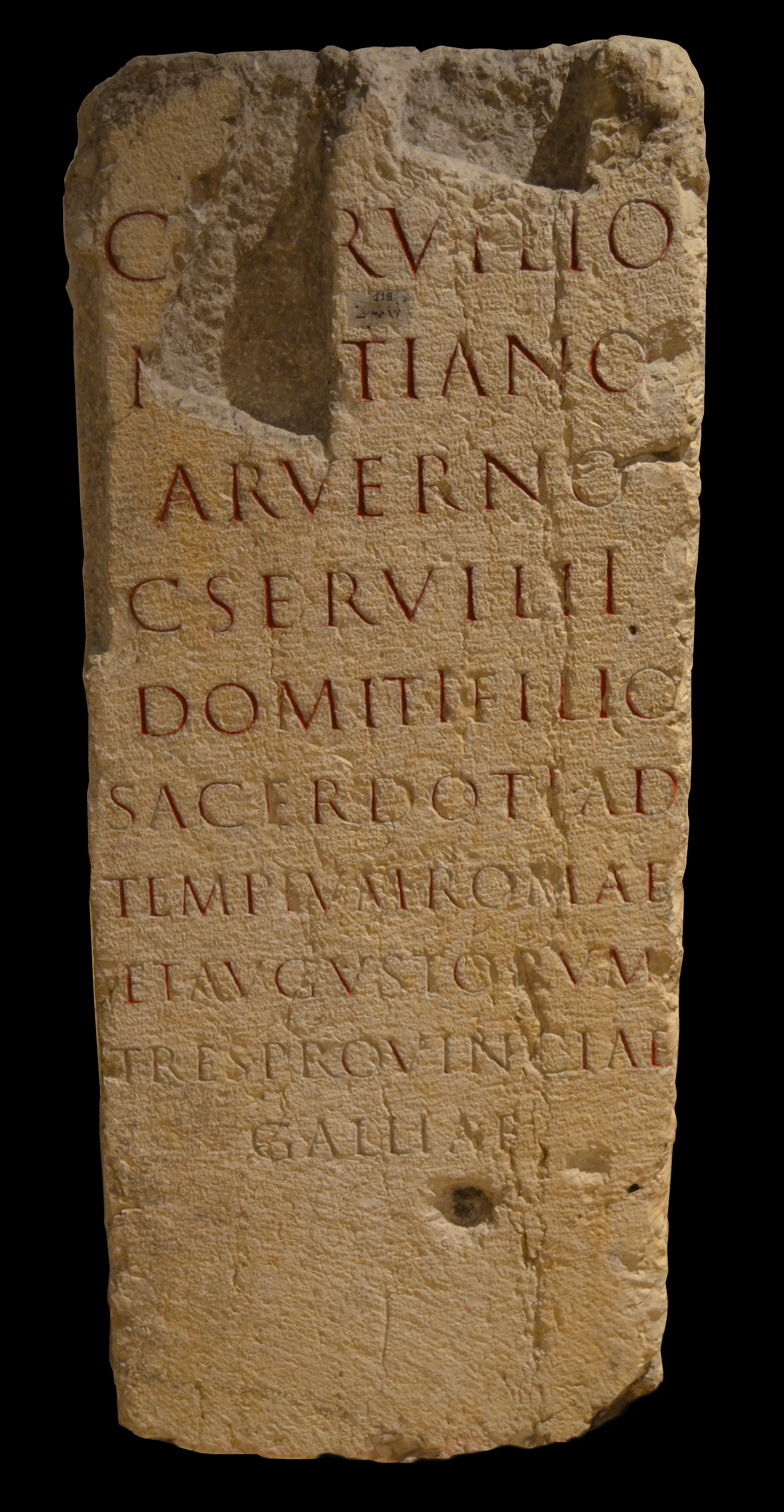
Inscription of Caius Servilius Martianus, of the Arverni, who served as a priest (sacerdos) at the Temple of Roma and the Augusti. Lugdunum museum, Lyon.

As stepson to Augustus, Drusus represented the Imperial family and as provincial governor, he was also augur. The inaugural day of the sanctuary – August 1 of either 10 BC or 12 BC – was important to both Romans and Gauls. August – formerly Sextilis in the Roman calendar – had been renamed in honour of Augustus, and its kalends (the first day of the month) was particularly auspicious as the anniversary of his victory at Alexandria. A foundation (or an inauguration) in 12 BC would have coincided with Augustus' assumption of office as pontifex maximus. The ara (altar) was dedicated to Dea Roma and Augustus and its first high priest (sacerdos) was Caius Julius Vercondaridubnus, a Gaul of the Aeduan elite. His name indicates his Roman citizenship and Gallic origins - his election to Imperial priesthood may confirm a preference based on his personal standing and that of his civitas as fratres ("brothers", or allies) of Rome.

Drusus invited 60 aristocratic delegates to the opening ceremony as representatives of the "Three Gauls". These are presumed to be the first members of the official concilium Galliarum. The office of sacerdos required Roman citizenship but the early concilium combined citizen and non-citizens. The sacredos would have been a person of great consequence within the concilium Galliarum and his own provincial ordo. His influence would have extended well beyond his term of office, which was - unlike the lifetime priesthoods of Rome itself - limited to a single year. In effect, the priesthood provided an important step in the provincial cursus honorum.

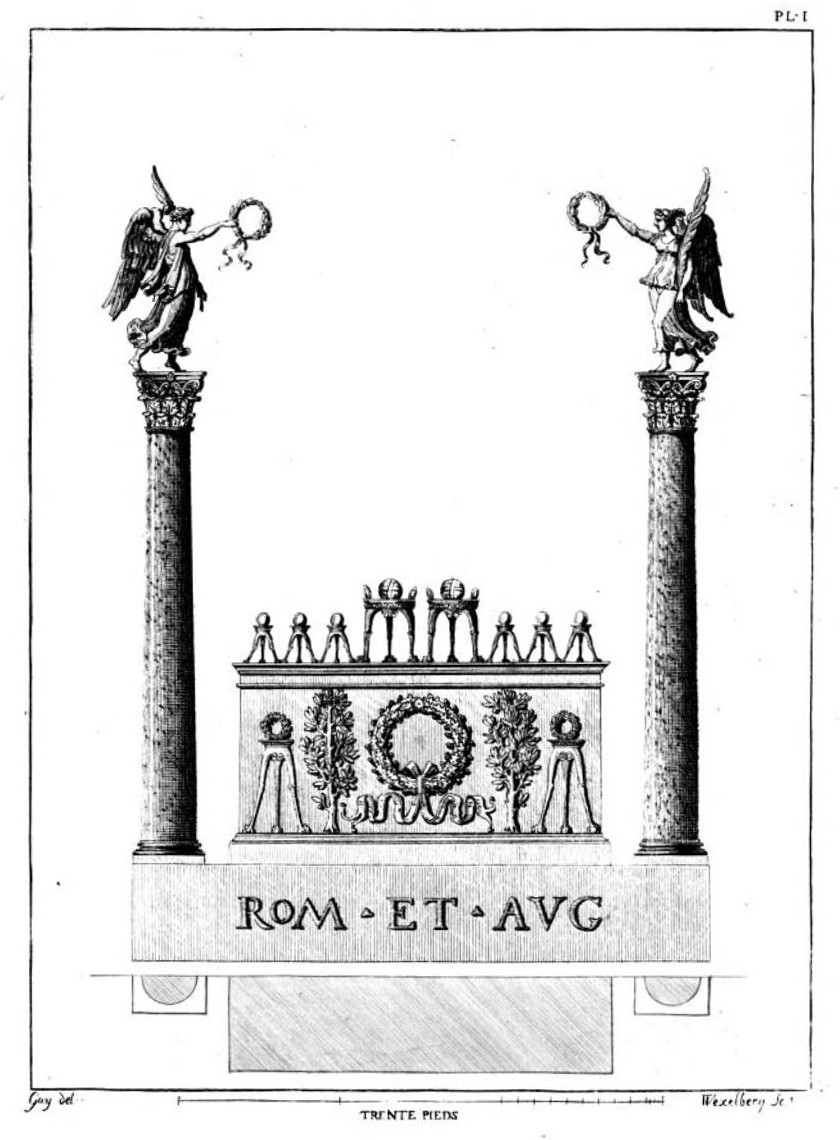
Altar of Gauls, reconstructed from the image on Roman coins

The concilia at Lugdunum were also displays of loyalty and a developing role within the Roman province, which involved the renewal of vows through priestly sacrifice at the ara, feasting, games (ludi), contests of eloquence and poetry. This calendrical gathering was accommodated by the building of a small amphitheatre, which was later much expanded. Lugdunum was also the site of a major Imperial mint, whose coinage provides a principal source of evidence for the form and development of the altar. The security requirement of the mint has been presumed to account for the presence of Lugdunum's single military cohort.

=== Later Imperial development ===
Following his defeat of Clodius Albinus and his allies at Lugdunum, Septimius Severus re-founded and reformed its Imperial cult centre as an instrument of suppression and autocracy. The image of dea Roma was removed from the ara and confined to the temple, along with the images of the living and deceased Augusti – a combination unique in the Western Empire. Fishwick interprets the reformed rites of Septimius as those offered a Roman paterfamilias by his slaves. This development took place shortly after 198/9 AD. Its duration and subsequent developments are unknown.

== Sanctuary ==
The sanctuary was located on the hillside of la Croix-Rousse. The first and main altar can be reconstructed from texts and currency depictions. The geographer Strabo described it in context: "[Lugdunum] is the most populous of all the cities of Celtica except Narbo; for not only do people use it as an emporium, but the Roman governors coin their money there, both the silver and the gold. Again, the temple that was dedicated to Caesar Augustus by all the Galatae in common is situated in front of this city at the junction of the rivers. And in it is a noteworthy altar, bearing an inscription of the names of the tribes, sixty in number; and also images from these tribes, one from each tribe, and also another large altar."

Fishwick suggests that the images (bronze statues) and inscriptions of Strabo's account are stylistically Greek additions to the ara some time after its inauguration. The monumental altar and its 50-meter base were made in marble. It was flanked by two winged victories of gilt bronze, holding palms and gold crowns, standing on ionic capitals, set on columns assumed to be the later source for the four pillars of the transept crossing of the basilica of St-Martin-d'Ainay, which support the dome. These were made from two longer pillars of Egyptian syenite, recovered in the 11th century and sawn in half. The open altar appears to have been rebuilt (or adapted) as a covered temple in 121 AD, in the reign of Hadrian. The larger altar was the focus of cult to the genius of the living emperor and dea Roma. The temple was dedicated to the cult of deceased Imperial divi, and major Roman and local deities.

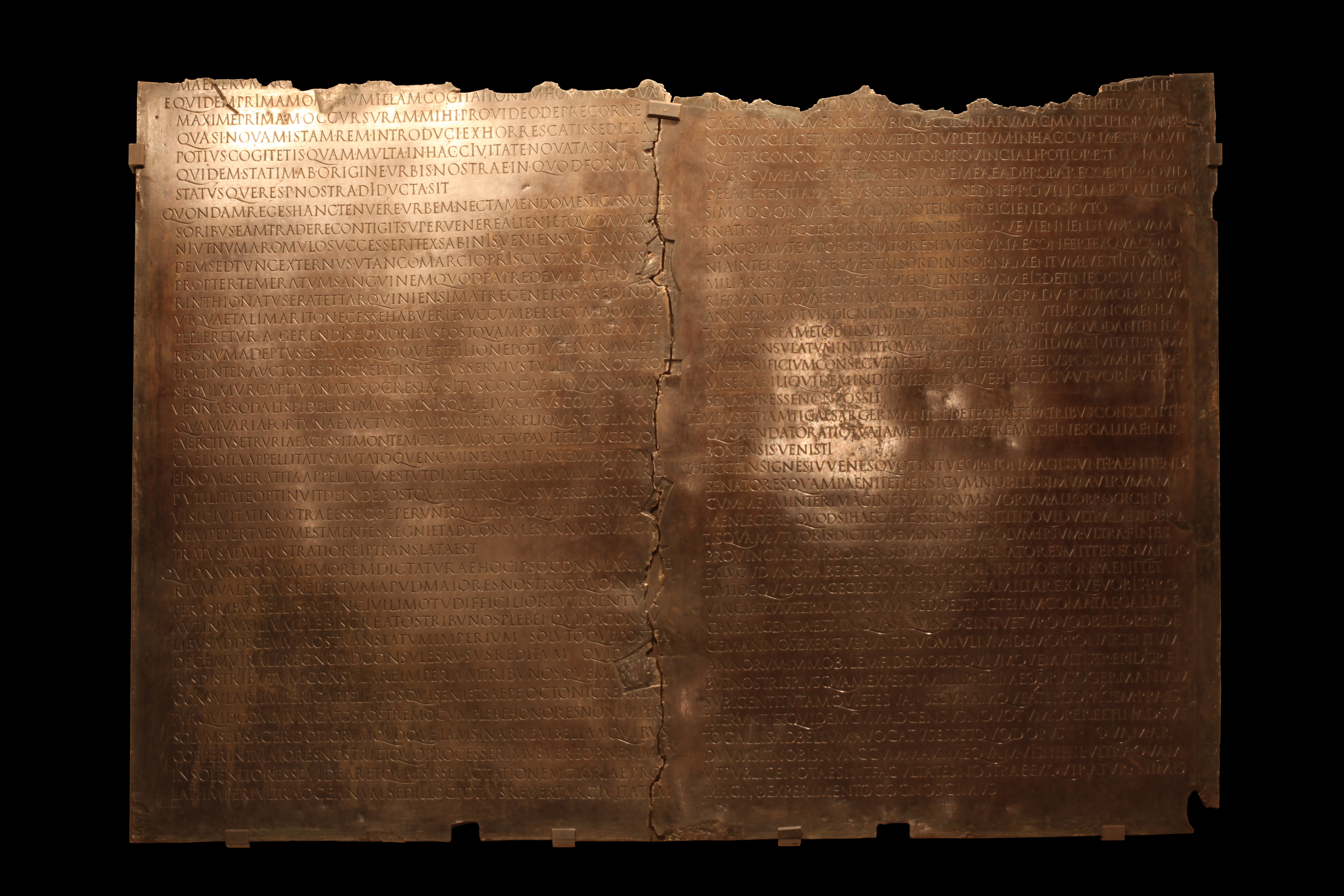
Lyon Tablet, in Lugdunum museum, Lyon

This sanctuary was also the find-spot for the Lyon Tablet, a bronze plaque of 2.5 by 1.93 m on which is engraved Claudius's 48 AD speech making Gallic chieftains eligible for Roman magistracies and membership of the Roman Senate – a version of the speech also survives in Tacitus. It was found by a draper in 1528, in his vineyard on the site of the sanctuary, and is now held in the Gallo-Roman Museum of Lyon.
