= Lugdunum =

Ancient Roman city on the site of modern Lyon, France

- Colonia Copia Claudia Augusta Lugdunum
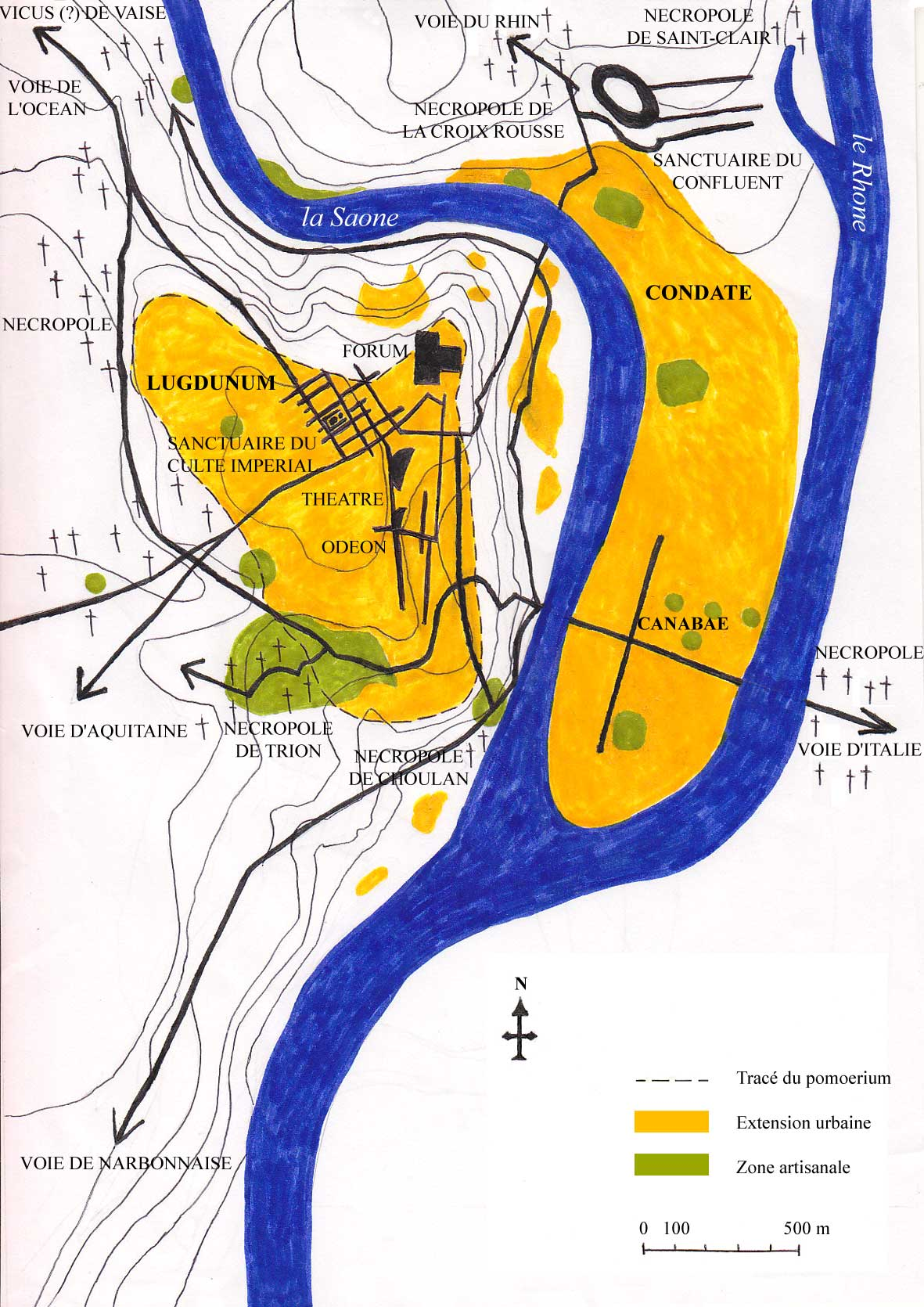
- Map of the city

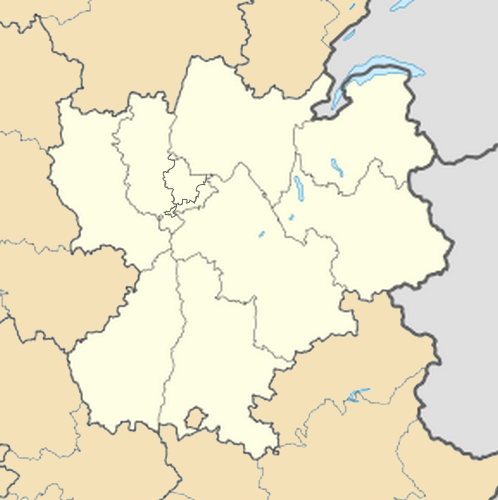
- Location within France Lugdunum (Rhône-Alpes)
- 45°45′35″N 4°49′10″E
- Type: Roman city
- Periods: Roman Republic to Roman Empire
- Location: Lyon, France
- Region: Gallia Lugdunensis

History
- Built: 43 BC
- Built by: Lucius Munatius Plancus

Site notes
- Area: 200 ha (490 acres)

Lugdunum (also spelled Lugudunum, Latin: [ɫʊɡ(ʊ)ˈduːnʊ̃ː]; modern Lyon, France) was an important Roman city in Gaul, established on the current site of Lyon. The Roman city was founded in 43 BC by Lucius Munatius Plancus. Two emperors, Claudius and Caracalla, were born in the city.

Lugnunum's location at the confluence of the Rhône and Saône, between the Alps to the east and the Massif Central to the west, ensured Lugdunum's strategic and commercial importance in Roman times until late antiquity. It served as a staging ground for Roman expansion into, or defense of, northern Gaul and Germany, as well as the administrative centre of the northwestern provinces. Trade flourished along its rivers and it developed a large and cosmopolitan population.

== Name ==
The Roman city was founded as Colonia Copia Felix Munatia, a name invoking prosperity and the blessing of the gods. The city became increasingly referred to as Lugdunum (and occasionally Lugudunum) by the end of the 1st century AD.

Lugdunum is a Latinization of the Gaulish *Lugudunon, meaning "Fortress (or hill) of (the god) Lugus" or, alternately, "Fortress of the champion" (if *lugus is a common noun cognate with Old Irish lug "warrior, hero, fighter").

In addition to continental epigrams referencing Lugus, the Celtic god has been connected to popular figures in Ireland and Britain as are found in medieval Irish literature as Lug(h) and in medieval Welsh literature as Lleu (also spelled Llew).

According to Pseudo-Plutarch, Lugdunum takes its name from an otherwise unattested Gaulish word lugos, that he says means "raven" (κόρακα), and the Gaulish word for an eminence or high ground (τόπον ἐξέχοντα), dunon.

An early interpretation of Gaulish Lugduno as meaning "Desired Mountain" is recorded in a gloss in the 9th-century Endlicher's Glossary, but this may in fact reflect a native Frankish speaker's folk-etymological attempt at linking the first element of the name, Lugu- (which, by the time this gloss was composed, would have been pronounced lu'u, the -g- having become silent) with the similar-sounding Germanic word for "love", *luβ.

Another early medieval folk-etymology of the name, found in gloss on the Latin poet Juvenal, connects the element Lugu- to the Latin word for "light", lux (luci- in compounds) and translates the name as "Shining Hill" (lucidus mons).

== Pre-Roman settlements ==
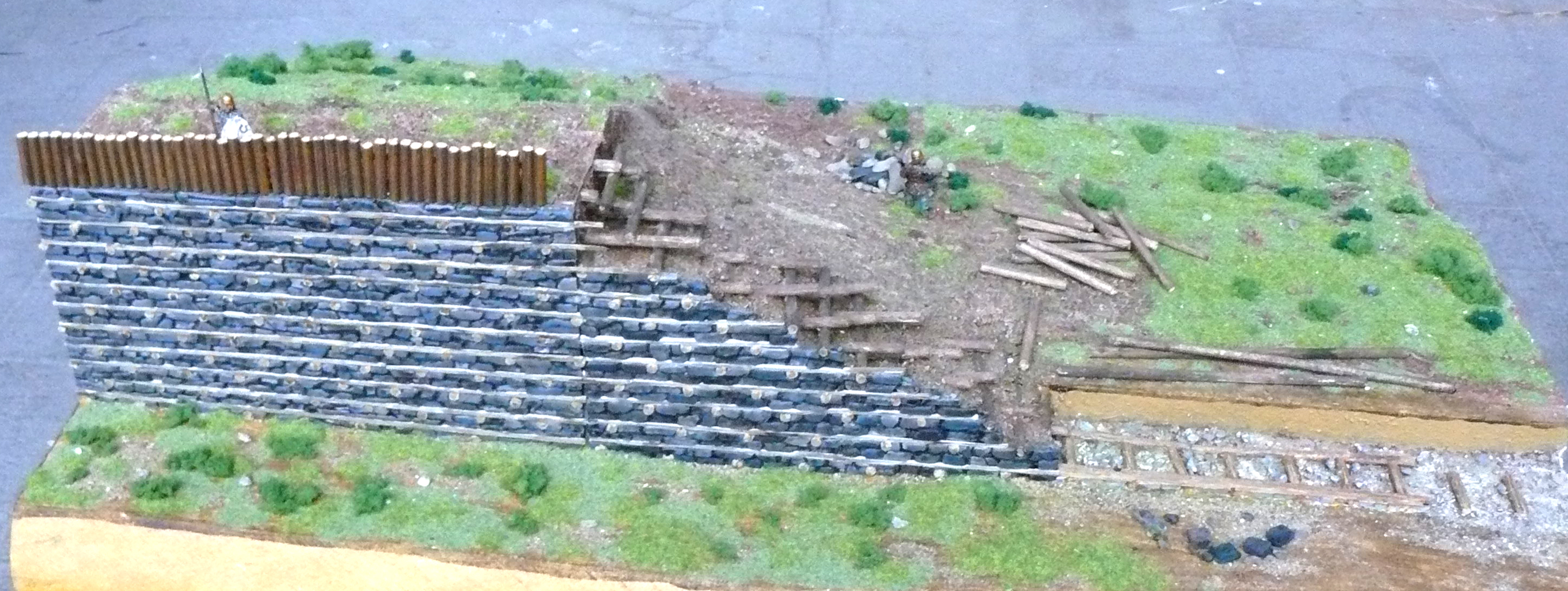
Gallic Murus Gallicus, Lyon, La Tène culture

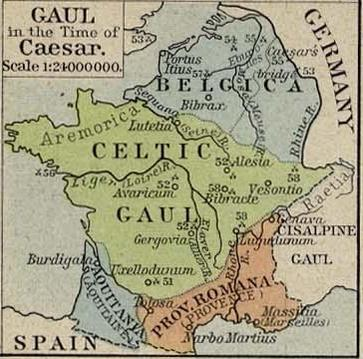
The site of Lugdunum along the border of pre-Roman Gaul and the Roman province of Gallia Narbonensis in the south of modern-day France during the lifetime of Julius Caesar

Archeological evidence shows that Lugdunum was a pre-Gallic settlement as early as Neolithic times and a Gallic settlement from the 4th century BC. It was situated on the Fourvière heights above the Saône river. There was trade with Campania for ceramics and wine and use of some Italic-style home furnishings.

The Romans controlled the southern portion of Gaul by the 2nd century BC, founding the province of Gallia Transalpina in 121 BC. Gaul was conquered for the Romans by Julius Caesar between 58 and 53 BC. His description of the country in his De Bello Gallico is our principal written source of knowledge for pre-Roman Gaul, but there is no specific mention of the area in or around Lugdunum.

== Founding to the Antonine period ==
=== Foundation ===
Roman colonization of Lugdunum began during the War of Mutina, one of the conflicts that followed the assassination of Julius Caesar in 44 BC. According to the historian Cassius Dio, in 43 BC the Roman Senate ordered Munatius Plancus and Lepidus, governors of central and Transalpine Gaul respectively, to found a city for a group of Roman refugees who had been expelled from Vienne (a town about 30 km or 20 miles to the south) by the Allobroges and were encamped at the confluence of the Saône and Rhône rivers. Cassius Dio says the Senate's order was intended to prevent the refugees from joining Mark Antony and becoming further involved in the developing conflict. At the time of its founding, Lugdunum seems to have had a population of several thousand. The citizens were administratively assigned to the Galerian tribe.

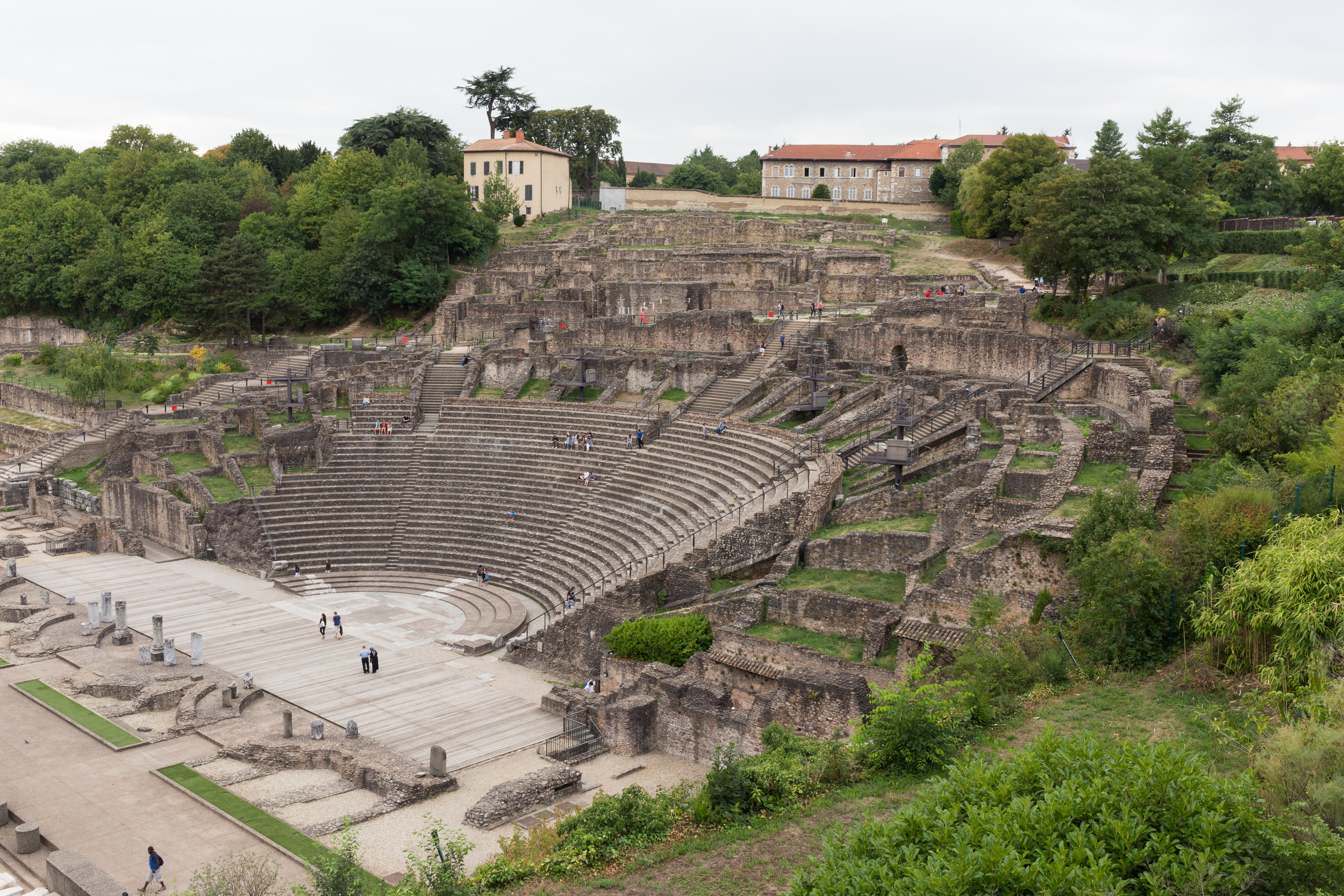
Ancient Theatre of Fourvière

=== The city ===
==== Monuments ====
The aqueduct of the Monts d'Or, completed around 20 BC, was the first of at least four aqueducts supplying water to the city. By AD 14 Lugdunum was, as documented by Strabo, at the junction of four major roads, known collectively as the Via Agrippa. These led south to Narbonensis, Massilia and Italy; north to the Rhine river and Germany; northwest to the English Channel; and west to Aquitania. By 19 AD at least one temple and an amphitheatre (the first in Gaul, known as the Amphitheatre of the Three Gauls) had been built on the slopes of the Croix-Rousse hill, near the Vaise district where Gallic workers worked with precious metals, copper, glass and pottery.

Monument building continued throughout the period, including three additional aqueducts and the Odeon.

==== Economy ====
The Rhône and Saône rivers were navigable, as were most of the rivers of Gaul, and river traffic was heavy. The Lyonnais company of boatmen (nautae) was the largest and "most honored" in Gaul. Archeological evidence suggests the right bank of the Saône had the largest concentration of wharves, quays and warehouses. Lyonnais boatmen dominated the wine trade from Narbonensis and Italy, as well as oil from Spain, to the rest of Gaul. Statues like the Neptune of Lyon, discovered in the Rhône in 1859, express the profound importance of the rivers to Lugdunum's prosperity.

During the reign of Augustus 15 BC the city became an imperial mint, replacing mints in Hispania. It was probably chosen because of its convenient location between sources of silver and gold in Hispania and the legions on the Rhine and Danube. After 12 BC, it was the sole mint producing gold and silver coinage for the whole Roman Empire, a position it retained until Nero moved production back to Rome in 64 AD.

During Claudius' reign, the city's importance was further enhanced by the bridging of the Rhône river. Its depth and swampy valley had been an obstacle to travel and communication to the east. The new route, termed the compendium, shortened the route south to Vienne and made the roads from Lugdunum to Italy and Germany more direct.

Lugdunum had at least two banks and became the principal manufacturing center for pottery, metal working, and weaving in Gaul. Lyonnais terra cotta, pottery and wine were traded throughout Gaul, and many other items were crafted for export.

==== Society ====
In the 2nd century AD, Lugdunum grew to a population of 25,000 to 40,000 persons, served by four aqueducts. The heavy concentration of trade made Lugdunum one of the most cosmopolitan cities of Gaul, and inscriptions attest to a large foreign-born population, especially Italians, Greeks, and immigrants from the oriental provinces of Asia Minor and Syria-Palestine.

The city itself was run by a "senate" of decurions (the ordo decurionum) and a hierarchy of magistrates: quaestors, aediles, and duumvirs. The social classes of the time consisted of the decurions at the top, who could aspire to Senate status, followed by the knights (equites), and the Augustales, six of whom were in charge of the municipal imperial cult. This latter status was the highest distinction to which a wealthy freedman could aspire. Many of the wealthy merchants and craftsmen were freedmen. Below them were the workmen and slaves.

There is evidence of numerous temples and shrines in Lugdunum. Traditional Gallic gods like mallet-bearing Sucellus and the mother goddesses called the Matres (depicted with cornucopiae) continued to be worshiped somewhat syncretistically along with the Roman gods. Additional religious cults came with the oriental immigrants, who brought the eastern mystery religions to the Rhône valley. A major shrine of the Phrygian goddess Cybele was built in nearby Vienne, and she also seems to have found special favor in Lugdunum in the late 1st century and 2nd century.

=== Lugdunum and the emperors ===
==== Early imperial governors ====
Agrippa, Drusus, Tiberius, and Germanicus (born himself in Lugdunum) were among the gubernatorial generals who served in Lugdunum. In 12 BC, Drusus completed an administrative census of the area and dedicated an altar to his stepfather Augustus at the junction of the two rivers. Perhaps to promote a policy of conciliation and integration, all the notable men of the three parts of Gaul were invited. Caius Julius Vercondaridubnus, a member of the Aedui tribe, was installed as the first priest of the new imperial cult sanctuary, which was subsequently known as the Junction Sanctuary or the Sanctuary of the Three Gauls. The altar, with its distinctive vertical end poles, was engraved with the names of 60 Gallic tribes, and was featured prominently on coins from the Lugdunum mint for many years. The "council of the three Gauls" continued to be held annually for nearly three centuries, even after Gaul was divided into provinces.

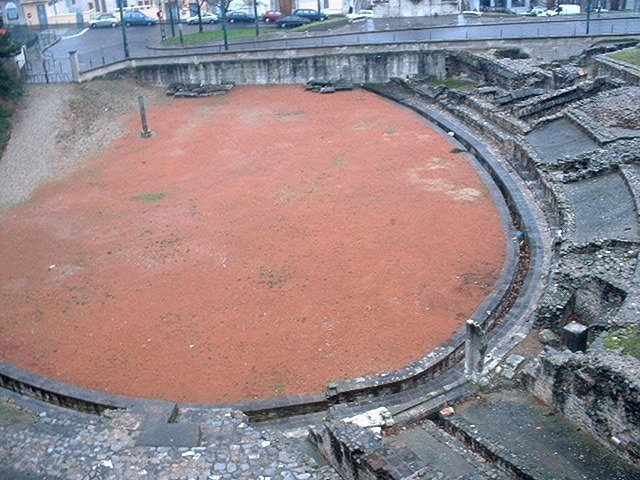
Amphithéâtre des Trois-Gaules in Lyon

==== Caligula ====
Caligula visited Lugdunum in AD 39–40 , at the beginning of his third consulate; the historian Suetonius described the visit as characteristic of this emperor's strange and extravagant reign. Spectacles were staged at the amphitheater to honor and entertain Caligula and his guest, Ptolemy, king of Mauretania (whom the emperor later had murdered). A rhetoric contest was held in which the losers were required to expunge their work with their tongues. He auctioned furniture brought from the palace in Rome, assigning prices and purchasers. When Caligula wanted to get rid of Herod Antipas, Jewish tetrarch of Galilee and Perea, he sent him to exile in Lugdunum.

==== Claudius ====
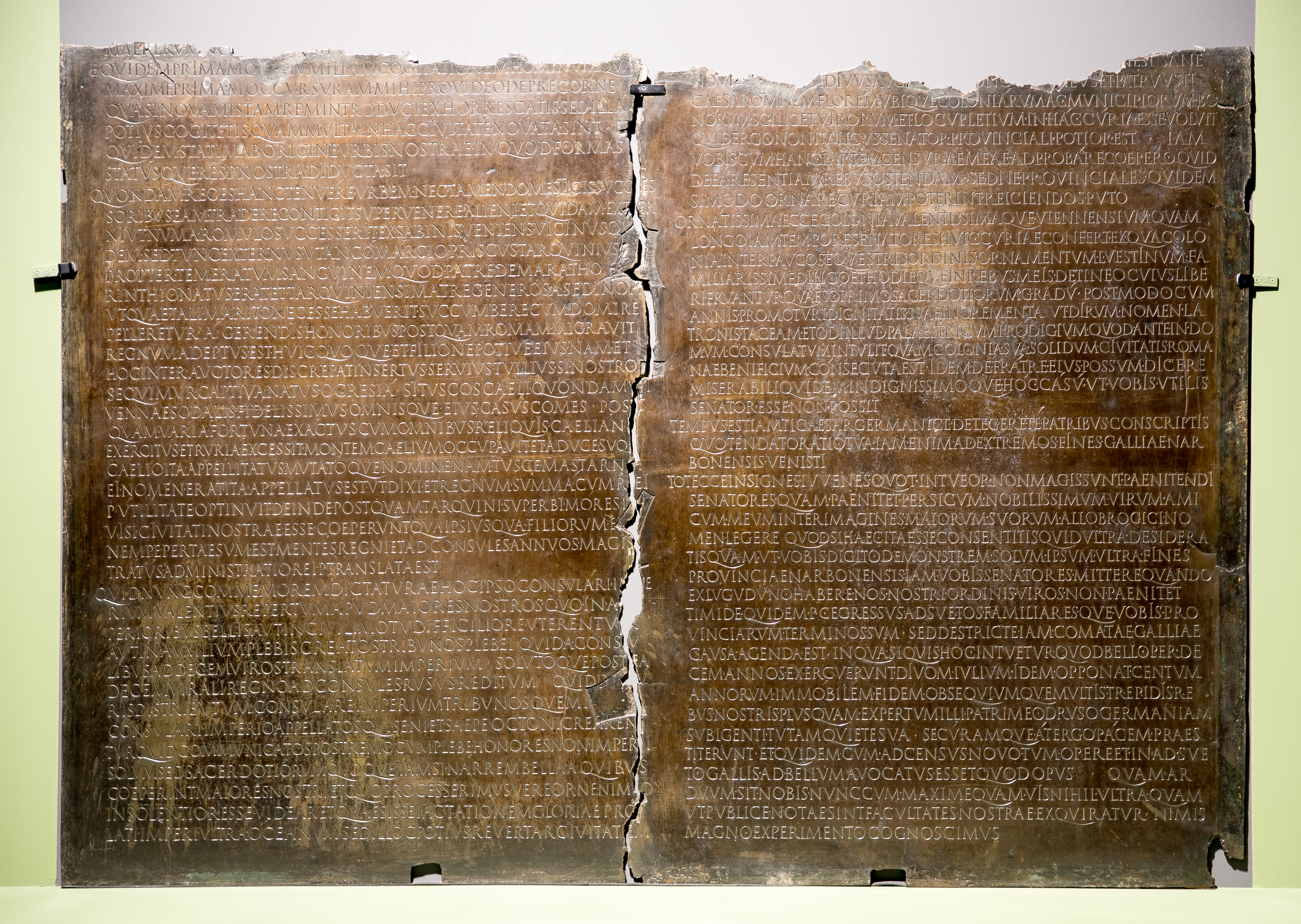
Claudian Tables in Lugdunum museum

Claudius was born in Lugdunum in 10 BC and lived there for at least two years. As emperor, he returned in AD 43 en route to his conquest of Britain and stopped again after its victorious conclusion in AD 47. A fountain honoring his victory has been uncovered. In AD 48, emperor Claudius asked the Senate to grant the noble men of the three Gauls the right to accede to the Senate. His request was granted and an engraved bronze plaque of the speech (the Claudian Tables) was erected in Lugdunum.

==== Nero ====
Nero also took an interest in the city. Citizens of Lugdunum contributed four million sesterces to the recovery after the Great Fire of Rome in 64 AD. A few years later, Nero contributed four million sesterces to the rebuilding of Lugdunum after a similarly devastating fire. Although the destructiveness of the fire is described in a letter from Seneca to Lucilius, archeologists have not been able to uncover a confirmatory layer of ash.

==== Galba and the Year of the Four Emperors ====
In March 68 AD, a Romanized Aquitainian named Caius Julius Vindex, governor of Gallia Lugdunensis, led an uprising intended to replace Nero with Galba, a Roman governor of Spain. The citizens of Vienne, however, responded more enthusiastically to the uprising than those of Lugdunum, most of whom remained loyal to Nero. A small force from Vienne briefly besieged Lugdunum, but withdrew when Vindex was defeated by the Rhine legions a few weeks later at Vesontio. Despite the defeat of Vindex, rebellion grew. Nero committed suicide in June and Galba was proclaimed emperor. Galba, who punished some of Nero's supporters in Lugdunum by confiscating their property.

In another turnabout for Lugdunum, Galba's policies were immediately unpopular, and in January AD 69 , the Rhine legions quickly threw their support to Vitellius as emperor. They arrived at friendly Lugdunum, where they were persuaded by the Lyonnais to punish nearby Vienne. Vienne quickly laid down weapons and paid a "ransom" to forestall plundering. Meanwhile, Vitellius arrived in Lugdunum, where, according to Tacitus, he formally declared himself Imperator, punished unreliable soldiers, and celebrated with feasts, and with games in the amphitheater. Fortunately for Lugdunum, the would-be emperor and his army hurried into Italy, defeated Otho, and was in turn defeated by Vespasian and the army of the East, bringing the chaos of the Year of the Four Emperors to an end. Under Vespasian, the city briefly resumed production of bronze coinage, ending a shortage in the money supply that had developed in the previous years.

==== Flavian and Antonine emperors ====
Roman emperors rarely visited Lugdunum after the events of AD 69, and yet it prospered until the Battle of Lugdunum brought devastation in AD 197 .

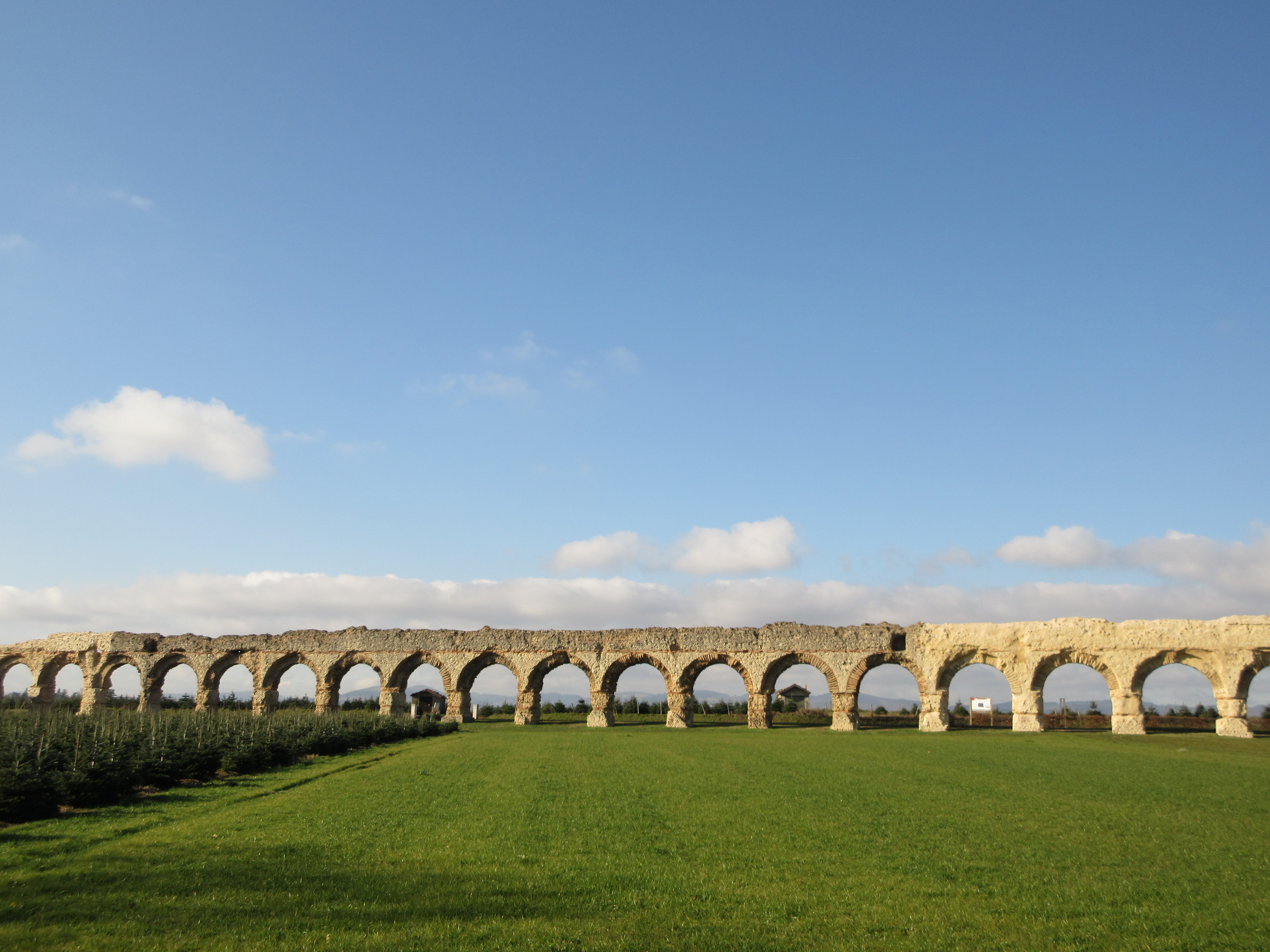

== Christianity and the martyrs of 177 ==
The cosmopolitan hospitality to eastern religions may have allowed the first attested Christian community in Gaul to be established in Lugdunum in the 2nd century, led by a bishop Pothinus—who probably was Greek. In 177 it also became the first in Gaul to suffer persecution and martyrdom.

The event was described in a letter from the Christians in Lugdunum to counterparts in Asia, later retrieved and preserved by Eusebius. There is no record of a cause or a triggering event but mob violence against the Christians in the streets culminated in a public interrogation in the forum by the tribune and town magistrates. The Christians publicly confessed their faith and were imprisoned until the arrival of Legate of Lugdonensis, who gave his authority to the persecution. About 40 of the Christians were savagely martyred—tortured, dying in prison, beheaded, or killed by beasts in the arena as a public spectacle. Among the latter were Bishop Pothinus, Blandina, Doctor Attalus, Ponticus, and the deacon Sanctus of Vienne. Their ashes were thrown into the Rhône.

Nevertheless, the Christian community either survived or was reconstituted, and under Bishop Irenaeus it continued to grow in size and influence.

== Battle of Lugdunum ==
The 2nd century ended with another struggle for imperial succession. The emperor Pertinax was murdered in 193, and four generals again "contended for the purple". Two of the rivals, Clodius Albinus and Septimius Severus, initially formed a political alliance. Albinus was a former legate of Britannia and commanded legions in Britain and Gaul. Septimius Severus commanded the Pannonian legions, and led them successfully against Didius Julianus near Rome in 193, and defeated Pescennius Niger in 194. Severus consolidated his power in Rome and broke his alliance with Albinus. The Senate supported Severus and declared Albinus a public enemy.

Clodius Albinus had settled with his army near Lugdunum early in 195. There, he had himself proclaimed Augustus and made plans to counter Severus. Albinus reopened the mint at Lugdunum, for the first time in over a century, issuing coins celebrating his "clemency", as well as one dedicated to the "Genius of Lugdunum." He was joined by an army under Lucius Novius Rufus, the governor of Hispania Tarraconensis. They successfully attacked the German troops of Virius Lupus but were unable to deter them from supporting Severus.

Severus brought his army from Italy and Germany toward the end of 196. The armies fought an initial, inconclusive engagement at Tinurtium (Tournus), about 60 km (35 miles) up the Saône from Lugdunum. Albinus retreated with his forces toward Lugdunum.

On 19 February 197, Severus again attacked Clodius Albinus to the northwest of the city. Albinus' army was defeated in the bloody and decisive Battle of Lugdunum. Dio Cassius described 300,000 men involved in the battle: although this was one of the largest battles involving Roman armies known, this number is assumed to be an exaggeration. Albinus committed suicide in a house near the Rhône; his head was sent to Rome as a warning to his supporters. His defeated cohorts were dissolved and the victorious legions punished those in Lugdunum who had supported Albinus, by confiscation, banishment, or execution. The city was plundered or at least severely damaged by the battle. Legio I Minervia remained camped in Lugdunum from 198 to 211.

== Late antiquity ==
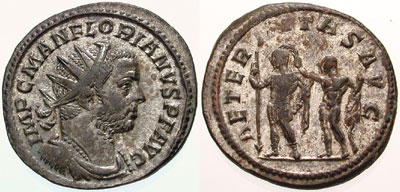
Antoninianus struck by Florianus in 276 AD at the reopened Lugdunum mint

When mints began to be set up outside Rome after 260 AD, there was a Gallic mint which may have been located at Lugdunum, but more likely at Trier, which was definitely the mint of the Gallic Empire. Aurelian transferred minting from Trier to Lugdunum in 274 AD; it was the sole mint for the western empire.

A major reorganization of imperial administration begun at the end of the 3rd century during the reign of Diocletian and completed a few decades later by Constantine further reduced the importance of Lugdunum. This reorganization standardized size and status of provinces, splitting many of the larger. The new provinces were grouped in larger administrative districts. Lugdunum became the capital of a much smaller region containing only two cities besides Lugdunum: Autun and Langres. The new governor bore the title of consularis. The mint was retained at Lugdunum, as was an administrative tax office and a state-run wool clothing factory.

Although the Western Roman Empire persisted until 476 AD, the border regions extending along the Rhine River in Germany to the Danube River in Dacia became far more important from a military and strategic standpoint. Cities like Augusta Treverorum (Trier) eclipsed Lugdunum in importance. The status of the western provinces declined further when Constantine made Byzantium (later named Constantinople after his death) the capital of the Eastern part of the Empire. As the Western Empire disintegrated in the 5th century, Lugdunum became the principal city of the Kingdom of the Burgundians in 443 AD. The Lugdunum mint remained in operation under the new rulers.

== See also ==
- History of Lyon
- Abascantus
- Lyon cup
- List of Roman sites

== Sources ==
- Cassius Dio. Roman History. XLVI, 50.
- André Pelletier. Histoire de Lyon: de la capitale les Gaules à la métropole européene. Editions Lyonnaises d'Art et d'Histoire. Lyon: 2004. ISBN 2-84147-150-0
- Seneca. Apocolocyntosis. VII.
- Whitehead, Kenneth D. (n.d.). "Witnesses of the Passion". Touchstone: A Journal of Mere Christianity.
