= Parc des Hauteurs =

Park in Lyon, France

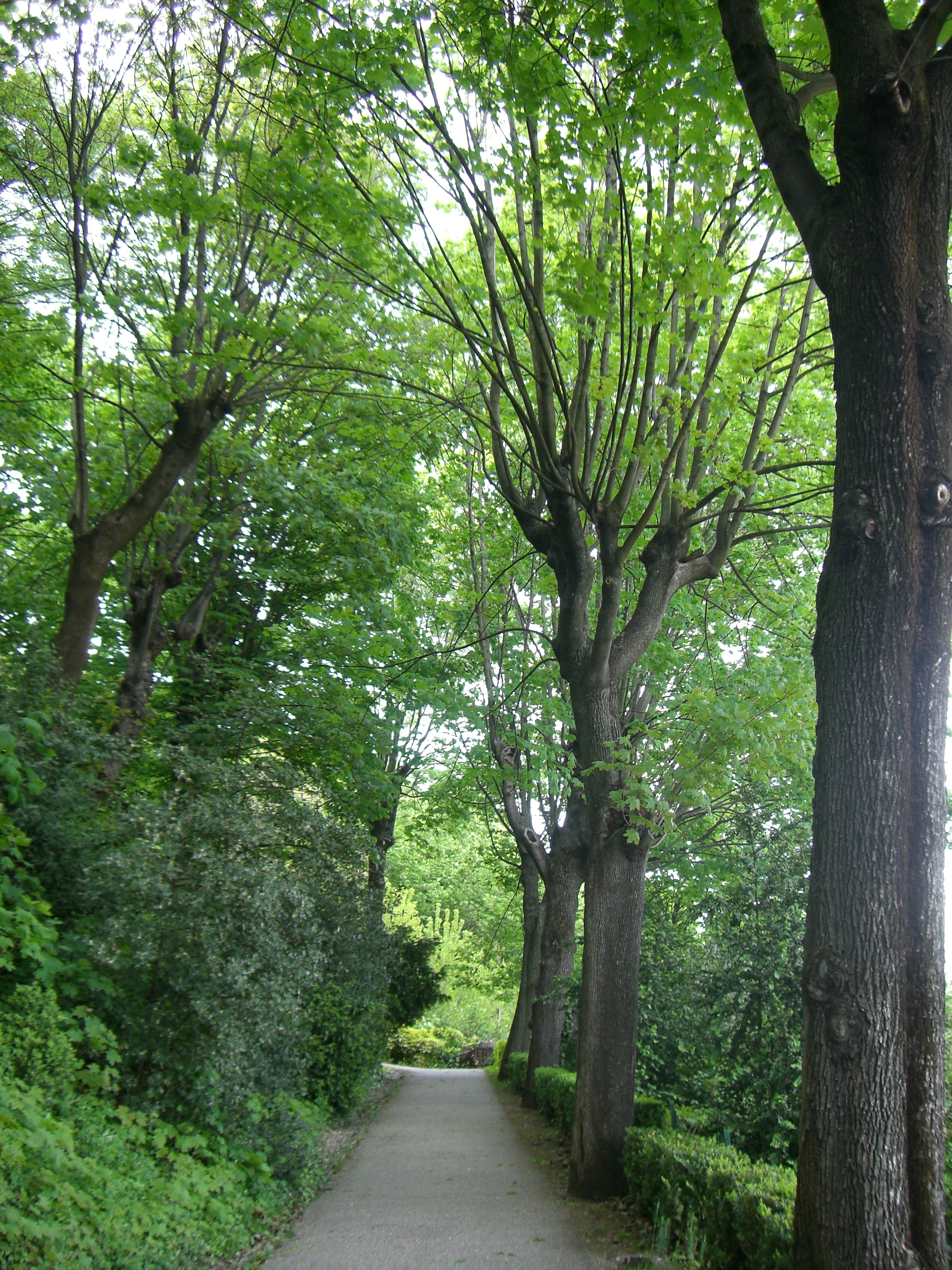
- Rose garden
- Interactive map of Parc des Hauteurs
- Type: Urban park
- Location: Fourvière, 5th arrondissement of Lyon, Lyon
- Coordinates: 45.7627°N 4.8237°E
- Area: 1,300 square metres (14,000 sq ft)
- Created: 1993
- Website: www.lyon.fr/page/cadre-de-vie/ville-nature/le-parc-des-hauteurs-et-jardins-du-rosaire.html

Parc des Hauteurs (French pronunciation: [paʁk de otœʁ], lit. 'Heights Park') is an urban park on Fourvière hill in Lyon, France. It encompasses the public spaces between the basilique de Fourvière and Loyasse cemetery.

== History ==
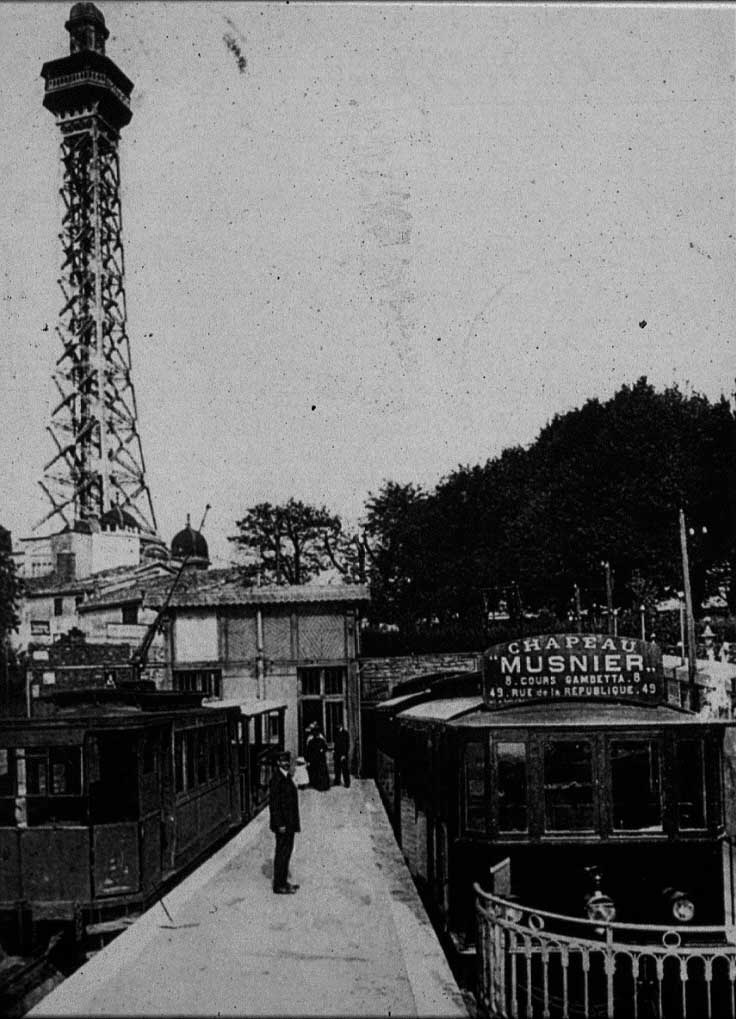
Connection between the funicular and the tramway in Fourvière

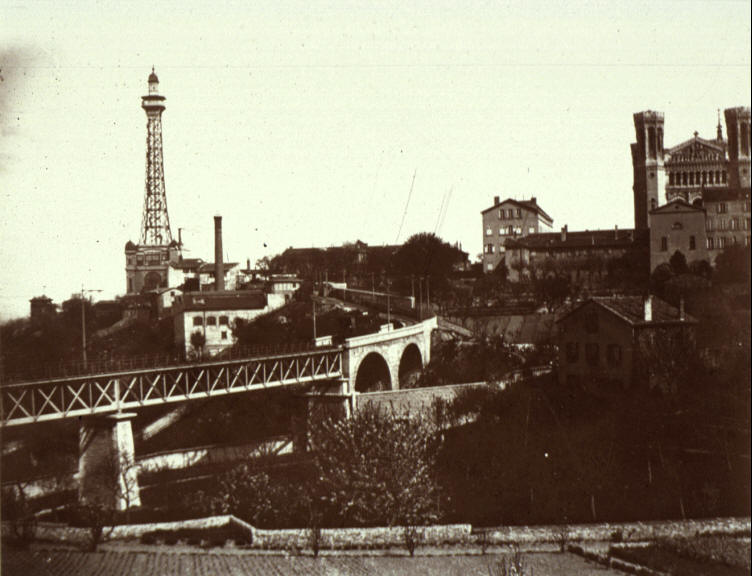
Quatre-Vents pedestrian bridge in 1910

Throughout the 20th century, urban planning documents mention various projects for Fourvière hill. In 1906, architect Sined suggested building a park on the hill to remedy the shortage of parks in Lyon. In 1924 Camille Chalumeau suggested building a circular boulevard to take advantage of the panoramic views from the sight. After a landslide killed 39 people in 1930, construction on the hill was banned. Afterwards, there were several proposals to build a park, including by architect Giroud. He proposed the creation of a vast urban park between place Saint-Jean and the basilique Notre-Dame de Fourvière. Between 1930 and 1950 the Théâtre antique de Fourvière and the Odéon Antique were uncovered, after which the city acquired the lands in the area. The archaeological park was created and several buildings were destroyed to improve access to the hill.

The Renaissance association of Vieux-Lyon was created in 1958 and has served to protect the area since 1964.

== Features ==
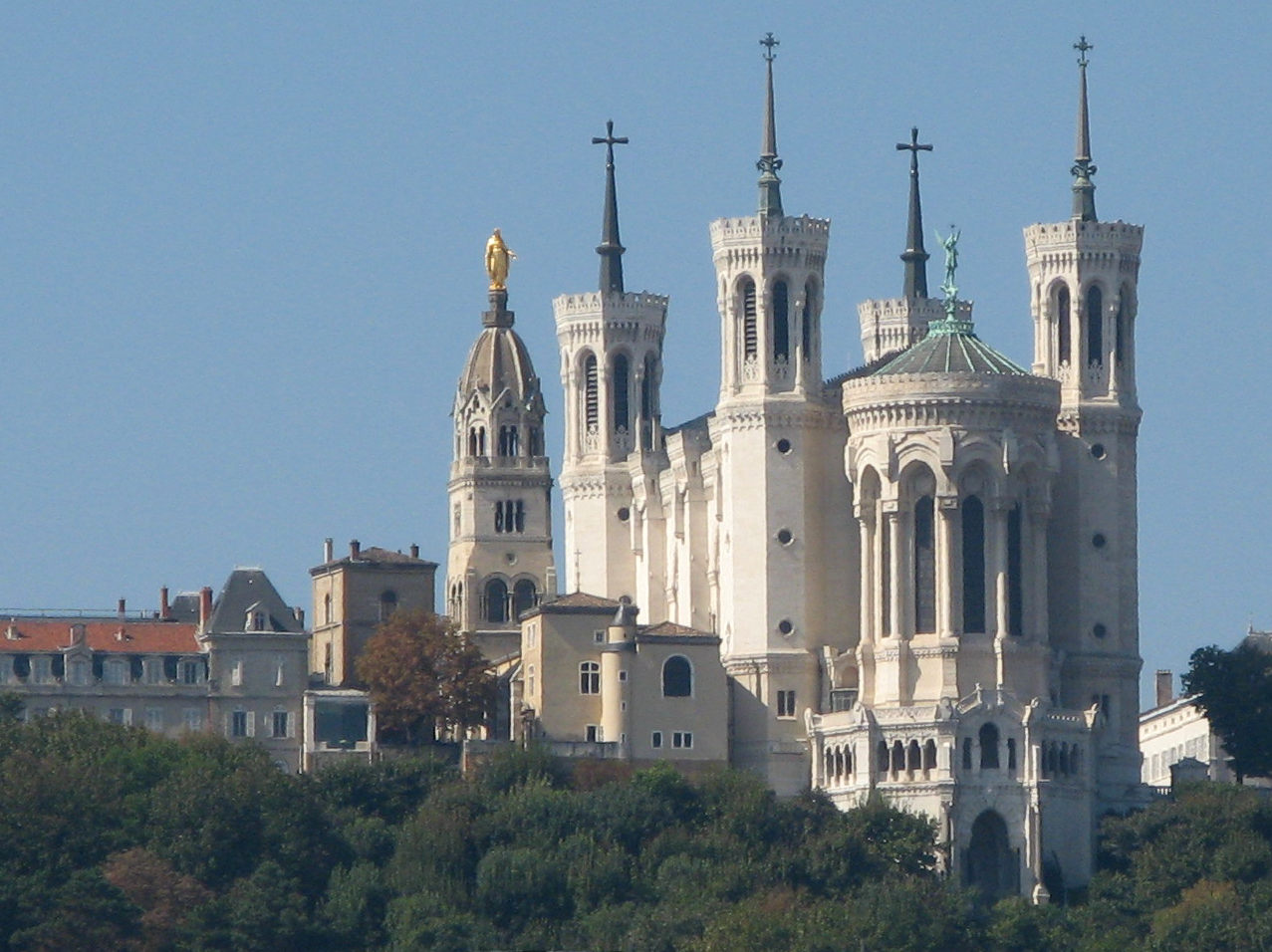
Basilique Notre-Dame de Fourvière, as seen from the beginning of the garden paths

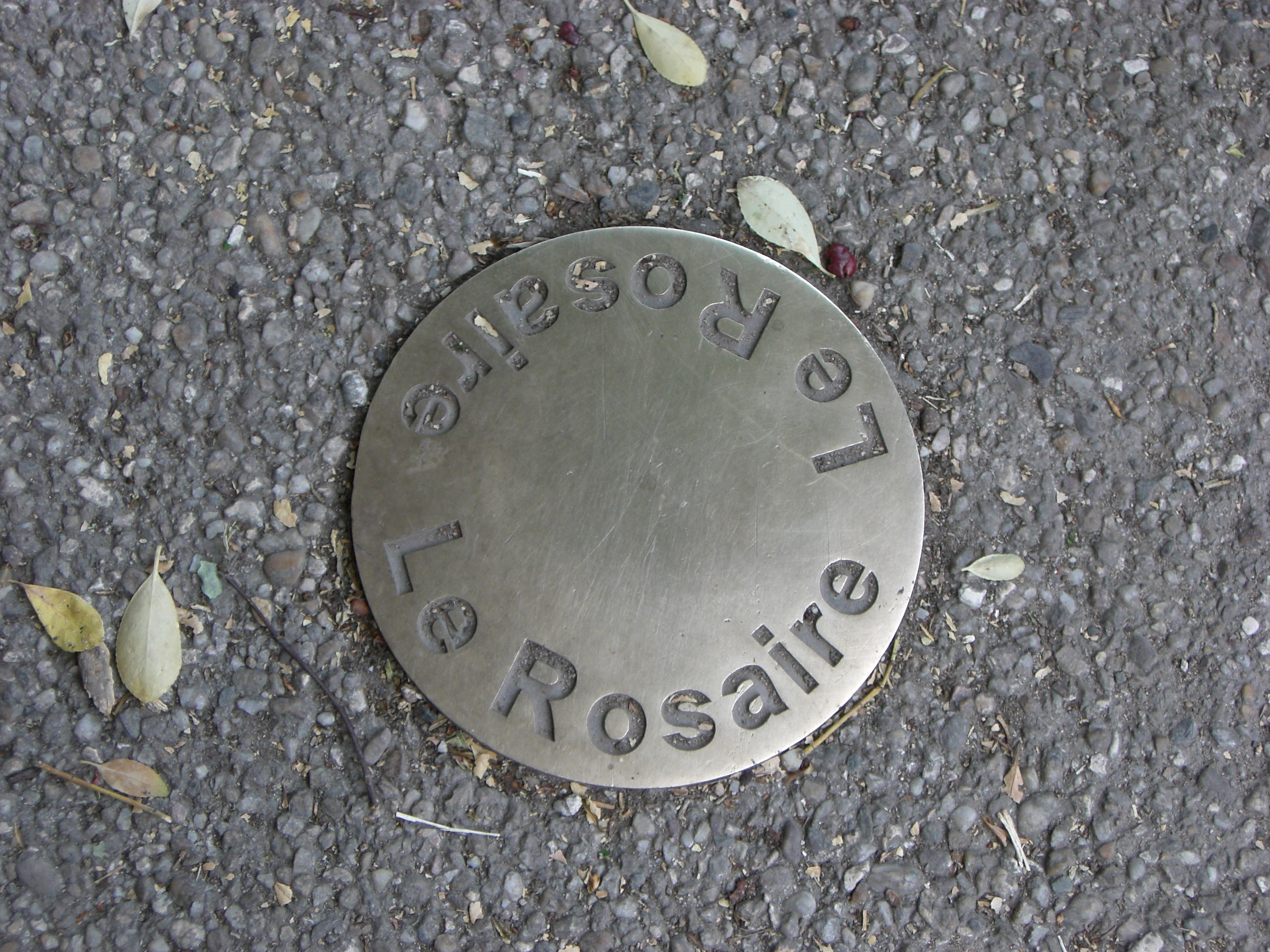
A marker on the ground in the rose garden

The esplanade of Fourvière, created by the engineer Joannès Blanchon between 1880 and 1896, connects the Passerelle des Quatre-vents, the Loyasse fort and the Loyasse cemetery, the Jardin de la Visitation, the Parc archéologique and the Jardin du Rosaire (rose garden).

=== Passerelle des Quatre-vents ===
This footpath was planned by the landscapers Desvigne and Dalnoky. It connects the funicular of Saint-Paul to Fourvière and the Loyasse cemetery. It is 80 meters high and was designed by architect Manuelle Gautrand and engineer Marc Malinowski.

=== Loyasse cemetery ===
The park contains the Loyasse cemetery, which was built in 1807.

=== Jardin de la Visitation ===
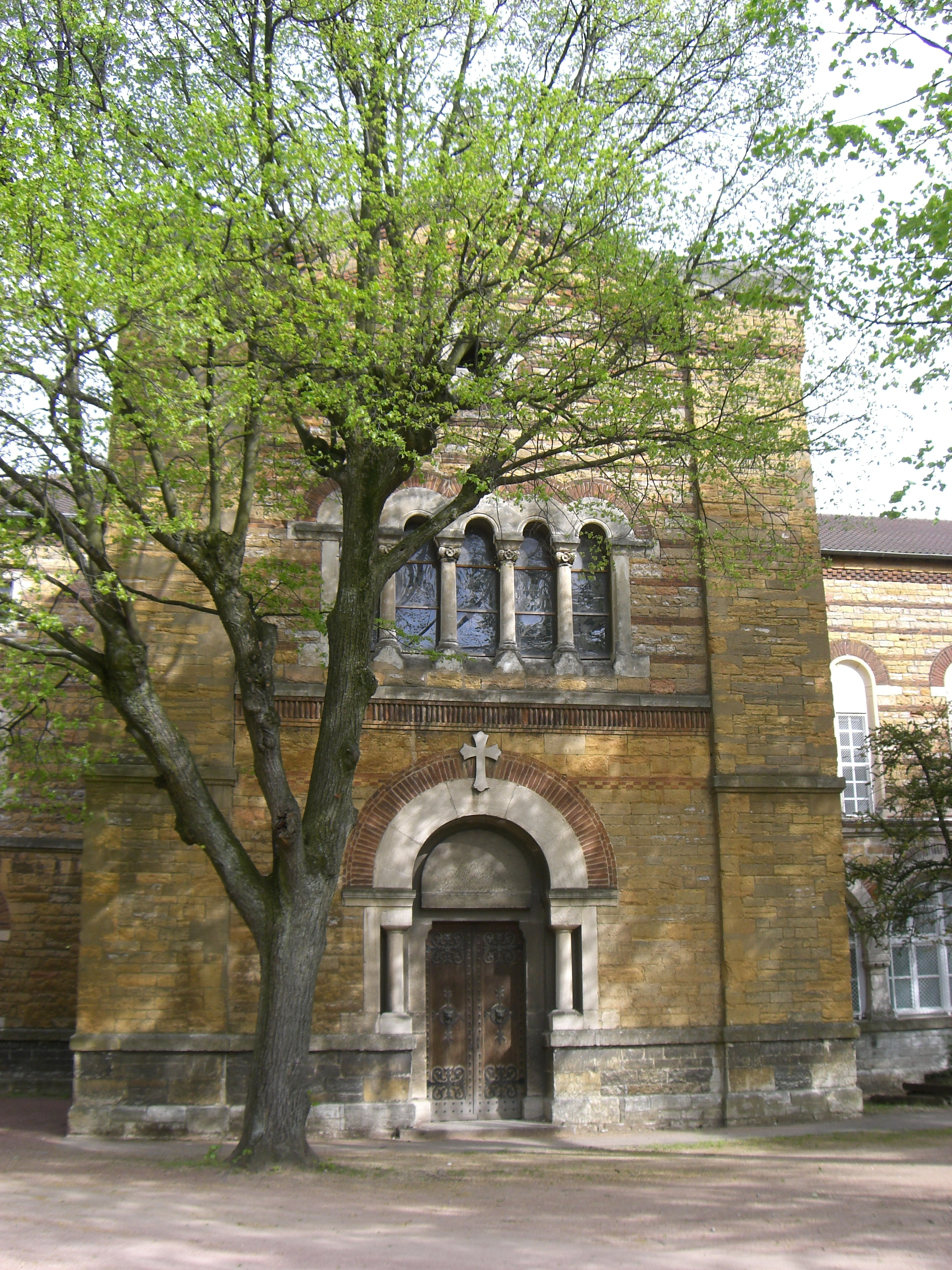
The archives of the Hospices civils de Lyon: the church was built in 1854

The "chemin de la Visitation", is a 2-kilometre (1.2 mi) path that connects rue Pauline Jaricot to the upper part of Parc archéologique. The cloister, convent of the Visitation Sainte Marie de Fourvière is one of the first works of Pierre-Marie Bossan. It was built from 1854 to 1857, and was in use by the church until 1968. It has been transformed into a hotel, with the chapel now being used as the reception hall of the hotel, while the cloister was converted into hotel lounges.

=== Parc archéologique ===
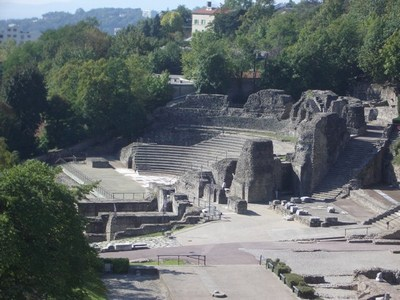
Ancient Theatre of Fourvière

After the Jardin de la Visitation, a narrow path leads to the top of the ancient odeon. The path then passes between the odeon and the ancient theater by a staircase that leads to a Roman road. The Jardin du Rosaire is one hundred meters to the north.

=== Jardin du Rosaire ===
The basilica and the gardens below, today called the Jardin du Rosaire, were designed by the architect Pierre Bossan in the second half of the 19th century. The gardens were modified in 1993 by Michel Louis and Ingrid Bourne. Private properties were claimed to create paths, terraces and esplanades.

There is a hydrangea garden, the old rose garden and the orchard. An alley winds from the esplanade of the basilica to the montée Saint-Barthélemy. This is also the location of the house of Bréda, named Maison de Lorette after being purchased by Pauline Jaricot, and the Chapelle Sainte-Philomène, which was constructed by Antoine-Marie Chenavard in 1839. The Maison de la Bréda, the chapel and the garden have been classified as monuments historiques since 2004.

== See also ==
- Parks in Lyon

== Bibliography ==
- Delfante, Charles (1994). 100 ans d'urbanisme à Lyon (in French). LUGD. p. 235. ISBN 2-84147-004-0.
- Autran, Stéphane (2004). Les infrastructures vertes à l'épreuve des plans d'urbanisme – L'agglomération lyonnaise, la construction d'une stratégie (in French). CERTU. p. 319. ISBN 2-11-094125-1.
