= Église Saint-Georges de Lyon =

Church in Lyon, France

Église Saint-Georges
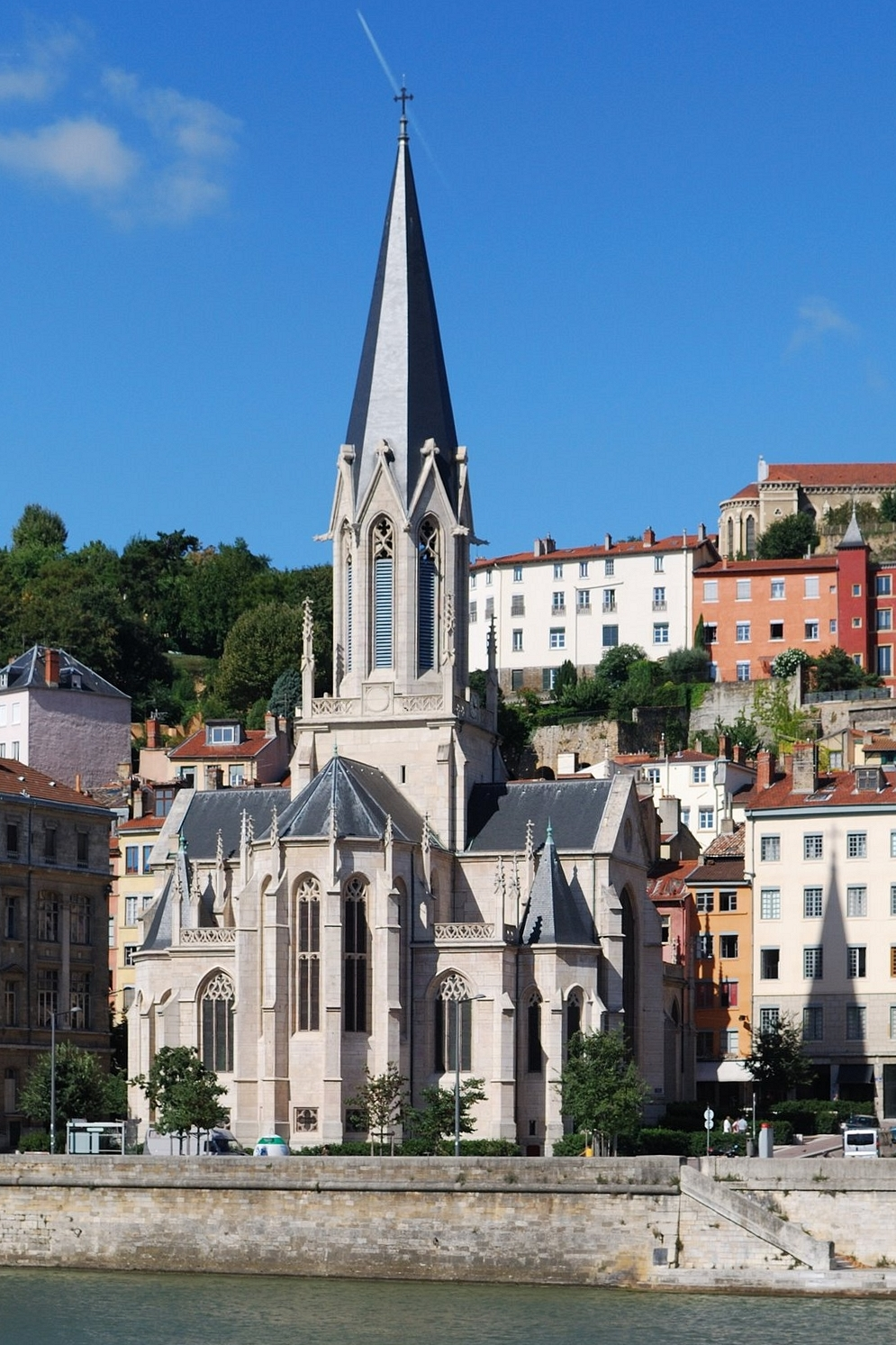
- The church viewed from the left bank of the Saône

Religion
- Affiliation: Roman Catholic
- Diocese: 5th arrondissement of Lyon
- Ecclesiastical or organisational status: Church
- Year consecrated: 2012 (Note: Rebuilt in stages from 1844, the church had never been consecrated; Cardinal Philippe Barbarin dedicated it on 11 November 2012.)

Location
- Location: Lyon, France
- Interactive map of Église Saint-Georges
- Coordinates: 45.757672°N 4.825471°E

Architecture
- Architect: Pierre Bossan
- Type: Church
- Style: Gothic Revival architecture
- Completed: 1848
- Monument historique
- Official name: Église Saint-Georges

Website
- eglisesaintgeorges.com

The Église Saint-Georges (Church of St. George) is a Roman Catholic church located on the Place François-Bertras, in the Vieux Lyon quarter, in the 5th arrondissement of Lyon. It is under the direction of the Primatiale parish and was named in honor of Saint George. The cathedral is near the Place Benoît-Crépu, between the quarter of the Quarantaine and Saint-Jean quarters.

== History ==
Around 550, Bishop Sacerdos founded a convent of nuns and a small church dedicated to Saint Eulalia on this site, at the foot of the hill of Saint-Just. It was ruined around 732 during a raid of the Saracens, and restored by Archbishop Leidrade, who placed it under the patronage of Saint George in 802.

The Knights Hospitaller of Saint John of Jerusalem (later known as the Knights of Malta, and today the Sovereign Military Order of Malta), established in Lyon from 1209, settled beside the church in 1315; it remained the parish church while also serving their commandery. In 1492 the commander Humbert de Beauvoir had the church restored and built the house of the commandery, completed in 1498 according to the inscription over its door. The Lange family paid for repairs to the church. The old church was small and low; the commandery stood to its south, on the Saône, flanked by two large towers.

During the Revolution the church was used as a hay barn, and the commandery became national property; it was sold in 1807, ruined by a fire in 1854 and demolished in 1857. The church was restored by the architect Pollet in 1892.

The present church was designed by the architect Pierre Bossan, who also made plans for the basilica of Fourviere, and was rebuilt in stages: the apse, choir, transept and bell tower from 1844 to 1859, and the nave and façade in 1869–1870. Abandoned between the late 1970s and 1989, the church was later assigned by Cardinal Albert Decourtray to the Priestly Fraternity of St. Peter under the Motu proprio Ecclesia Dei, which granted the practice of liturgical books of 1962 in Latin.

The community was given by Cardinal Philippe Barbarin to three priests from the Fraternity of St. Peter, who joined the diocese. On 25 August 2007, Cardinal Barbarin signed the incardination of three of the five priests who served the church. Also in 2007, after repairs to the exterior of the church and adjoining spaces, the inauguration took place in the presence of Cardinal Barbarin and Senator-Mayor of Lyon Gérard Collomb.

== Architecture ==
The church was rebuilt in neogothic style. Architect Pierre Bossan, who also made the furniture, later deemed his work on this church as a "youthful mistake". The sculpture on the facade was made by Charles Dufraine and stained glasses are the artwork of Maréchal de Metz. The building is classified as monument historique.

The tower has a height of 67 meters. A polychrome wooden altarpiece of the sixteenth century shows the coronation of the Virgin.
