= Nuits de Fourvière =

Festival in Lyon

Coordinates: 45°45′33.79″N 4°49′12.6″E

Les Nuits de Fourvière
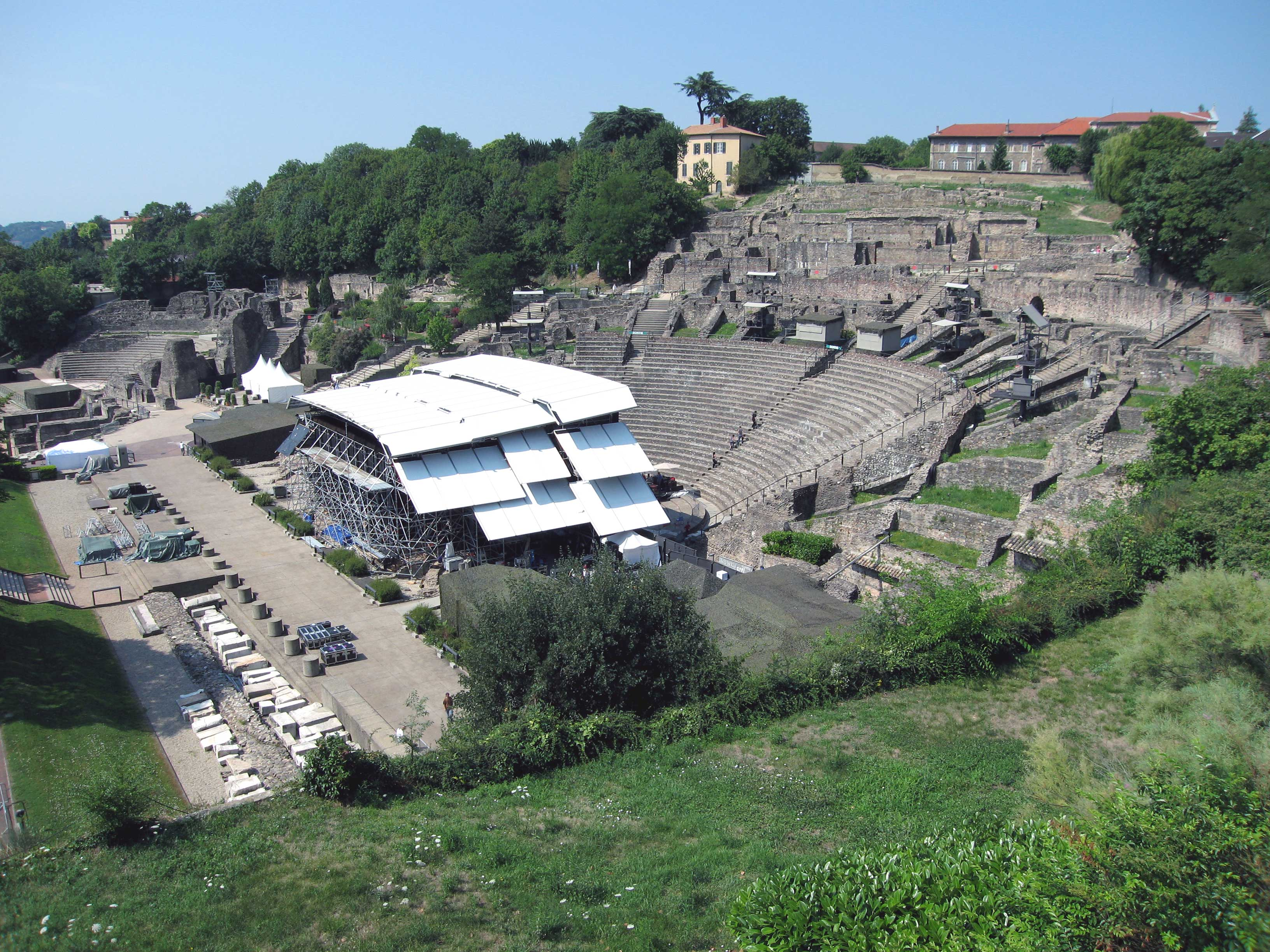
- The large theater during the festival
- Genre: theater; circus; music; dance; film
- Dates: June, July, August
- Locations: The Théâtre antique de Lyon and Odéon de Lyon theaters in Fourvière, Lyon, France
- Years active: 1946–present
- Capacity: 5,600
- Website: www.nuitsdefourviere.com/en

The Nuits de Fourvière (Nights of Fourvière) is a festival with theater, circus, music, dance, and film presentations. The festival has taken place every summer since 1946 in the Théâtre antique de Fourvière, and in the Odéon de Lyon (since 1952) in the 5th arrondissement near the Basilique Notre-Dame de Fourvière.

The festival was first managed by the Charbonnières-les-Bains casino, then by the Rhône department starting in the early 1990s. Since 1 January 2005 it has been managed by Grand Lyon.

Spectators throwing seat cushions toward the stage after a performance by The Pixies in 2016

It is tradition for spectators to throw their seat cushions toward the stage at the end of the performance to show their appreciation.

== Venues ==
- Théâtre antique de Lyon: 2600–4400 seats depending on the configuration
- Odéon de Lyon: 900–1200 seats depending on the configuration

== Attendance ==
- 2004: 78,684
- 2005: 87,311
- 2006: 97,583
- 2007: 107,944
- 2008: 105,904
- 2009: 117,788
- 2010: 121,221
- 2011: 133,408
- 2012: 134,727
- 2013: 157,684
- 2014: 142,000
- 2015: 191,000
- 2016: 136,000

== See also ==
- Fête des lumières
- List of music festivals in France
