= Metallic tower of Fourvière =

Landmark in Lyon, France

Coordinates: 45°45′49.57″N 4°49′20.16″E

The tower in 2026, seen from the Presqu'île.

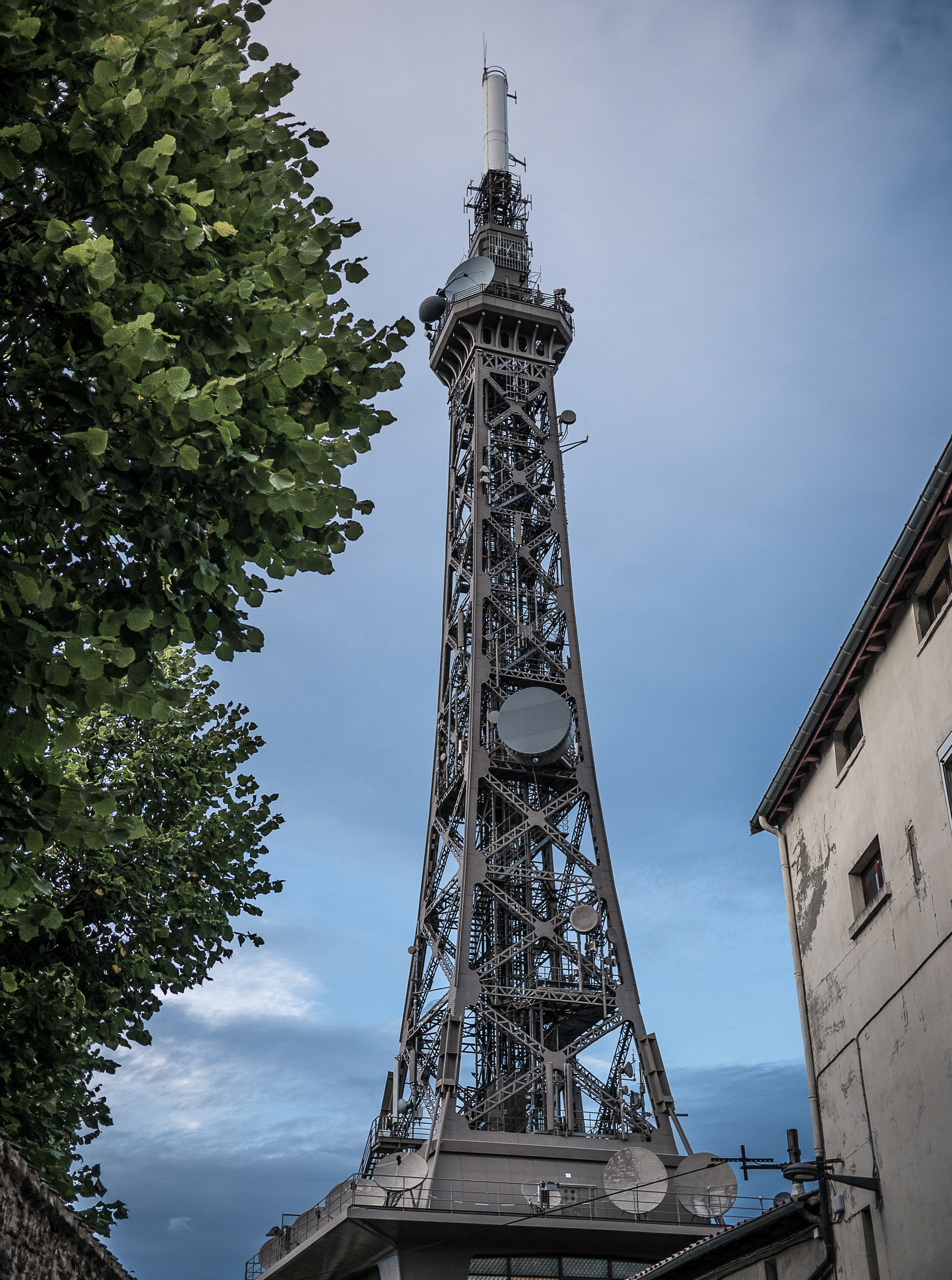

The Tour métallique de Fourvière ("Metallic tower of Fourvière"), a landmark of Lyon, France, is a steel framework tower which bears a striking resemblance to the Eiffel Tower, which predates it by three years. With a height of 101 m (331 ft), previously 85.9 m (282 ft) before installation of the TV broadcasting antenna, and weighing 210 tons, the "metallic tower" was built between 1892 and 1894.

During the Exposition universelle of 1914 in Lyon it had a restaurant and an elevator capable of taking 22 people up to the summit. Although used as an observation tower until November 1, 1953, nowadays it serves as a television tower and is not accessible to the public. At 372 metres (1,220 ft), it is the highest point in Lyon.

== Broadcasting stations ==
=== FM-radio ===
Programme	Frequency is euros	ERP
France Inter	87.75 MHz	2 kW
Regional	91.05 MHz	2 kW
France Culture	94.0 MHz	3 kW
France Musique	98.0 MHz	2 kW

=== TV ===
Programme	Channel-Number	Frequency	ERP
M6	22	479.25 MHz	10 kW
TLM	25	503.25 MHz	10 kW
France 5	28	527.25 MHz	10 kW
France 2	58	767.25 MHz	10 kW
TF1	61	791.25 MHz	10 kW
France 3	64	815.25 MHz	10 kW

== See also ==
- Fourvière
- Lattice tower
- List of towers

== Gallery ==
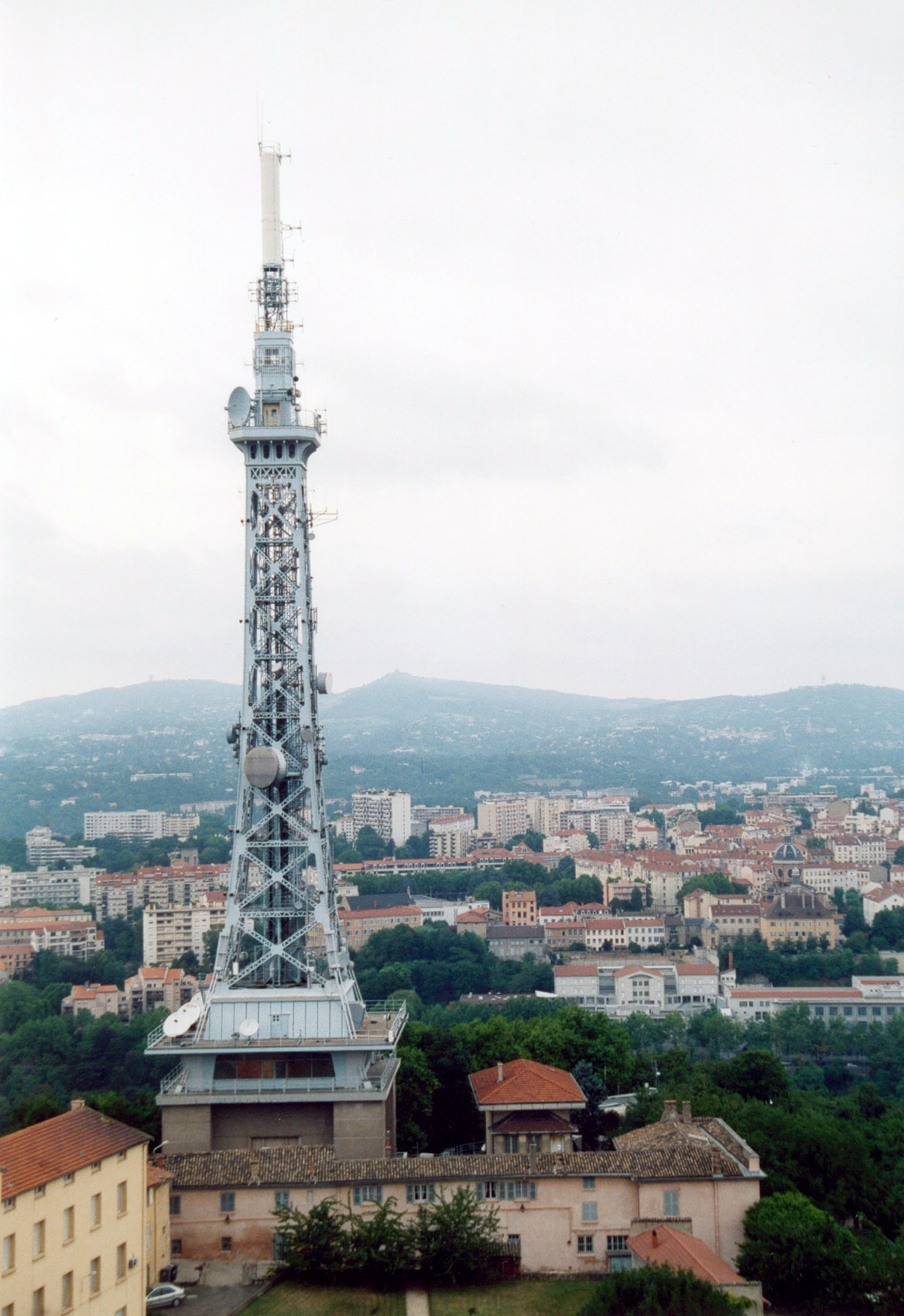
Tour métallique de Fourvière

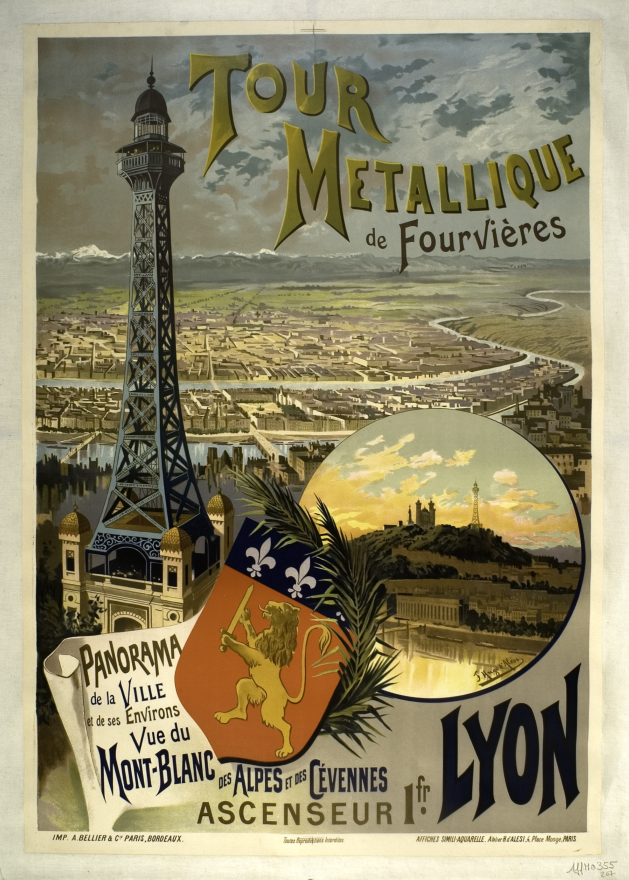
Poster advertising elevator

The tower at night (2026).
