= Pierre Bossan =

French architect

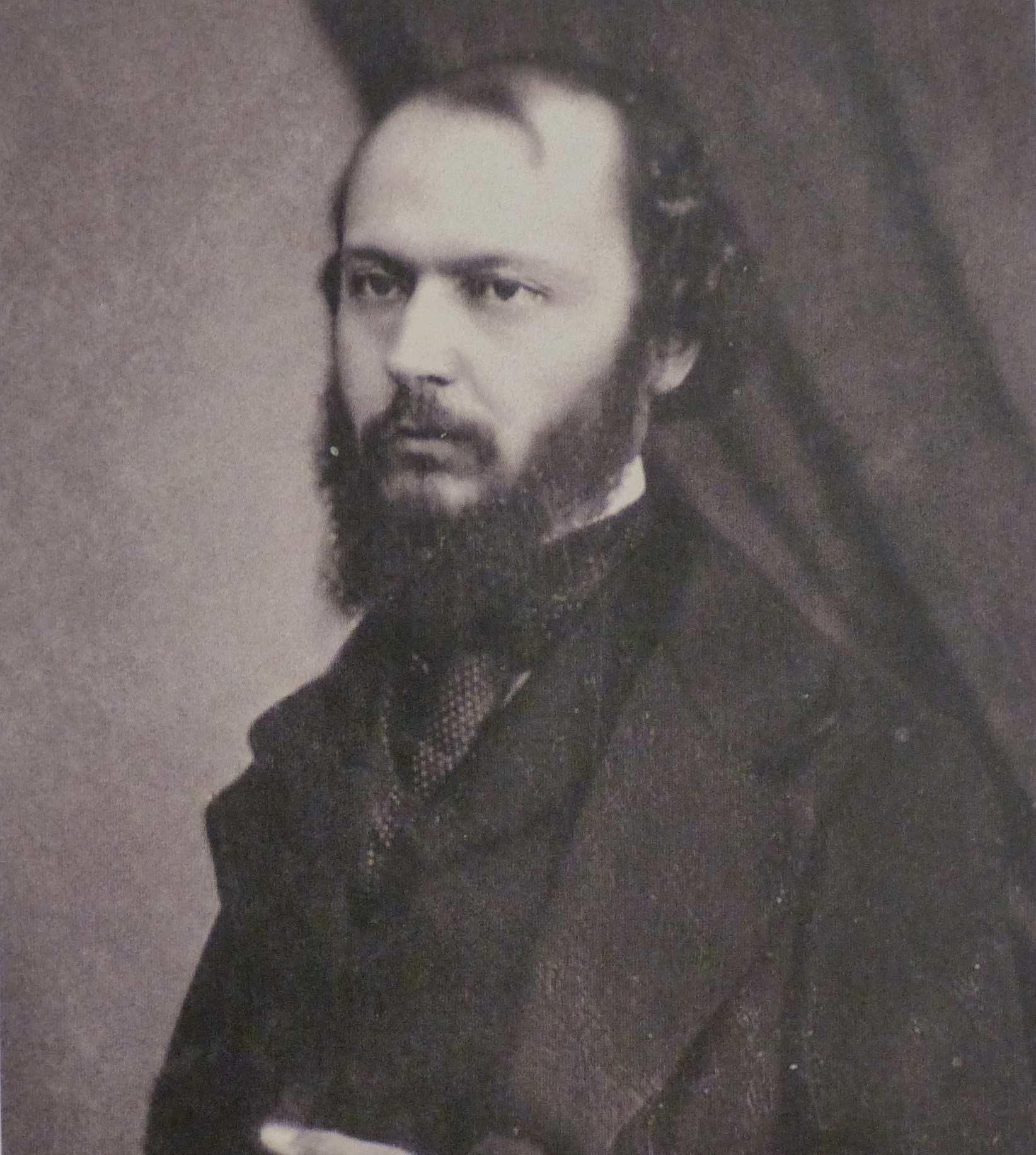
Pierre Bossan (date unknown)

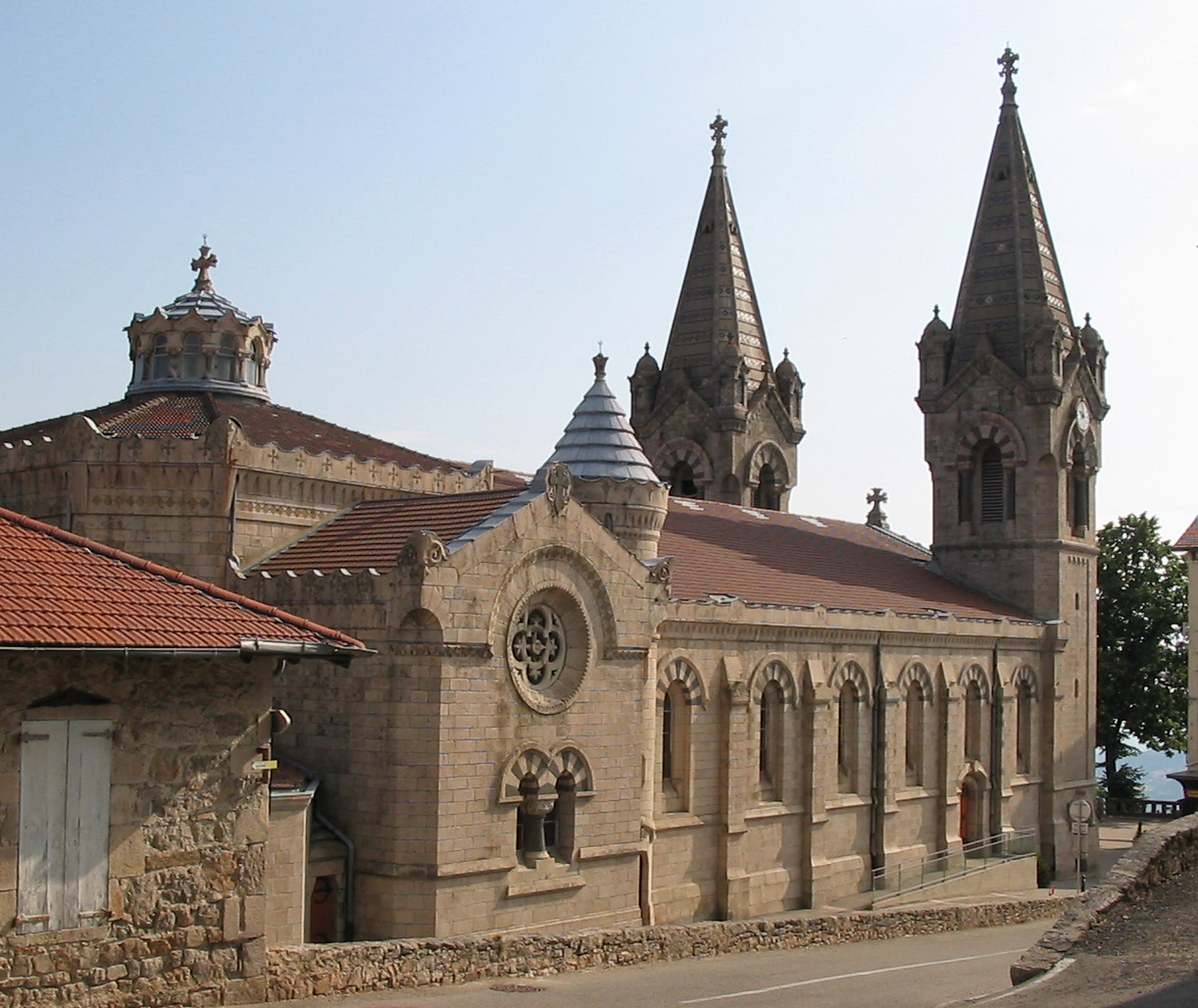
Basilique Saint-Régis de Lalouvesc

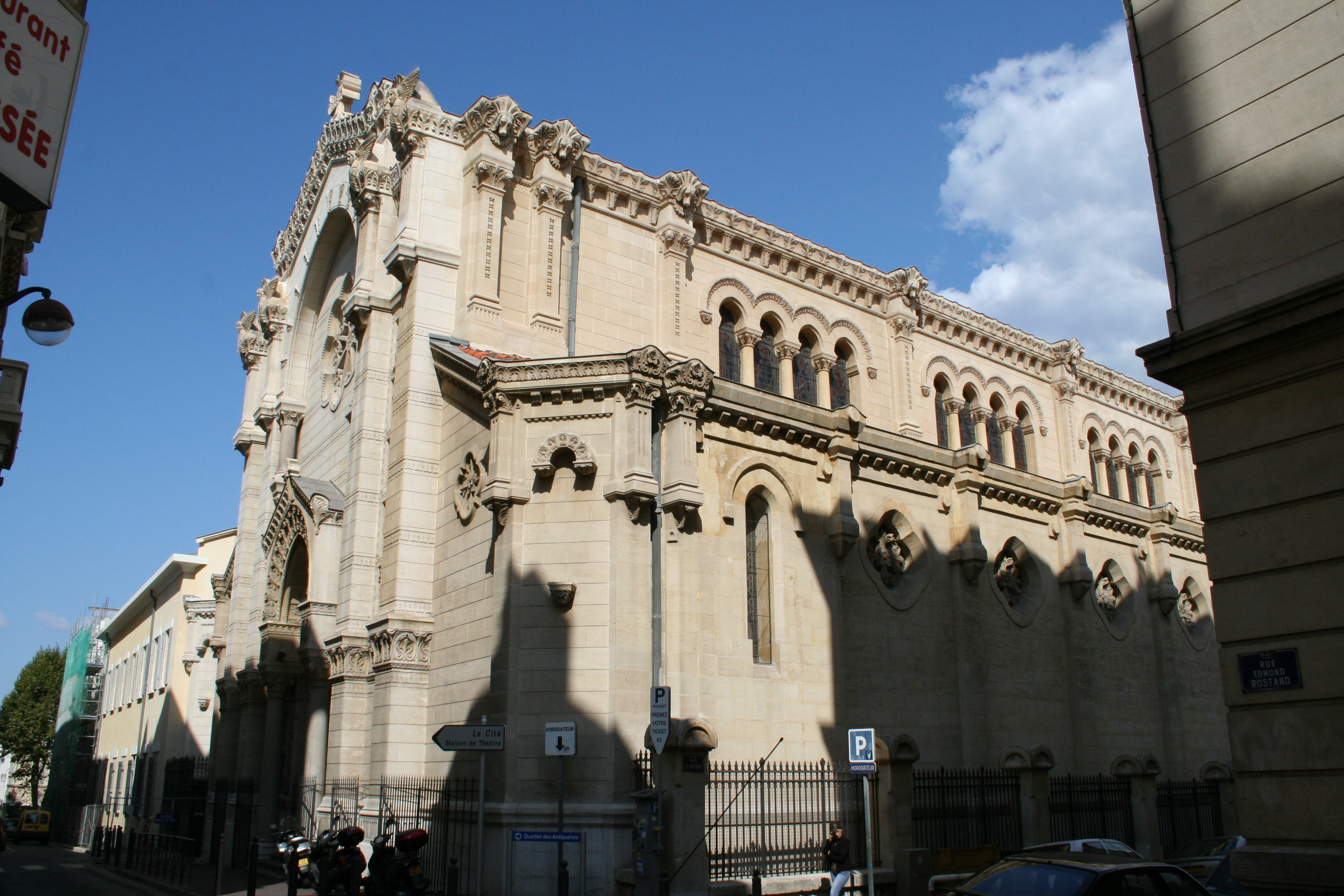
Couvent Saint-Lazare de Marseille

Pierre-Marie Bossan (23 July 1814, in Lyon – 23 July 1888, in La Ciotat) was a French historicist architect, a pupil of Henri Labrouste, specialising in ecclesiastical architecture.

== Life and work ==
In 1844 he was appointed architect to the diocese of Lyon, where his major work was the neo-Byzantine basilica of Notre-Dame de Fourvière (1872–84), on a height dominating Lyon. He also designed Lyon's Église Saint-Georges, an extension to the parish church at Ars-sur-Formans (1862–65) and churches at Régny, Neulise and Couzon-au-Mont-d'Or (1854–56), as well as the pilgrimage basilica of La Louvesc (1865) in the department of Ardèche, Dauphiné.

There are funerary monuments designed by Bossan at Valence.

He is buried in the Cimetière de Loyasse, Lyon.

=== Selected works ===
- 1854–56: Cloister of the Visitandines, Lyon
- About 1855: Maison Blanchon, quai Fulchiron, Lyon. A house in Moorish taste
- 1858–62: Église de l'Immaculée-Conception, Lyon
- completed 1859: Petit séminaire de Meximieux (Ain), today the Hôtel de Ville
- 1862–65 Basilica at Ars-sur-Formans, département de l'Ain
- completed 1865: Église Sainte-Anne, Lyon. Unifinished; closed in 1938 and demolished 1939
- completed 1865: Église Saint-Maurice, Echallon
- 1867: Construction begun on the parish church of Régnié-Durette, département of the Rhône; the structure was completed in 1895, after his death
- 1872: Construction begun on Notre-Dame de Fourvière, Lyon. Inaugurated in 1896

== See also ==
- Parc des Hauteurs
