= Odeon (building) =

Ancient concert hall for performances and competitions

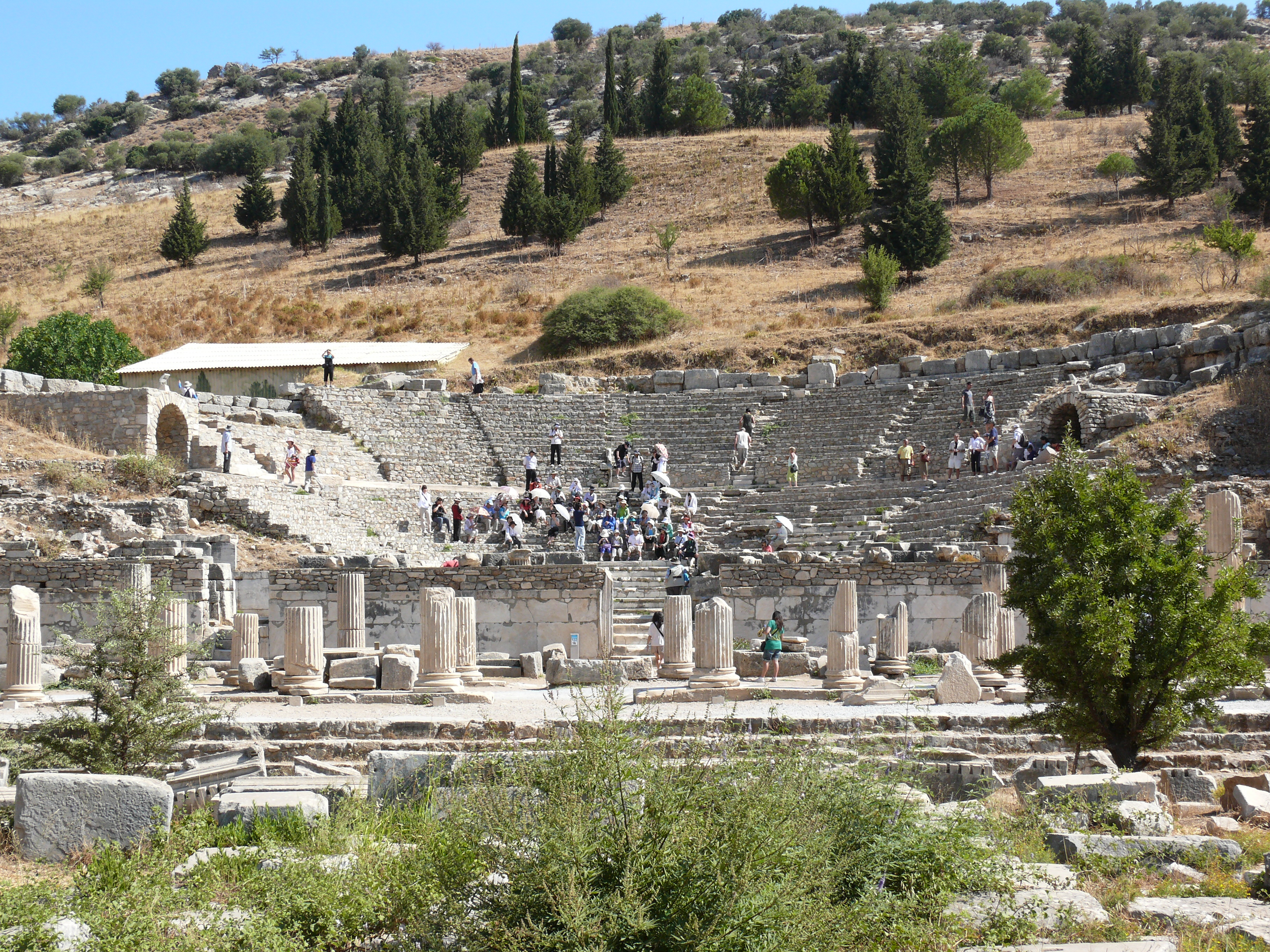
The Odeon of Ephesus, Turkey

An odeon (Note: Also written odeion or oideion.) or odeum (from Ancient Greek: ᾠδεῖον, romanized: ōideîon, lit. 'singing place'; Latin: ōdēum) is a type of ancient Greek and Roman building used for musical activities such as singing, musical shows, and poetry competitions. These structures were typically smaller than Greek and Roman theatres and had a roof for better acoustics.

== Etymology ==
The ancient Greek word ᾠδεῖον comes from the verb ἀείδω (aeidō, "I sing") which is also the root of ᾠδή (ōidē, "ode") and of ἀοιδός (aoidos, "singer").

== Description ==
Generally, the construction of an odeon was similar to that of an ancient Greek theatre and Roman theatre, but it was smaller in size (with some exceptions, such as the Odeon of Herodes Atticus) and was provided with a roof for acoustic purposes, a characteristic difference. The prototype odeon was the Odeon of Pericles (Odeon of Athens), a mainly wooden building constructed in 435 BC by Pericles at the southeastern foot of the Acropolis of Athens. It was described by Plutarch as "many-seated and many-columned" and may have been square, though excavations have also suggested a different shape, 208 ft × 62 ft (63 m × 19 m). It was said to be decorated with the masts and spars of ships captured from the Persians. It was rebuilt by king Ariobarzanes I of Cappadocia after its destruction by fire in the First Mithridatic War in 87–86 BC.

== Examples ==
=== Ancient Greece ===
The oldest known odeon in Greece was the Skias at Sparta, so-called from its resemblance to the top of an umbrella, said to have been erected by Theodorus of Samos (600 BC). In Athens, an odeon near the spring Enneacrunus on the Ilissus was referred to the age of Peisistratus and appears to have been rebuilt or restored by Lycurgus (c. 330 BC). Also in Athens, the Odeon of Agrippa was a large odeon located in the centre of the ancient Agora of Athens.

The most magnificent odeon was the Odeon of Herodes Atticus on the Southwest cliff of the Acropolis at Athens. It was built in about 160 AD by the wealthy sophist and rhetorician Herodes Atticus in memory of his wife, and considerable remains of the odeon still exist. It had accommodation for 4500–5500 persons, and the ceiling was constructed of beautifully carved beams of cedar wood, probably with an open space in the center to admit the light. It was also profusely decorated with pictures and other works of art. Similar buildings also existed in other parts of Greece: at Corinth, also the gift of Herodes Atticus; at Patrae, where there was a famous statue of Apollo; at Smyrna, Tralles, and other towns in Asia Minor.

=== Ancient Rome ===
The first odeon in Rome was built by Domitian (Odeon of Domitian), a second by Trajan. In Sicily, there are at least two Roman odeons, one at Catania and another at Taormina.

The Odeon of Philippopolis (present day Plovdiv, Bulgaria), with 300 to 350 seats, and the Odeon of Lyon are other examples.

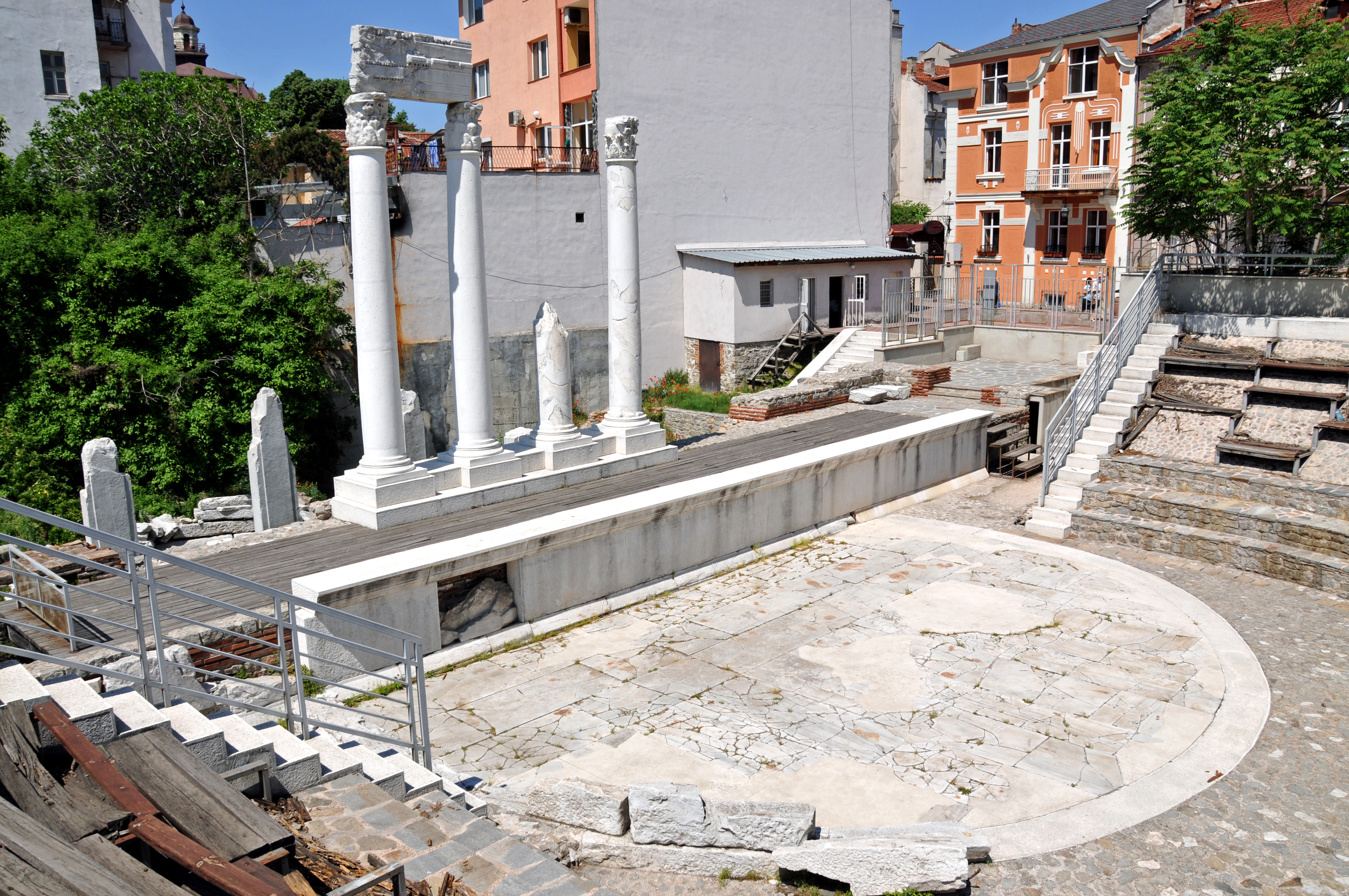
Roman Odeon, Philippopolis, Bulgaria

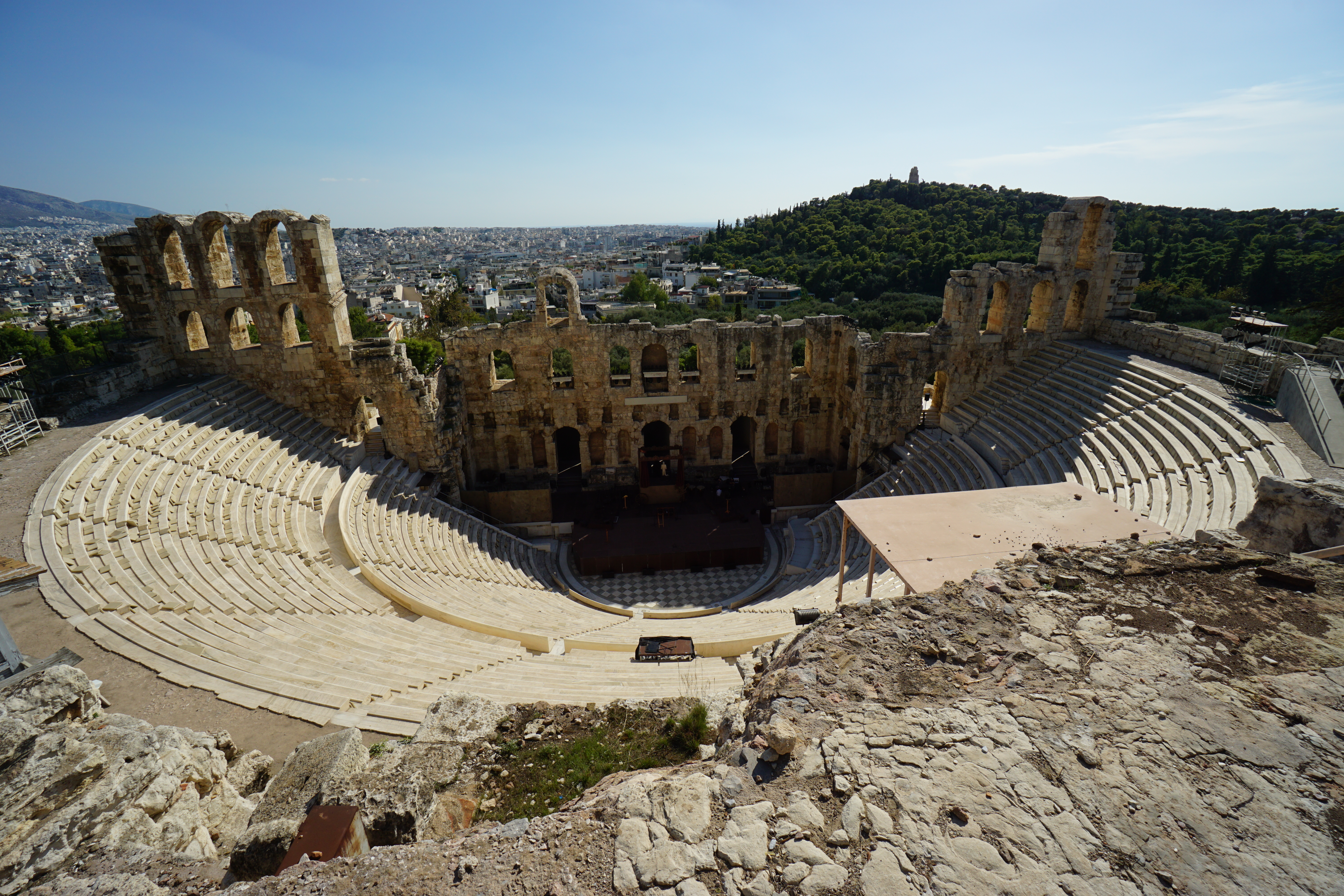
View of the Odeon of Herodes Atticus from the Acropolis of Athens, Greece

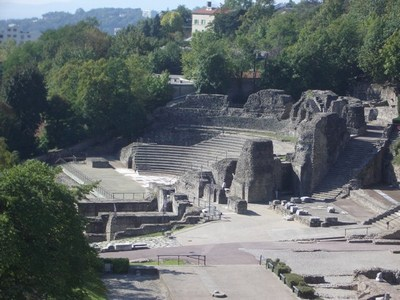
Odeon of Lyon, France

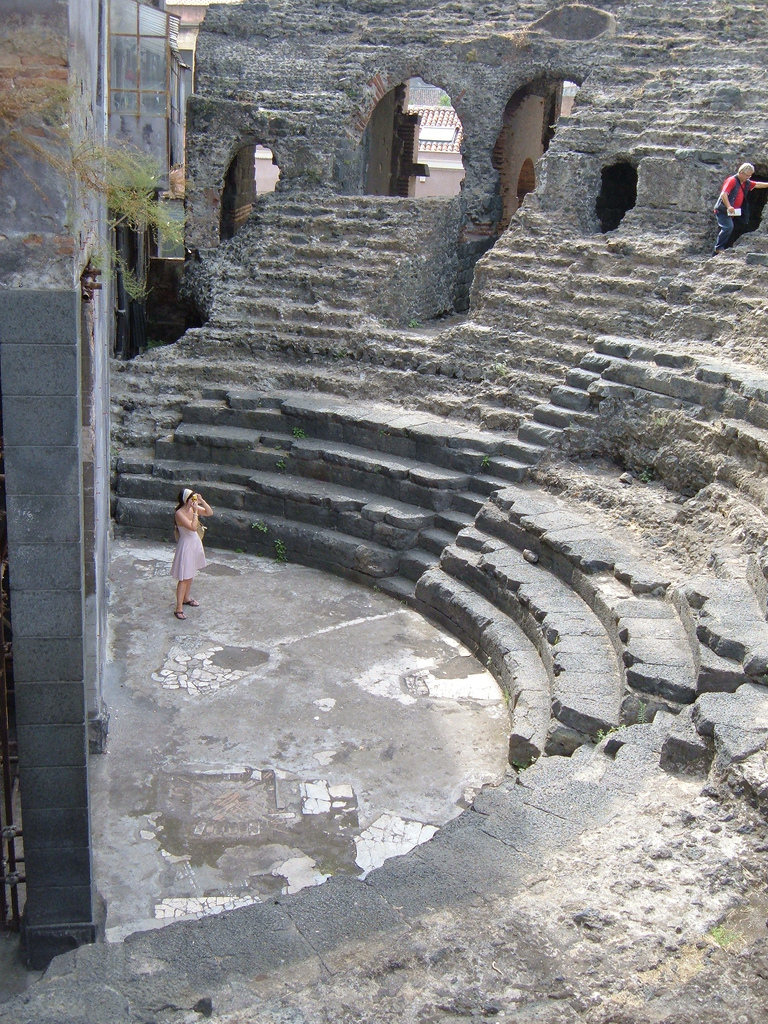
Ancient Roman Odeon at Catania, Sicily

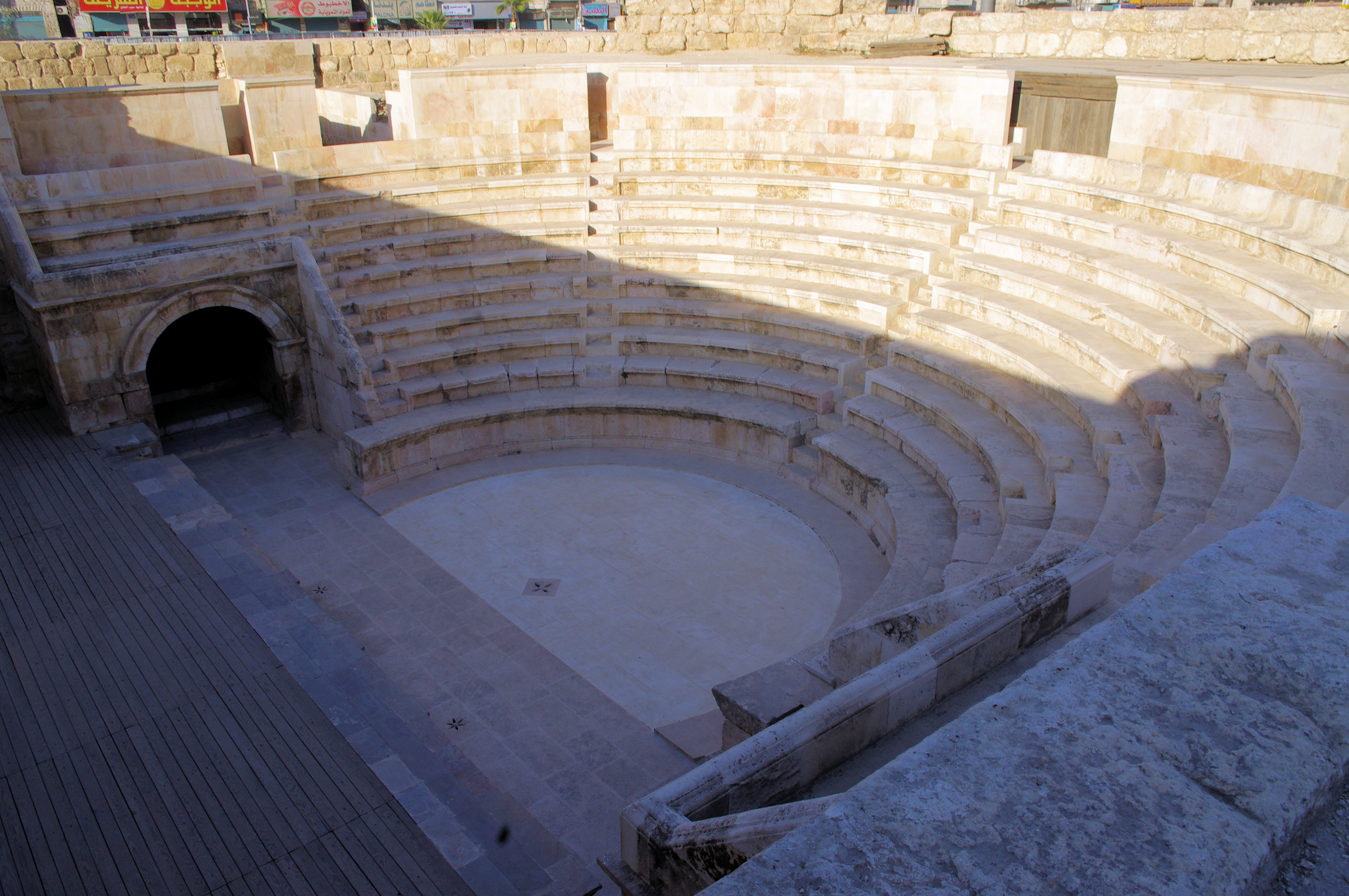
Ancient Greek Odeon of Philadelphia, Jordan

== See also ==
- Amphitheatre
- Colosseum

== Bibliography ==
- Sear, Frank (2006). Roman Theatres: An Architectural Survey. Oxford University Press. ISBN 978-0-19-814469-4.
