= Fourvière =

District of Lyon, France

Coordinates: 45°45′47″N 4°49′20″E

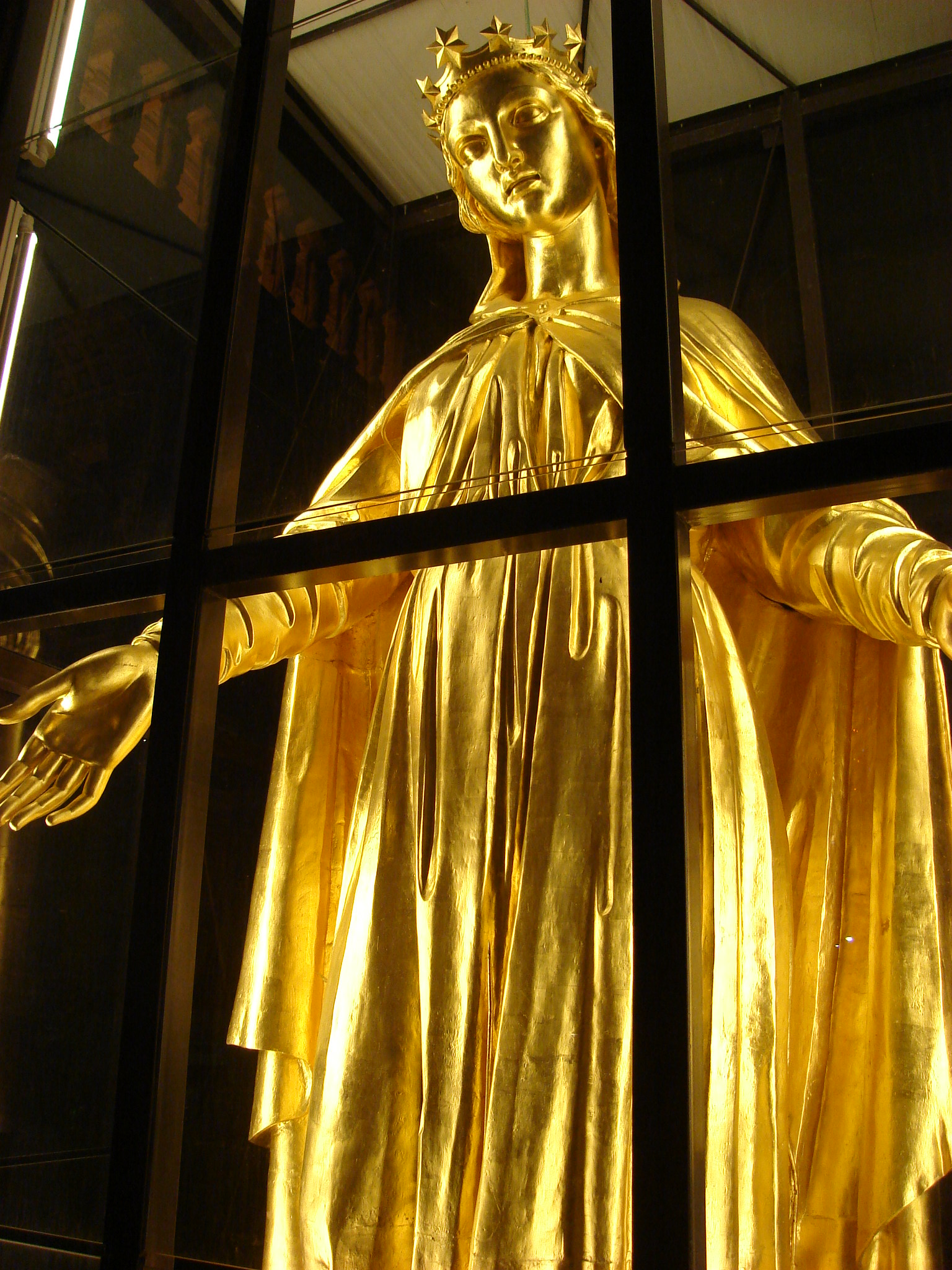
The Golden Virgin, in the Basilica of Fourvière

Fourvière (French pronunciation: [fuʁvjɛʁ]) is a city district of Lyon, France, a hill immediately west of the old part of the town, rising from the river Saône. It is the site of the original Roman settlement of Lugdunum in 43 BC. The district contains many religious buildings including convents, monasteries and chapels. It is known in Lyon as "the hill that prays".

Fourvière is part of a UNESCO World Heritage Site designated for the city of Lyon in 1998 for its testimony to Lyon's long history as an important European settlement and its extraordinary architecture.

== Description ==
The Tour Métallique de Fourvière.

Fourviere supports the world's two oldest and active funicular railway lines, and is known for the Catholic Basilica of Fourvière. The inauguration of the golden statue of the Virgin Mary on the north-west tower is the origin of the famous 8 December Festival of Lights, when the citizens of Lyon display candles (lumignons) at their windows. This festival now attracts hundreds of thousands of people into the streets of Lyon every year.

On the south side of Fourvière are the vast ruins of Roman Baths, partially intact ruins of a Roman Theatre (15 BC) and a 2nd Century Roman Odéon rediscovered in the 20th century and now home to a museum as well as a series of concerts and operas throughout the summer.

=== La Tour Métallique ===
Fourvière hill is home to the La Tour Métallique, one of Lyon's most easily recognizable landmarks, which was privately built by the land-owners to rival the Eiffel Tower in Paris. It forms the highest point in Lyon and is in fact higher than the Eiffel Tower at its summit, due to it being on a hill. It is now a television relay tower.

=== Funicular railway ===
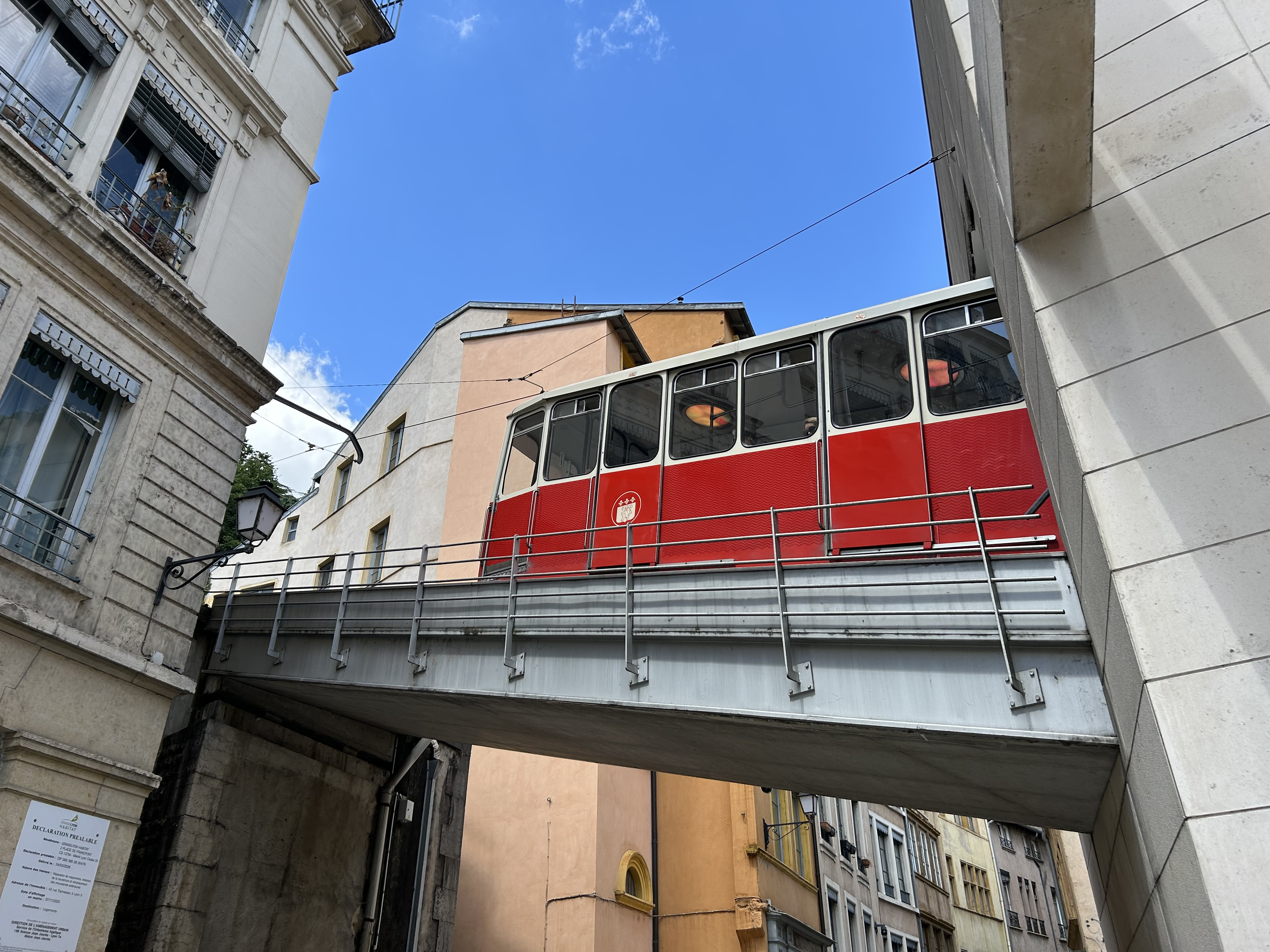
A funicular of Lyon entering Saint Jean station.

Fourviere supports the world's two oldest and active funicular railway lines.

The Funiculars of Lyon ('Funiculaires de Lyon') is a network of funicular railways. Of the five lines once in existence, only the two routes on the Fourvière hill remain in operation, with the rest of the network now either closed, converted to road vehicle use, or integrated within the Lyon underground system.

== Modern infrastructure ==
A double motorway tunnel passes under Fourvière, connecting the A6 autoroute (coming from Paris) and the A7 autoroute (coming from Marseille), both forming the "Autoroute du Soleil". Prior to the construction of the bypass of Lyon by the east, and with Lyon being virtually the only low passage between the Alps and the Massif Central (extinct) volcano range, the tunnel was famous for its traffic jams caused by a combination of local traffic, that of neighboring countries, as well as traffic between northern and southern France.

=== Threats to survival ===
The hill is very fragile in places due to springs, underground streams, ancient tunnels and aqueducts, which have caused several subsidences in the past.

== Gallery ==
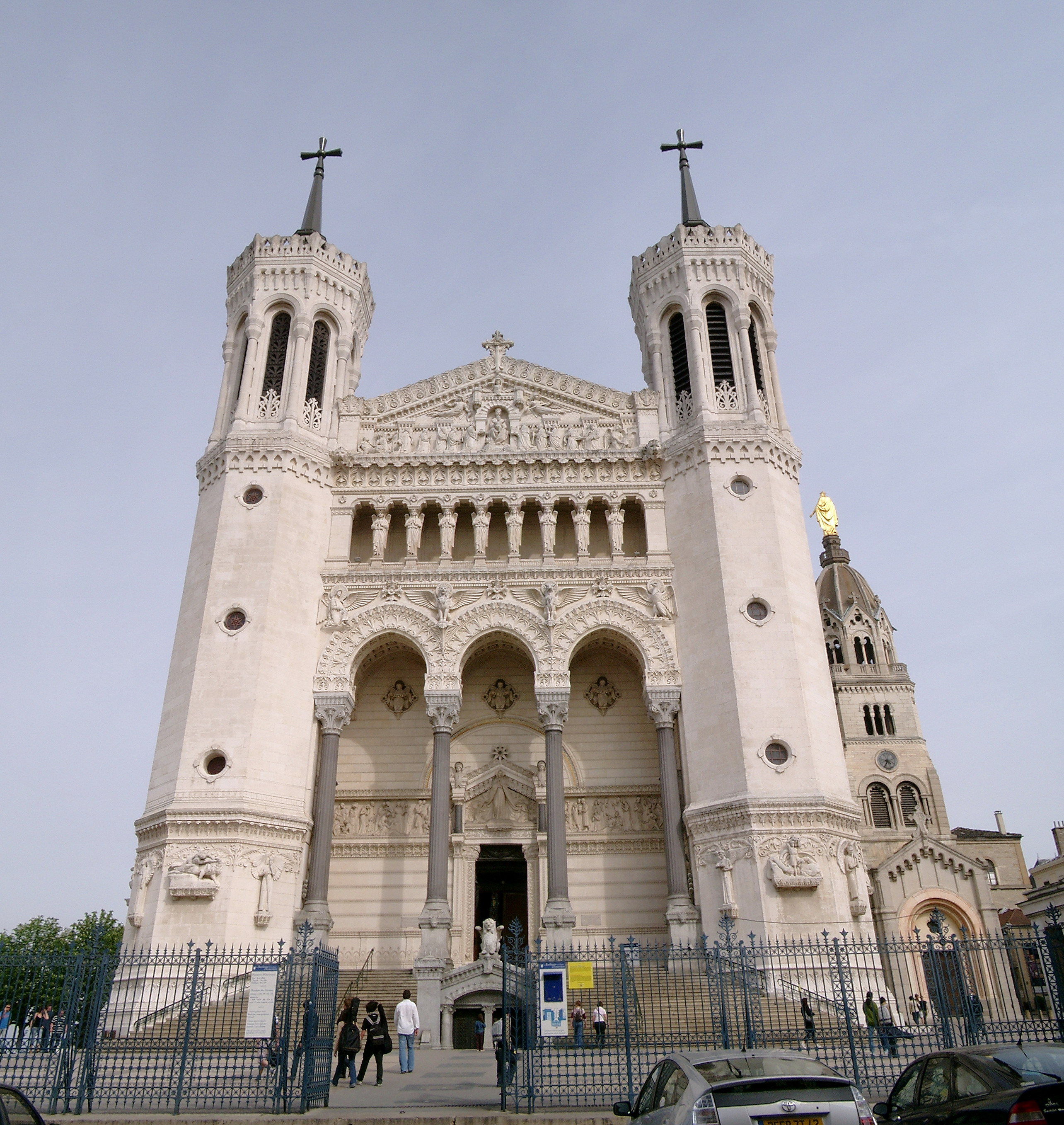
Basilica of Notre-Dame de Fourvière and the Saint-Thomas chapel on the right.

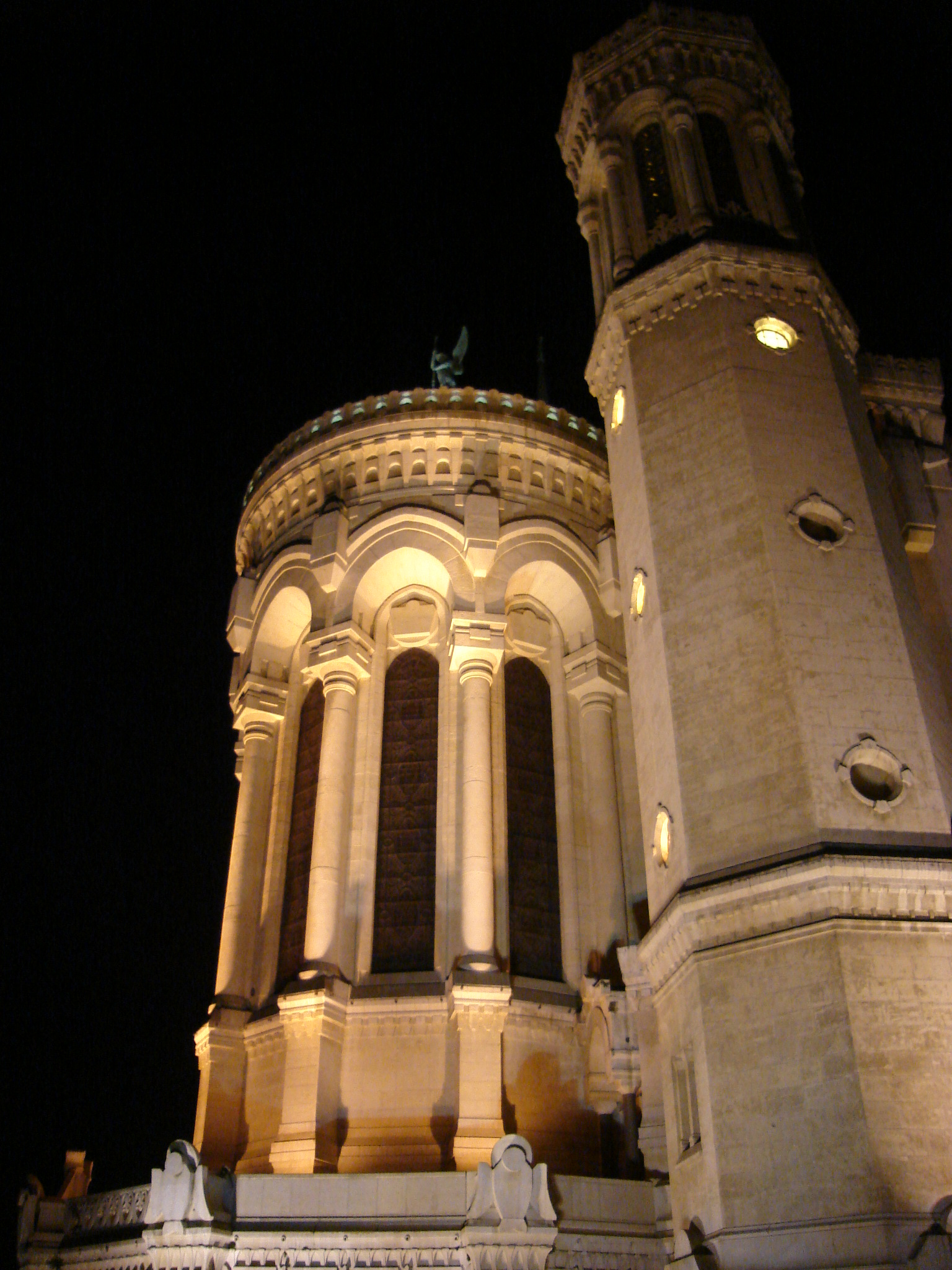
The chevet of the Basilica.

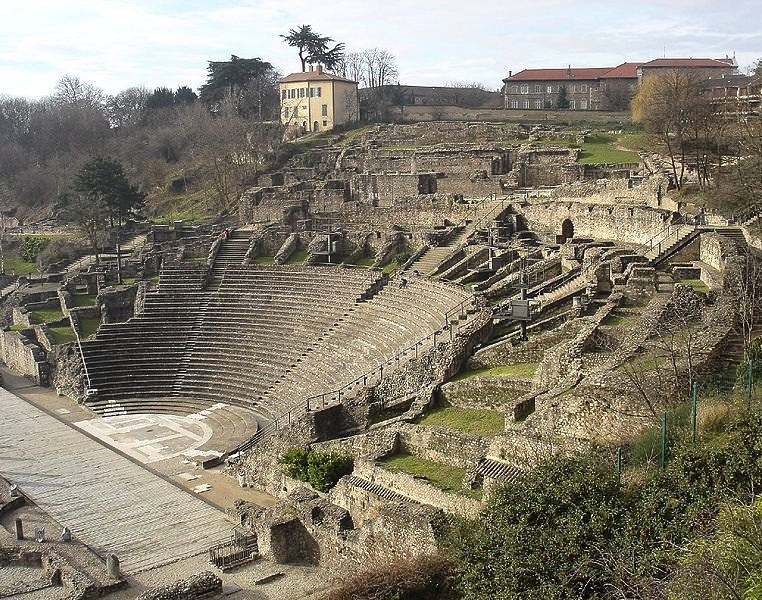
Ancient Theatre of Fourvière

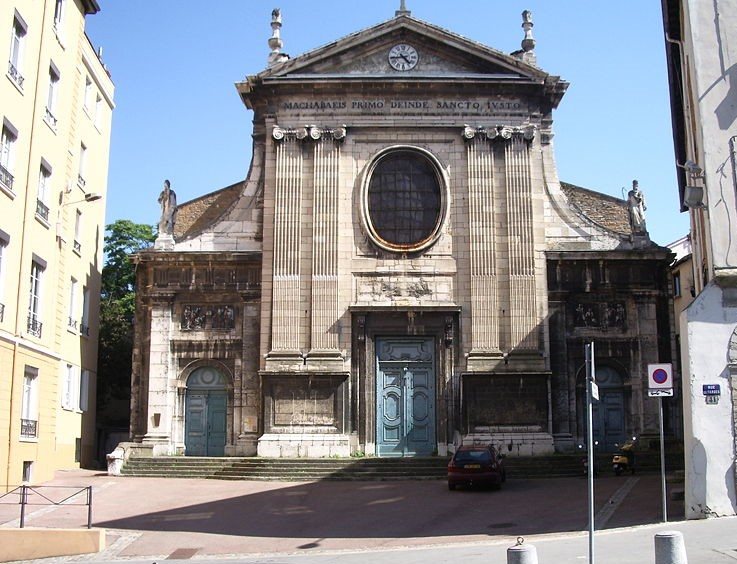
The Saint-Just church

== See also ==
- Nuits de Fourvière
- Jardin des Curiosités
