= Ancient Theatre of Fourvière =

Ancient Roman theater in Lyon, France

Coordinates: 45°45′35″N 4°49′11″E

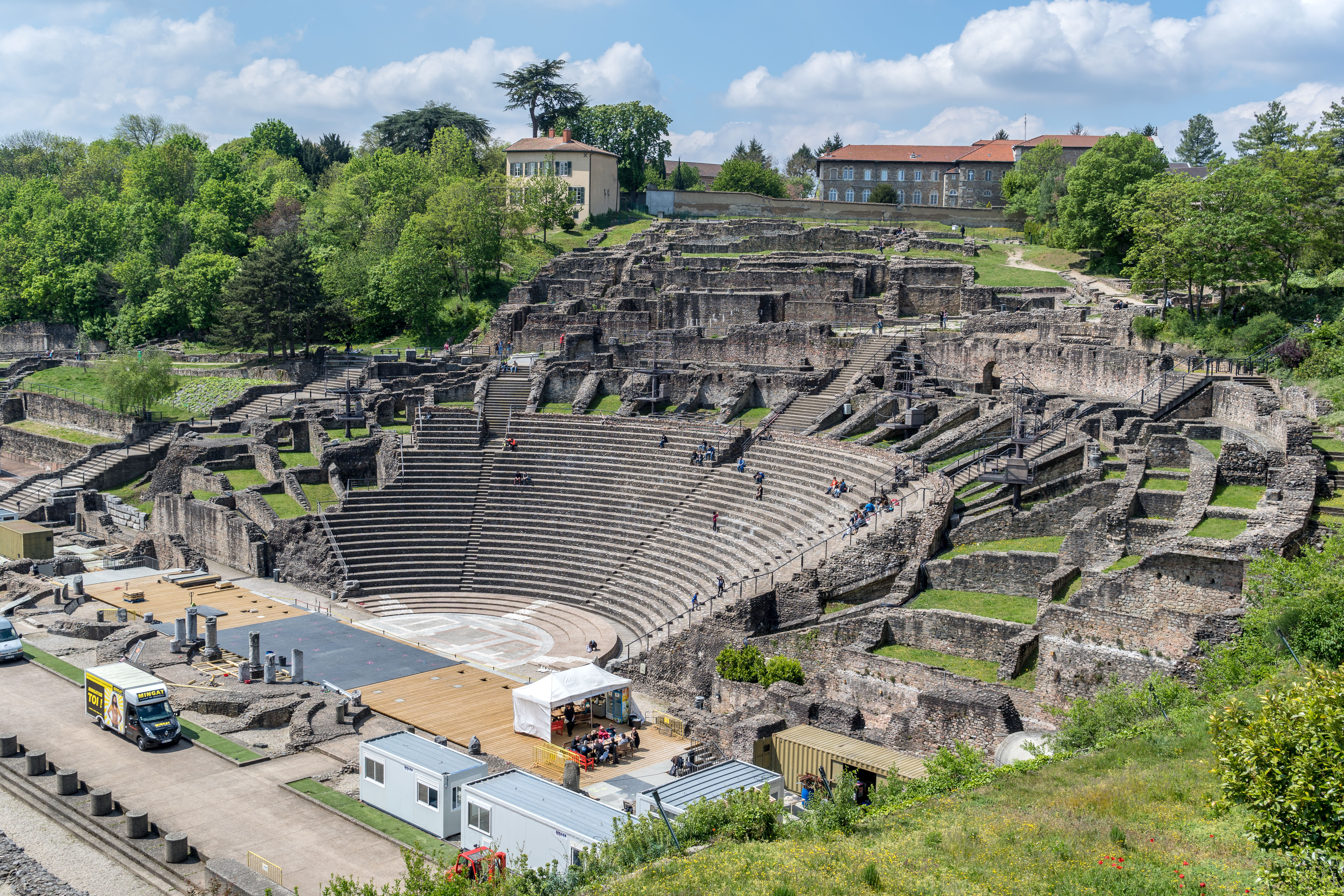
The theatre seen from the north

The Ancient Theatre of Fourvière (French: Théâtre antique de Lyon) is a Roman theatre in Lyon, France. It was built on the hill of Fourvière, which is situated in the center of the Roman city. The theatre is part of a UNESCO World Heritage Site that protects the historic center of Lyon.

== Chronology ==
The theatre was constructed in two phases: around 15 BC, a theatre with a 90 m (98 yd) diameter was built next to the hill. At the beginning of the 2nd century, the final construction added a last section for the audience. The diameter is 108 m (118 yd), and there were seats for 10,000 people.

Today the theatre is primarily a tourist site, but it is still used as a cultural venue. Each year, the Nuits de Fourvière festival takes place in the theatre.

== See also ==
- Odeon of Lyon
- List of Roman theatres
