= Odeon of Lyon =

Small ancient Roman theatre in Lyon, France

Coordinates: 45°45′31″N 4°49′11″E

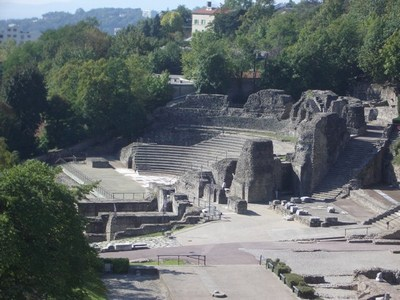

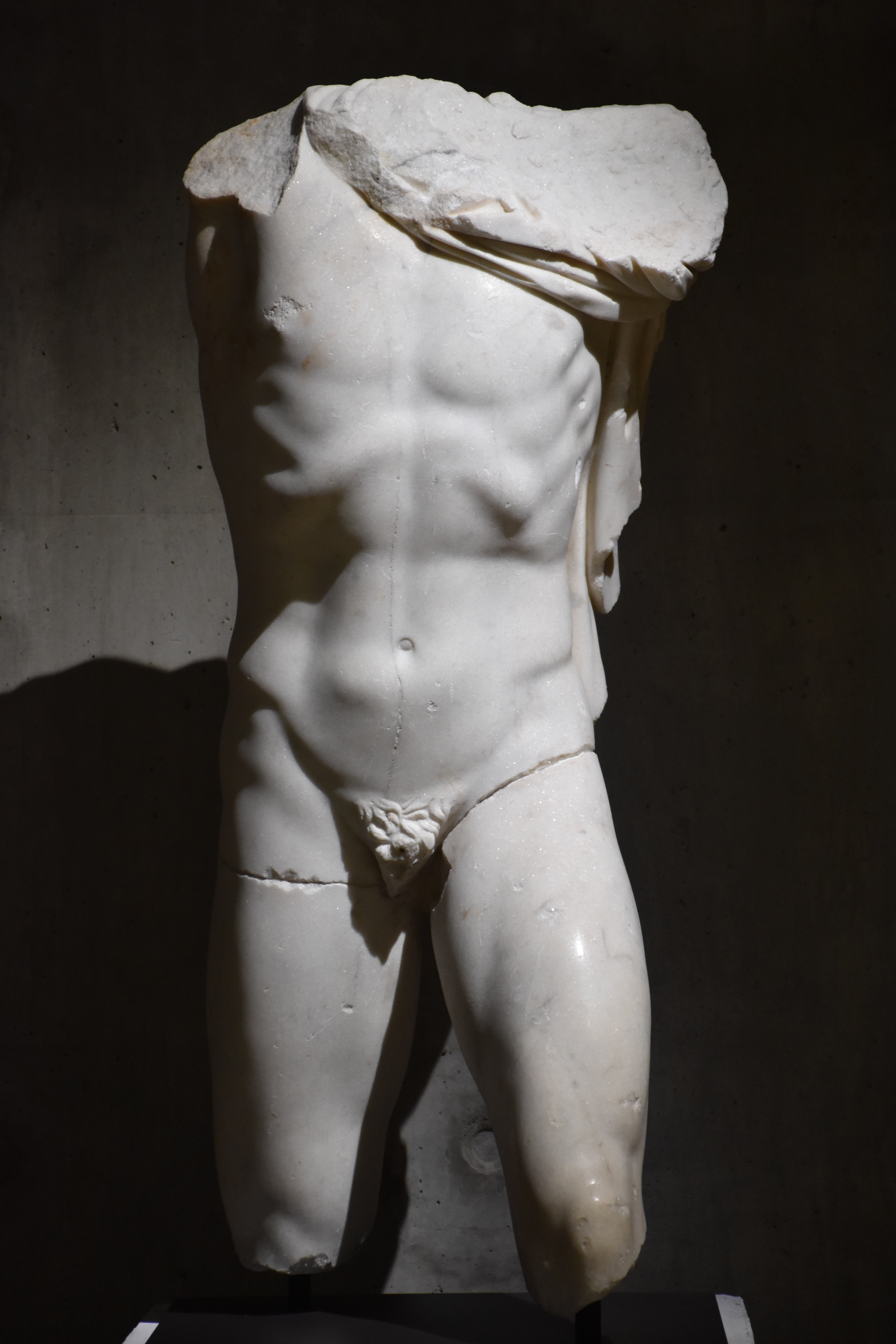
Greco-Roman male torso with legs to the knee, discovered on the site of the Odeon of Lyon in 1964. Marble. Lyon, Lugdunum

The Odeon of Lyon (French: Odéon antique de Lyon) is a small ancient Roman theatre (an odeon) near the summit of the Fourvière hill in Lyon, France. It forms a pair with the Ancient Theatre of Fourvière, one of only two such pairs in Gaul (the other is in Vienne). Along with other buildings in Lyon, it was inscribed on the UNESCO World Heritage List in 1998, protecting Lyon's long history as a powerful city and its unique architecture.

== History ==
The ruins were still visible in the sixteenth century and was wrongly considered at the time as the amphitheater where the persecution in Lyon took place in 177. Sometimes regarded as a theater or auditorium by various authors (Claude Bellièvre, Gabriel Simeoni, Guillaume Paradin), the monument appeared in several texts and plans and was eventually deemed as a cultural building.

The Odeon was built in the early to mid-second century. Archaeologists are reluctant on the date of its construction. The excavators date the building of the same period as the extension of the theater during the reign of Hadrian. It has a 73 m (80 yd) diameter and a 3,000-seat capacity, which justifies its classification as Odeon, i.e. a covered building used for musical performances and reading public, less popular than the theater performances.

It was also used as a meeting room for the notables of the city.

== See also ==
- Ancient Theatre of Fourvière
- Amphitheatre of the Three Gauls
- Nuits de Fourvière
