= Basilica of Notre-Dame de Fourvière =

Minor basilica in Lyon

- Basilica of Our Lady of Fourvière
- Basilique Notre-Dame de Fourvière
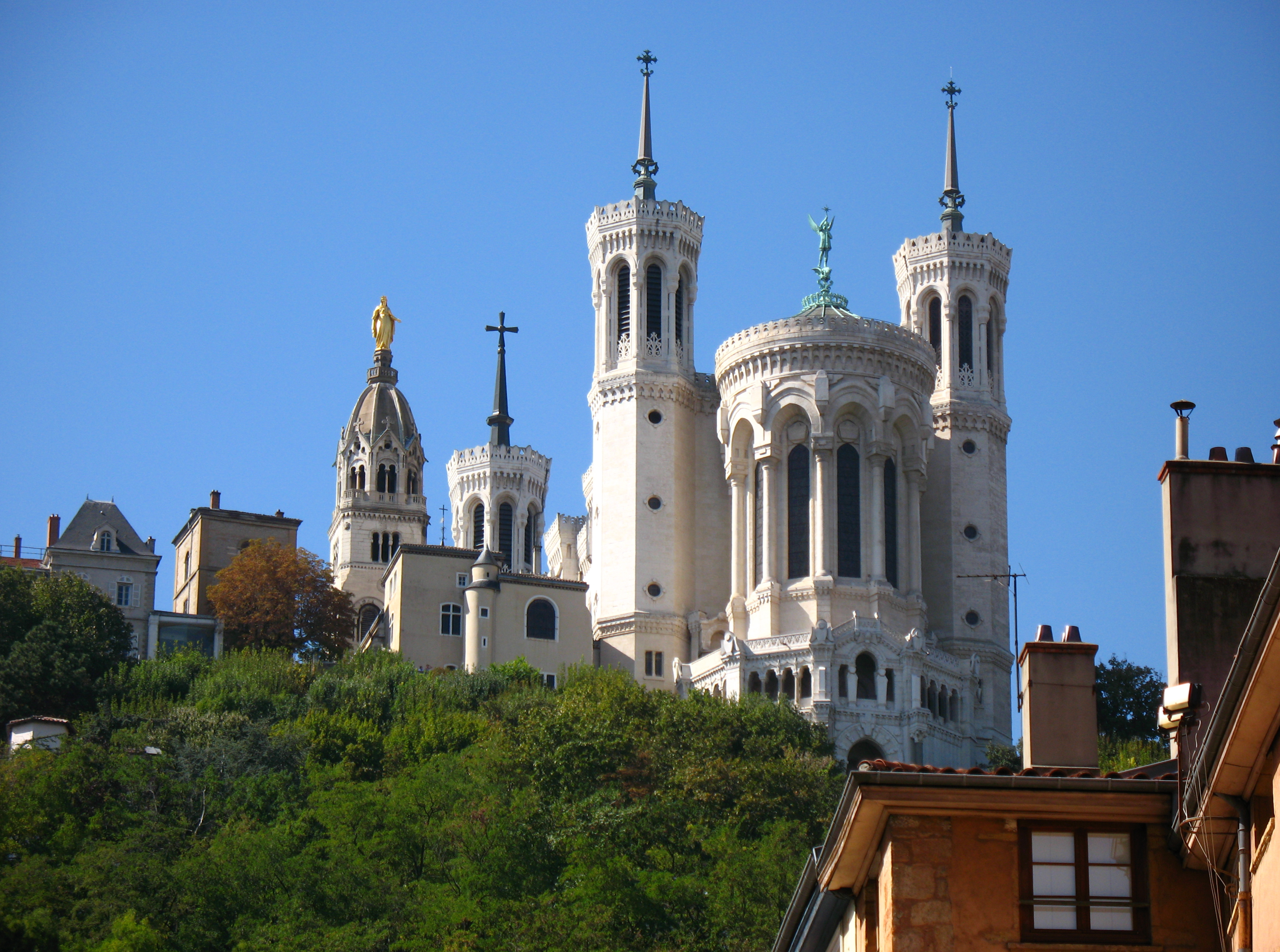
- View of the basilica from the Vieux Lyon

- Location within Metropole de Lyon Location within France
- 45°45′45″N 4°49′21″E
- Location: 8 Place de Fourvière, Lyon
- Country: France
- Language: French
- Denomination: Catholic
- Tradition: Roman Rite
- Website: fourviere.org

History
- Status: Minor basilica
- Dedication: Mary, mother of Jesus (as Our Lady of Fourvière)

Architecture
- Functional status: Active
- Architect(s): Pierre Bossan; Louis Sainte-Marie Perrin
- Style: Romanesque Revival, Gothic Revival, Neo-Byzantine
- Groundbreaking: 1872
- Completed: 1884

Specifications
- Length: 86 m (282 ft)
- Width: 35 m (115 ft)
- Materials: white marble, blue marble, pink granite, green onyx

Administration
- Archdiocese: Lyon

The Basilica of Notre-Dame de Fourvière (French: Basilique Notre-Dame de Fourvière) is a minor basilica in Lyon, France. It was built with private funds between 1872 and 1896 in a dominant position overlooking the city. The site it occupies was once the Roman forum of Trajan, the forum vetus (old forum), thus its name (as an inverted corruption of the French Vieux-Forum).

== Role in the history and life of the city ==
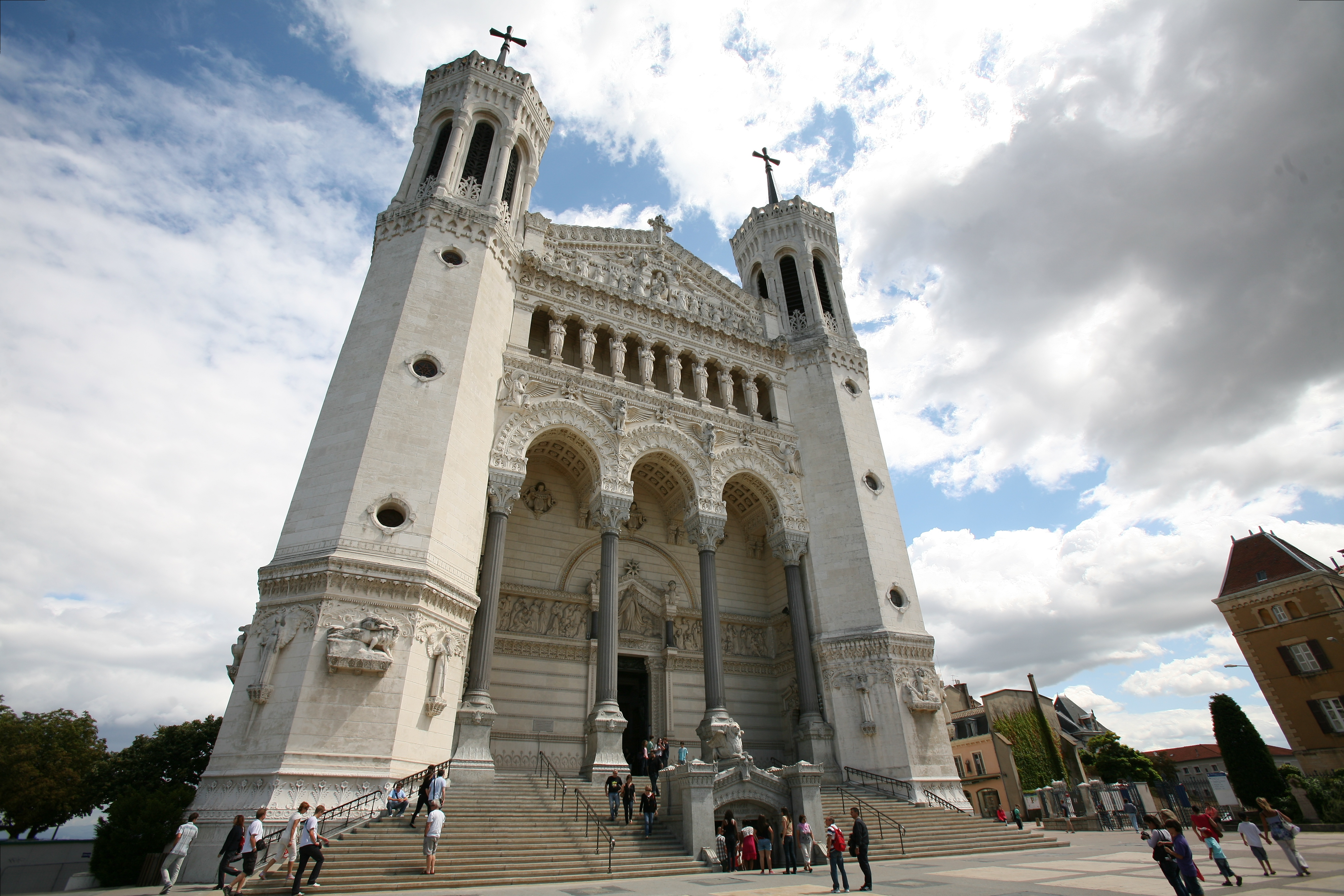
The main entry to the basilica

Fourvière is dedicated to the Virgin Mary, to whom is attributed the salvation of the city of Lyon from the bubonic plague that swept Europe in 1643. Each year in early December (December 8, day of the Immaculate Conception), Lyon thanks the Virgin for saving the city by lighting candles throughout the city, in what is called the Fête des Lumières or the Festival of Lights. The Virgin is also credited with saving the city a number of other times, such as from a Cholera epidemic in 1832, and from Prussian invasion in 1870.

During the Franco-Prussian War (1870–1871), Prussian forces, having taken Paris, were progressing south towards Lyon. Their halt and retreat were, once again, attributed by the Church to the intercession of the Virgin Mary.

Speculating on the reasons for the construction of such an elaborate and expensive building, one author makes the statement that: "The reaction to the communes of Paris and Lyon were triumphalist monuments, the Sacré-Coeur of Montmartre and the basilica of Fourvière, dominating both cities. These buildings were erected with private funds, as gigantic ex-votos, to thank God for victory over the socialists and in expiation of the sins of modern France."

Perched on top of the Fourvière hill, the basilica looms over the city of Lyon, from where it can be seen from many vantage points. The Basilica of Fourvière has become a symbol of the city. The Basilica, which offers guided tours and contains a Museum of Sacred Art, receives 2 million visitors annually. At certain times, members of the public may access the basilica's north tower for a 180-degree view of Lyon and its suburbs. On a clear day, Mont Blanc, the highest point in Europe, can be seen in the distance.

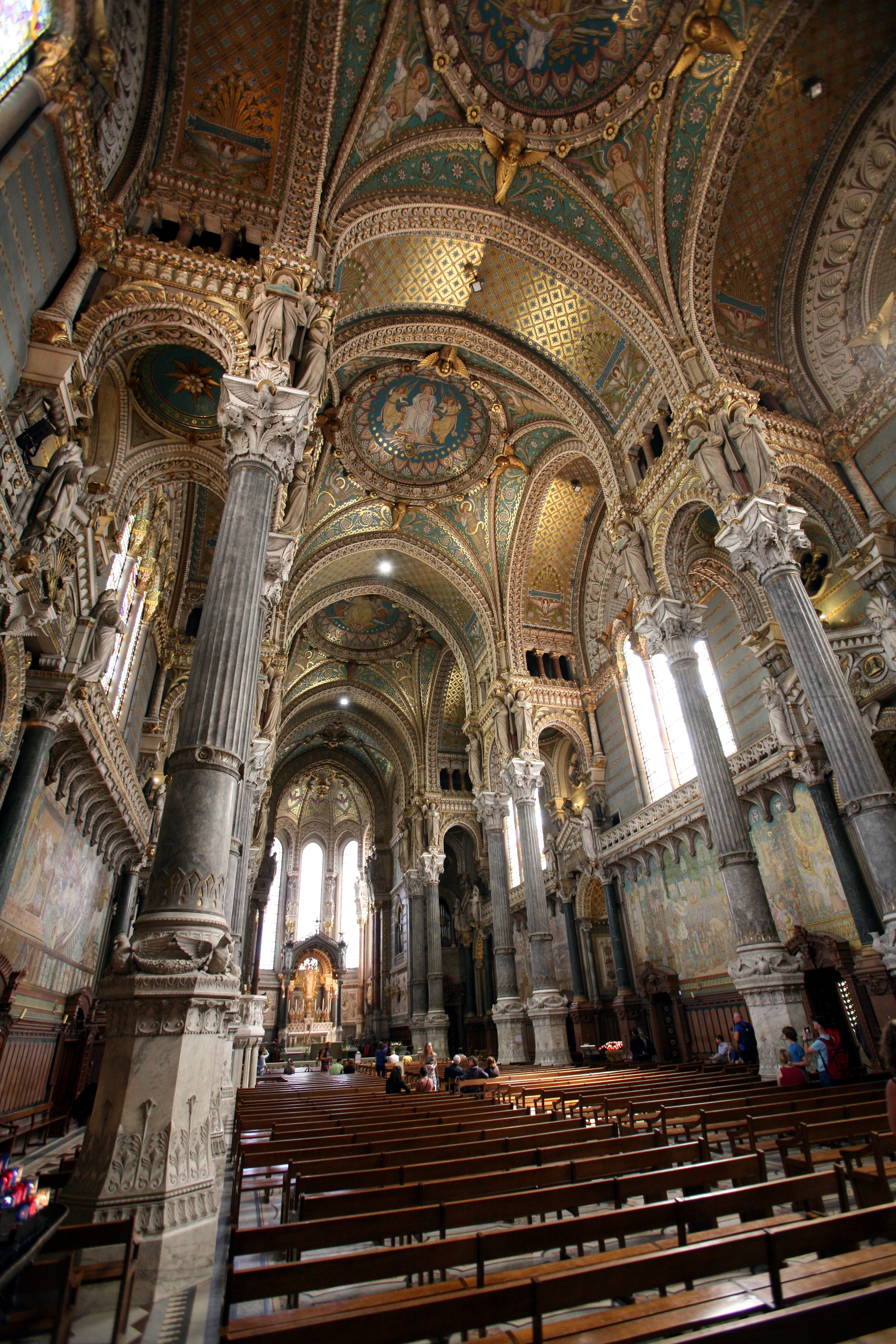
The basilica interior

== Design and construction ==
The design of the basilica, by Pierre Bossan, draws from both Romanesque and Byzantine architecture, two non-Gothic models that were unusual choices at the time. It has four main towers, and a bell tower topped with a gilded statue of the Virgin Mary. It features mosaics, stained glass, and a crypt of Saint Joseph.

Fourvière actually contains two churches, one on top of the other. The upper sanctuary is very ornate, while the lower is a much simpler design. Work on the triumphant basilica was begun in 1872 and finished in 1884. Finishing touches in the interior were not completed until as late as 1964.

Bossan's first sketches for the basilica seem to date from 1846. At the time he was in Palermo. Palermo is home to the Monreale Cathedral, The Palatine Chapel in the Norman Palace, and many other Hauteville Dynasty sponsored works featuring Byzantine Mosaics similar to the gold-leaf style in the cathedral.

The basilica has acquired the local nickname of "the upside-down elephant", because the building looks like the body of an elephant and the four towers look like its legs.

== Basilica choir ==
Les Petits Chanteurs de Saint-Marc, The Children's Choir of Saint Mark, is the official choir of the Basilica of Notre-Dame de Fourvière.

This choir became well-known following the release of the 2004 film Les Choristes. The choir's director (chef de chœur) is Nicolas Porte.

== Radio antennas ==
Since 1982, the site has hosted the antennas for Radio Fourvière — now known as Radio Chrétienne Francophone. The basilica also houses other FM transmitters. The antennas are located at the top of the two front crosses. The following radio programmes are broadcast:

Programme	Frequency	Polarisation	Power
Mouv'	87.8 MHz	vertical	4 kW
Radio chrétienne francophone	88.4 MHz	vertical	4 kW
Radio Nova	89.8 MHz	vertical	1 kW
France Culture	94.1 MHz	vertical	1 kW
Rire et Chansons	94.9 MHz	vertical	1 kW
Skyrock	96.1 MHz	vertical	4 kW
France Musique	98.0 MHz	vertical	1 kW
Chérie FM	98.9 MHz	vertical	1 kW
Radio Fuego	99.3 MHz	vertical	1 kW
France Inter	101.1 MHz	vertical	1 kW
France Info	105.4 MHz	vertical	2 kW
Impact FM	106.3 MHz	vertical	1 kW

== Shrine of Notre-Dame de Fourvière ==
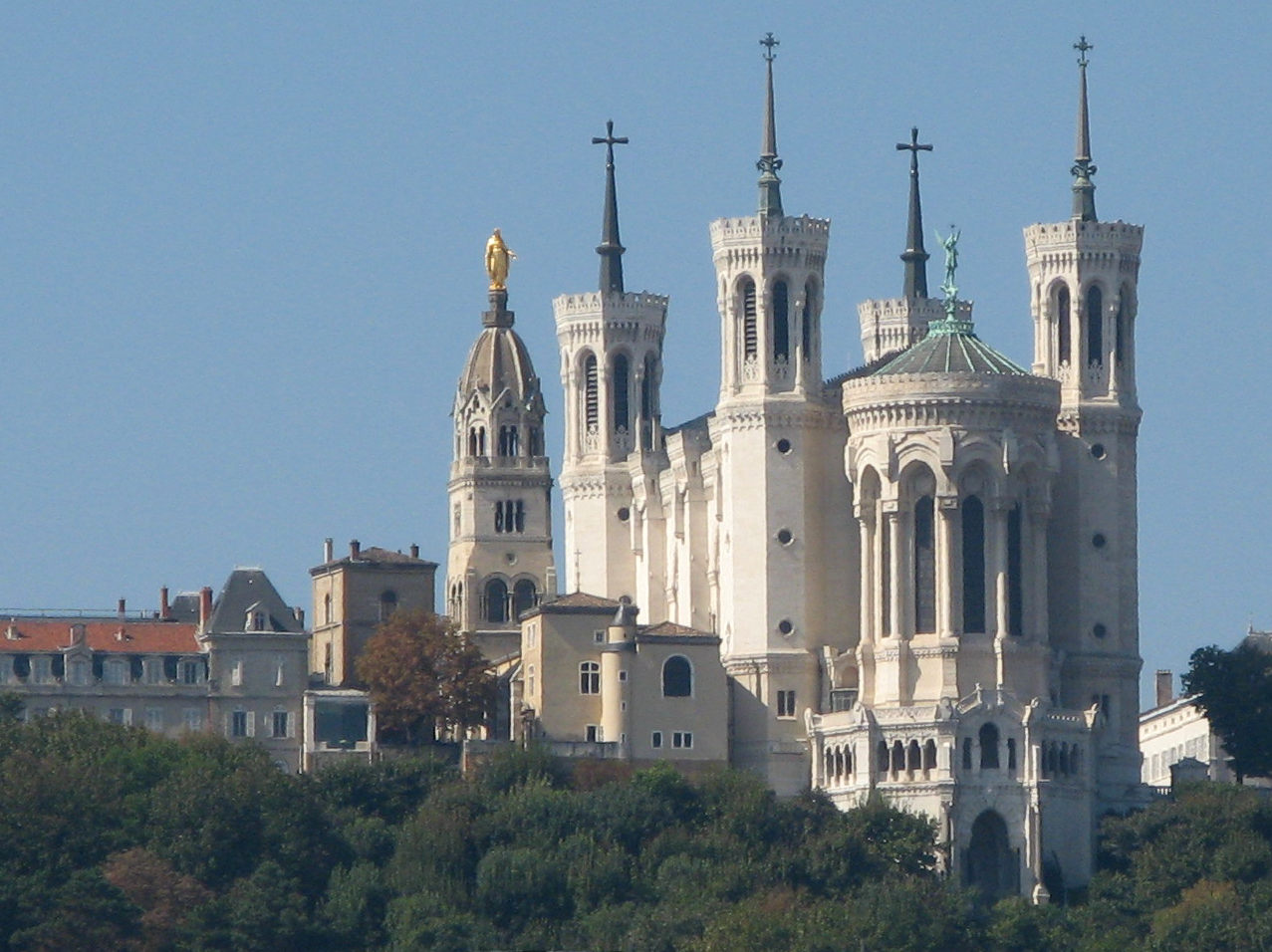
Chapelle de la Vierge topped with statue of Mary -left of the Basilica

Fourvière has always been a popular place of pilgrimage. There has been a shrine at Fourvière dedicated to Our Lady since 1170. The chapel and parts of the building have been rebuilt at different times over the centuries, the most recent major works being in 1852 when the former steeple was replaced by a tower surmounted by a golden statue of the Virgin Mary sculpted by Joseph-Hugues Fabisch (1812–1886).

On 23 July 1816 twelve Marist aspirants, priests and seminarians, climbed the hill to the shrine of Our Lady of Fourvière and placed their promise to found the Society of Mary (Marists) under the corporal on the altar while Jean-Claude Courveille celebrated Mass.

On September 30, 1821 André Coindre and ten others made private vows in the chapel there, thus founding the Fratres a Sacratissimo Corde Iesu (Brothers of the Sacred Heart), a Roman Catholic religious community primarily devoted to educating youth.

On 21 January 1851, Peter Julian Eymard prayed at the Shrine of Our Lady of Fourvière and was inspired to found the Congregation of the Blessed Sacrament.

When the city of Lyon was spared in the Franco-Prussian War (1870), the community committed to build the present Basilica alongside the ancient chapel.

== See also ==
- Parc des Hauteurs
- Three hares – an architectural icon and religious symbol used in the basilica.
