= Holyoake =

Holyoake is a surname. Notable people with the surname include:

- Francis Holyoake (1567–1653), British lexicographer
- George Holyoake (1817–1906), English secularist and co-operator
- Henry Holyoake (1657–1731), headmaster of Rugby School
- Holly Holyoake (born 1988), Welsh classical music singer
- Sir Keith Jacka Holyoake (1904–1983), New Zealand politician
- Ronald Holyoake (1894–1966), English cricketer
- Thomas Holyoake (1616?–1675), Church of England cleric

== Places ==
- Holyoake, Western Australia, a locality in Western Australia

== See also ==
- Holyoak, surname
- Hollioake, surname
- Holyoke (disambiguation)
