= Place Carnot =

Square in Lyon, France

Coordinates: 45.750832°N 4.827799°E

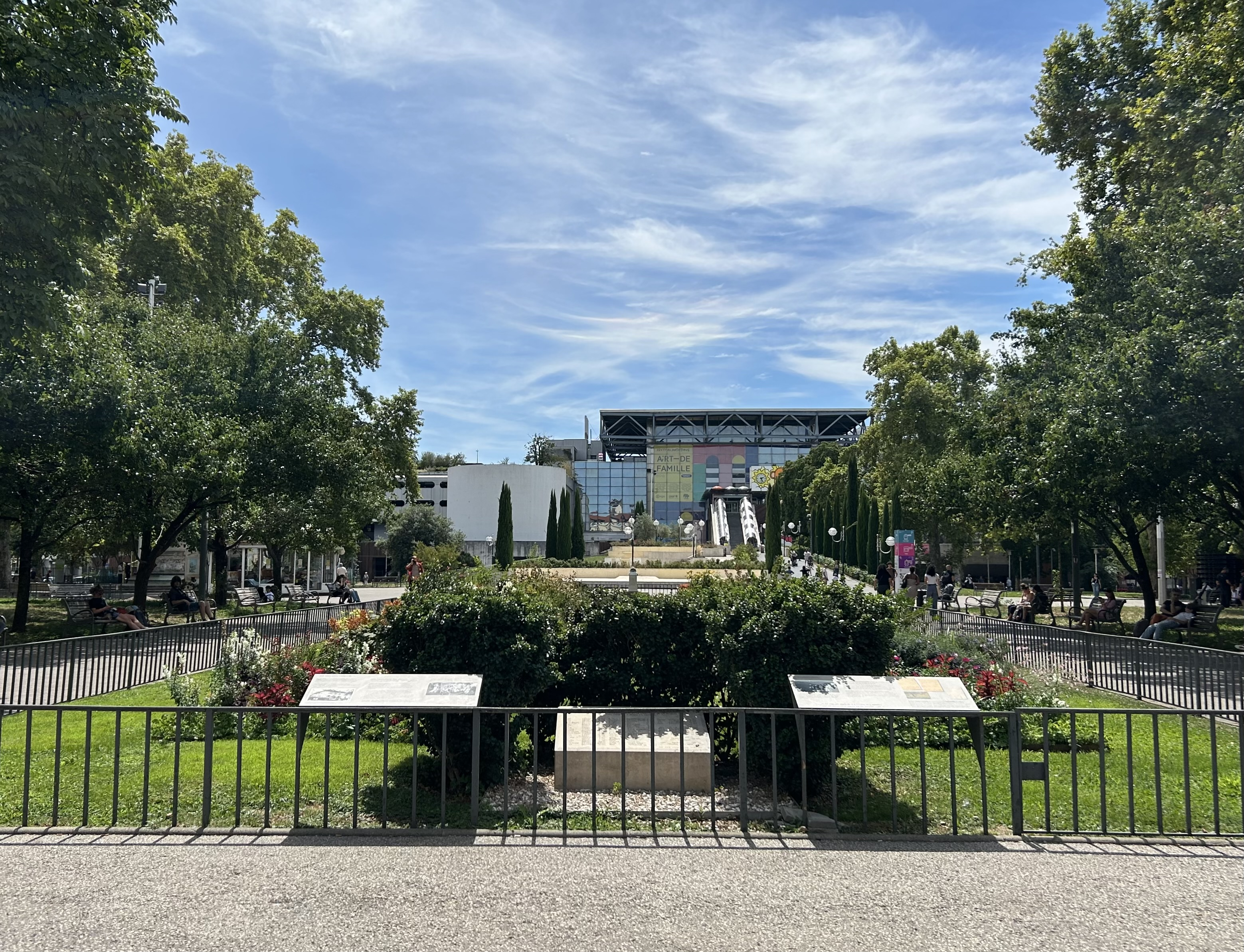
The square in 2025, with the Perrache Multimodal Hub in the background.

The Place Carnot (English: /kɑːrˈnoʊ/ kar-NOH, French: [kaʁno]) is a square located in the Perrache quarter, in the 2nd arrondissement of Lyon.

== Location ==
The Place Carnot is at the end of the Presqu'île, near the Perrache railway station. Bordered by the Rue de Condé, it can be accessed by the Rue Victor-Hugo, through the Rue Henri IV and Rue Auguste Comte. To the south, it follows the Cours de Verdun and the Perrache Multimodal Hub, a major public transit hub linked to the railway station. Traboules lead to the Cours Charlemagne, either from the lobby of the Perrache railway station, or through underneath.

Traffic travels on the left to the north and in the opposite direction clockwise from the Cours Verdun Récamier to the Cours Verdun Gensoul, i.e. from the Rhône to the Saône.

== History ==
During the First Empire, the square was named Place des Victoires. The name was changed to Place Louis XVI under Charles X, then Place Louis XVIII (1821–48), Place de la Liberté (1848), Place de la République (1848–49), Place Napoléon (1849–71) and Place Perrache (1871–89). The name Place Carnot was officially assigned by the Municipal Council on 18 February 1889, in honor of Lazare Carnot, a Hero of the Revolution.

The statue in the square (Allegory of the Republic) was inaugurated in the same year by Carnot's grandson, French President Sadi Carnot, who was assassinated five years later (on 24 June 1894) by an Italian anarchist during his second trip to Lyon.

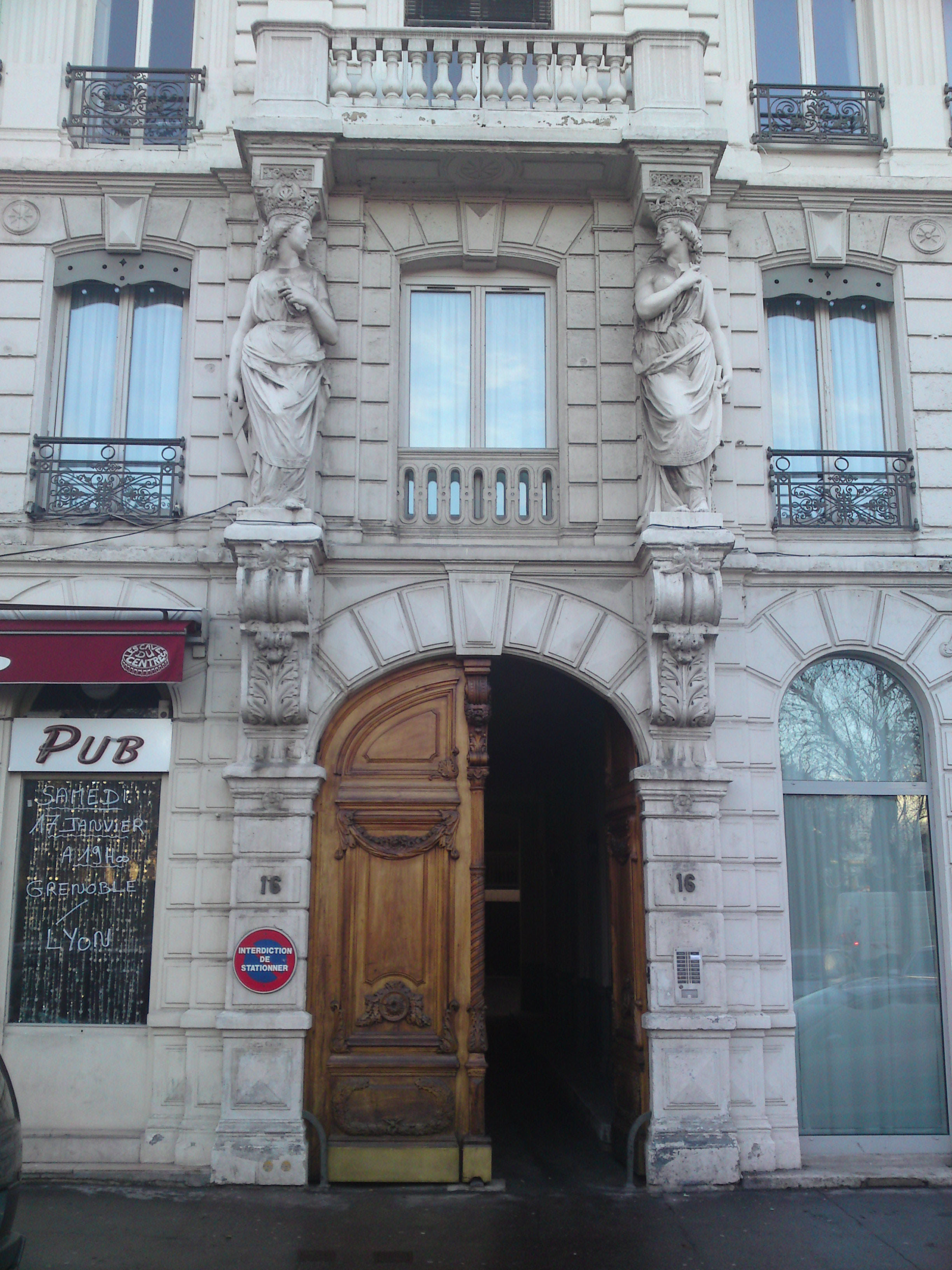
Sculpture by J. Brunel, 16 Place Carnot

== Description ==
The square has an area of 11,000 square meters, and consists mainly of plane trees, with cypresses and holly oaks on the Southern side.

Nineteenth-century buildings of five or six floors, decorated and well maintained, line the north and east sides of the square. The Catholic University of Lyon is on the west side.

There is a playground for children, a carousel and a small sports ground. The square also hosts 140 cabins during the Christmas market. There is a farmers' market on Wednesdays from 16:00 to 19:30 on the north side of the square.

== See also ==
- List of streets and squares in Lyon
