= Holly oak (disambiguation) =

Holly oak is a name that has been used for some species of oaks with spiny leaves, including Quercus coccifera and Quercus ilex.

Holly oak(s) may also refer to:

- Holly Oak, Delaware, an unincorporated community in New Castle County, Delaware
- Hollyoaks, a British soap opera

== See also ==
- Holly Oak gorget, a shell artifact believed to be an archaeological forgery
- Holyoak, a surname
- Holyoke (disambiguation)
- Holy Oak, musician
