= Holyoak =

Holyoak is a surname. Notable people with the name include:

- Keith Holyoak, (born 1950) cognitive psychologist
- Melissa Holyoak, U.S. lawyer and politician
- Neil Holyoak, musician under the stage name Holy Oak
- Percy Hobson Holyoak (1874–1926), British businessman in Hong Kong
- Warren Holyoak (born 1934), Australian rules footballer

== See also ==
- Holyoake (surname)
- Holyoke (disambiguation)
- Holly oak (disambiguation)
