= Perrache =

Perrache may refer to:

- Perrache (quarter), a district of Lyon, France
- Lyon-Perrache station, one of the main railway stations of Lyon
