= Perrache Multimodal Hub =

Transport hub in Lyon, France

Perrache
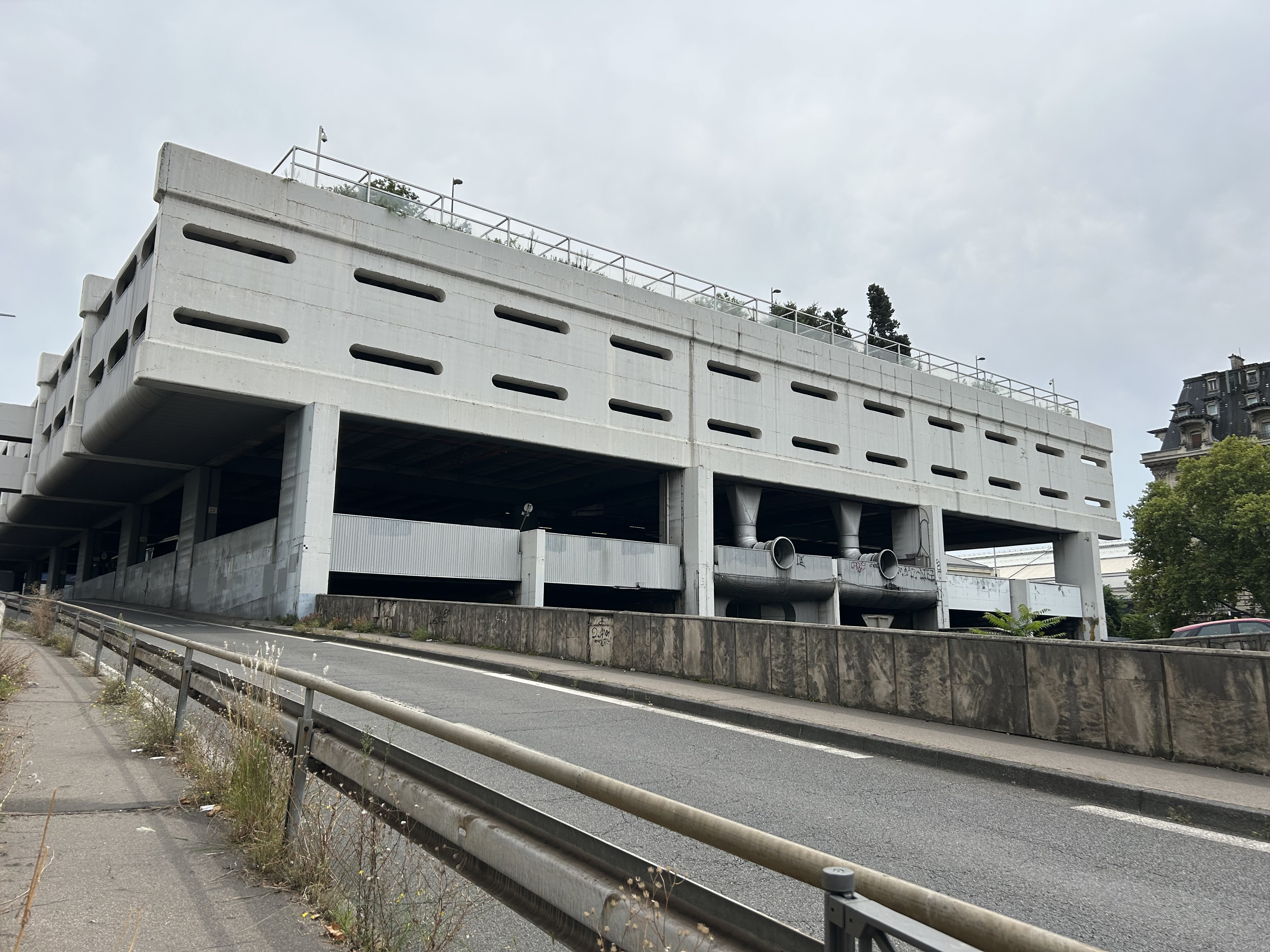
- The transport hub seen from the Cours de Verdun in 2025.

General information
- Location: 2nd arrondissement of Lyon; France
- Coordinates: 45°44′58″N 4°49′37″E
- System: Lyon Métro, tramway and bus hub, international coach station
- Owner: Metropolis of Lyon; SYTRAL Mobilités (in French)
- Operator: TCL
- Lines: Lyon Metro Lyon Metro Line A Lyon tramway Lyon tramway#Line T1 Lyon tramway#Line T2
- Platforms: Métro Line A: 2 side platforms Tramways: 2 side platforms
- Tracks: Métro Line A: 2 Tramways: 2
- Connections: Lyon-Perrache station

Construction
- Accessible: Yes

History
- Opened: 25 June 1976 (entire building); 2 May 1978 (métro line A); 2 January 2001 (tramways)

Services
| Preceding station | Lyon Metro | Following station |
|---|---|---|
| Terminus | Line A | Ampère–Victor Hugo towards Vaulx-en-Velin–La Soie |
| Preceding station | Lyon tramway | Following station |
| Place des Archives towards Debourg | Line T1 | Quai Claude Bernard towards La Doua–IUT Feyssine |
| Place des Archives towards Hôtel de Région–Montrochet | Line T2 | Centre Berthelot–Sciences Po Lyon towards Saint-Priest–Bel Air |
Location

Perrache Multimodal Hub (Centre d'échanges de Perrache in French), also called Perrache or Lyon-Perrache, is a major transport hub in the 2nd arrondissement of Lyon. It is a large building with five levels, located next to the Lyon-Perrache railway station which is directly linked by a pedestrian footbridge.

Named Perrache in the TCL urban transit network, it is a major hub served by métro line A, tramway lines T1 and T2 and many bus lines. The building also houses a coach station served by regional, national and international coach services. Some shops and restaurants are located inside.

The junction between metropolitan highways M6 and M7 is located under the building.

== History ==
After the railway station opened in June 1857, Perrache became a public transit hub starting from early 20th century, as it became the terminus of many lines of Lyon original tramway network. Then, trolleybuses, buses and coaches arrived at Perrache.

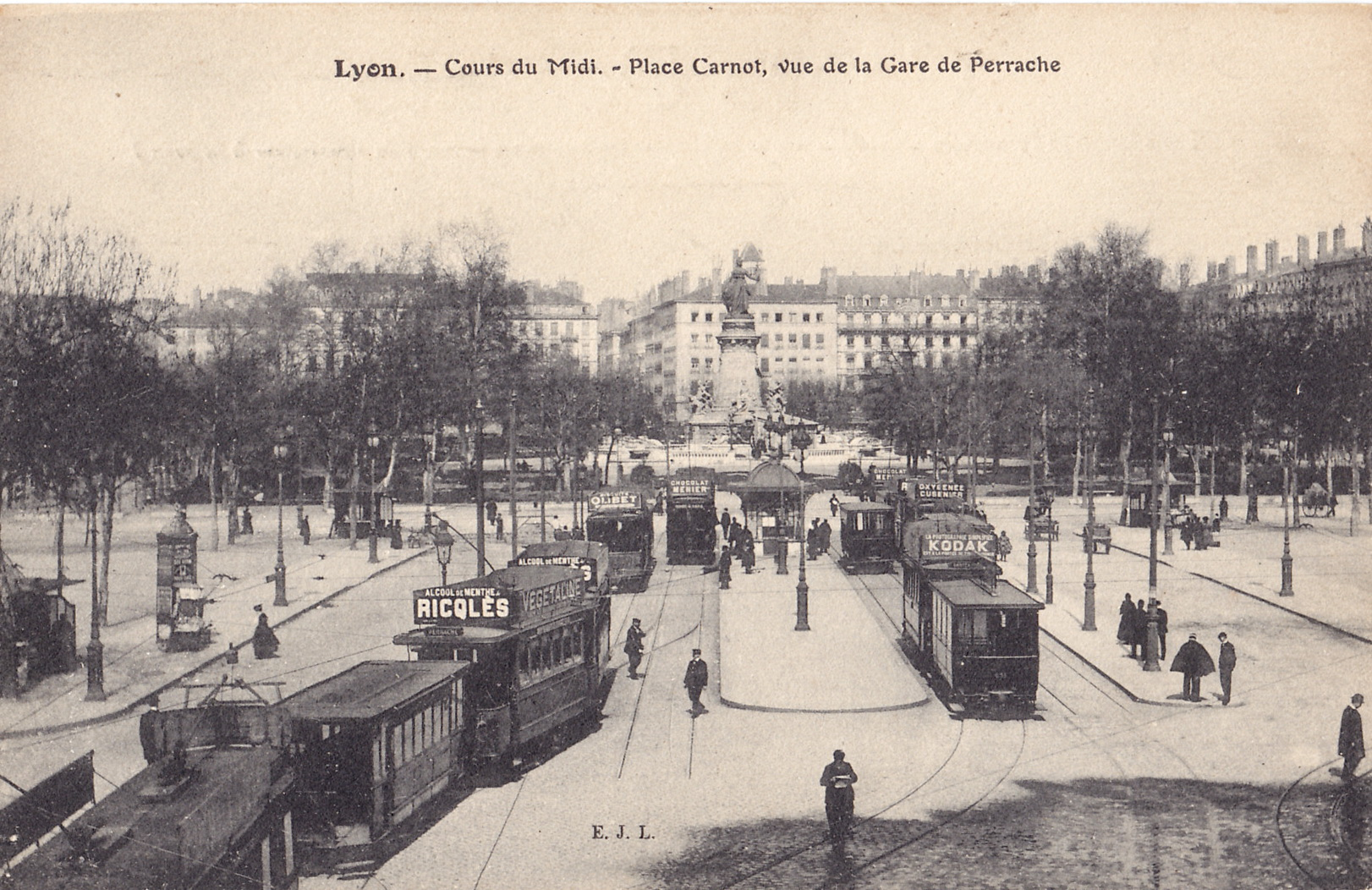
Old tramways at Perrache, Place Carnot.

On 2 May 1978, the métro station opened as well as the new line A.

On 2 January 2001, the new Lyon tramway network was launched, with two first lines T1 and T2 departing from Perrache. Nowadays, Perrache is no longer the terminus of lines T1 (since 2005) and T2 (since 2021), as they were extended to the Confluence neighbourhood in the south of Perrache.

On 21 June 2021, the Passage France Pejot has opened, a new way allowing pedestrians and cyclists to pass at ground level under both Perrache Multimodal Hub and railway station, linking Place Carnot and Place des Archives. The same way already existed before but was dedicated to cars.

=== Renovation project ===
On 14 June 2022, the Metropolis of Lyon announced a large renovation project for the whole building of Perrache Multimodal Hub. The whole complex of Perrache, including both Multimodal Hub and railway station, is seen as an urban barrier between northern and southern parts of the neighbourhood. Also, the Multimodal Hub is in itself a barrier between Place Carnot and Perrache railway station, as the front of the railway station can't be seen from Place Carnot.

The main aim of the project is to create a direct link for pedestrians between Place Carnot and Perrache railway station at ground level, instead of getting upstairs in the Multimodal Hub to get in the railway station. This direct link will be created by demolishing a part of the Multimodal Hub, permitting the creation of a wide covered passage at ground level through the Multimodal Hub. The Multimodal Hub will remain in place above and on both sides of the passage. This new passage will be surrounded by shops, restaurants and a hotel.

Renovation works should begin in 2024 and take place until 2028.

== Gallery ==
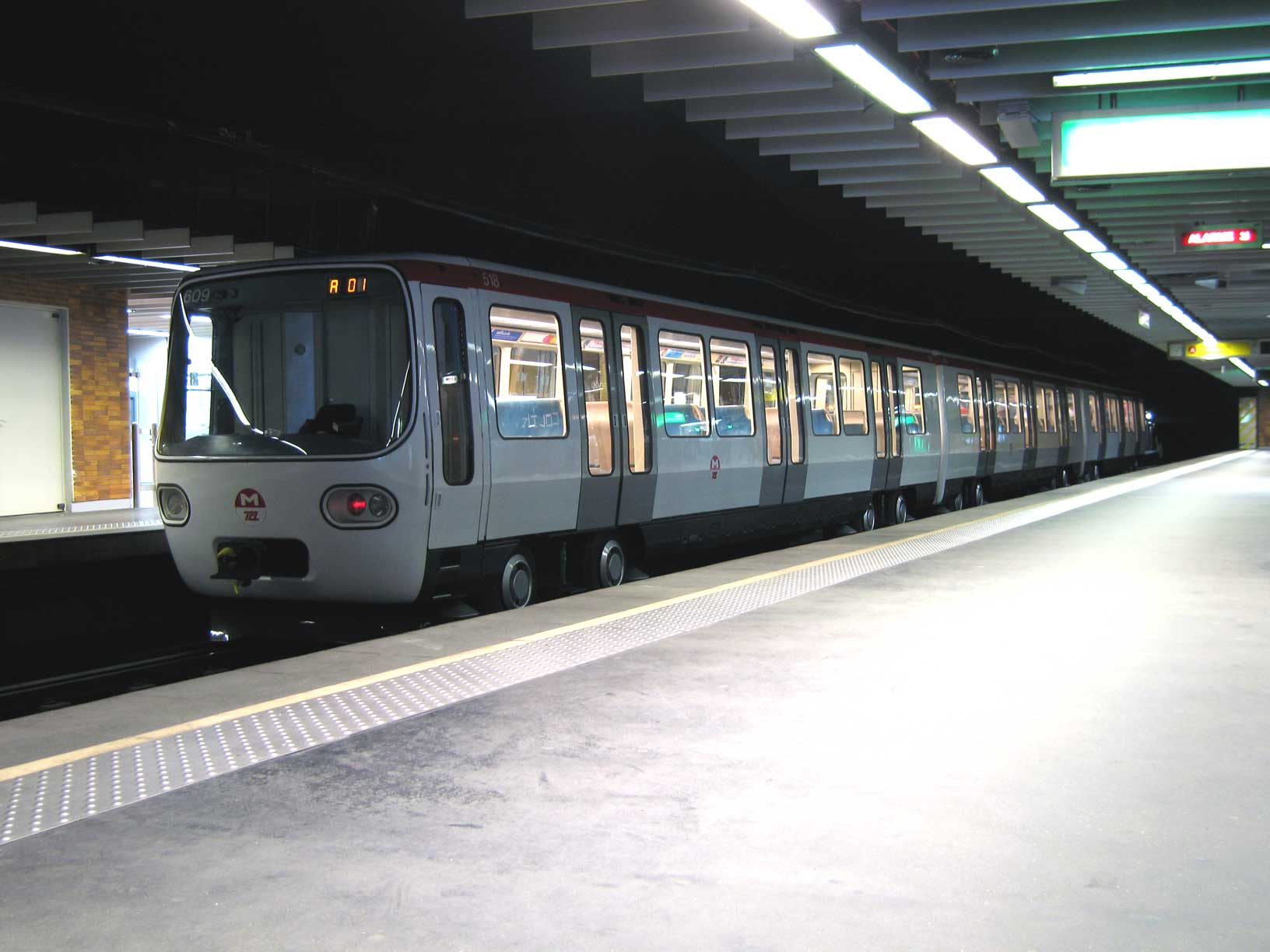
Métro Line A station (2006)

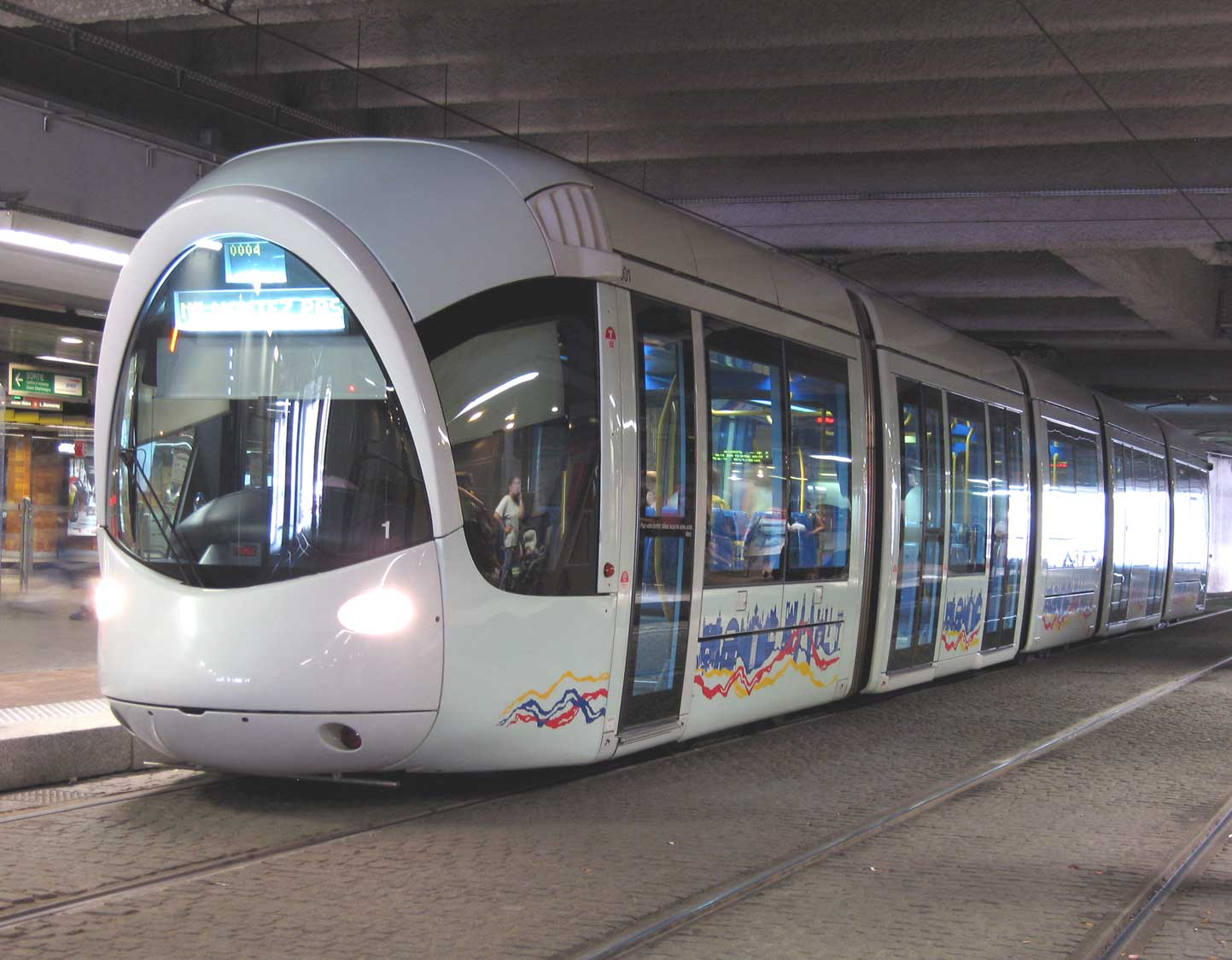
Tramway station (2006)

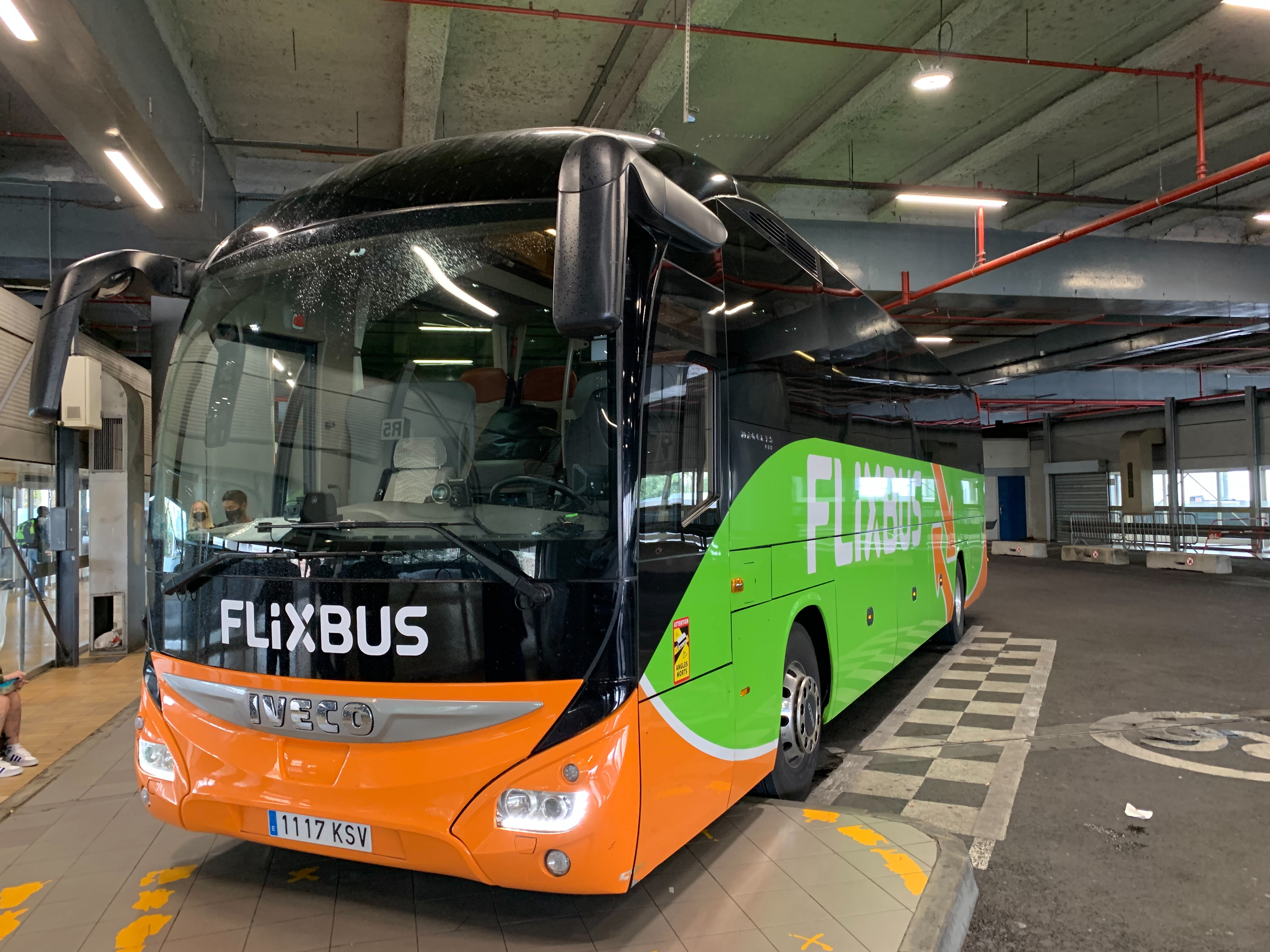
Coach station (2021)

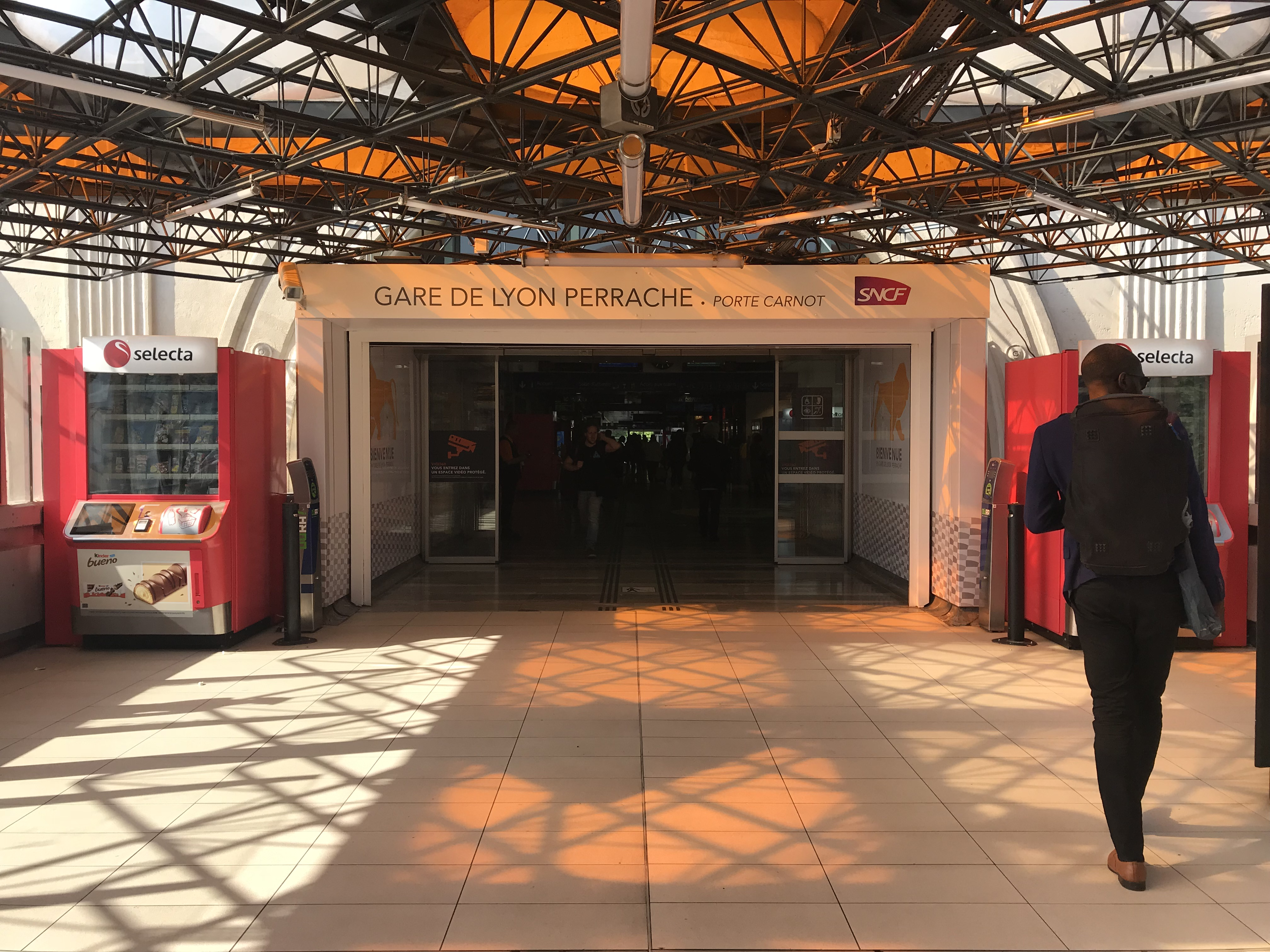
Entrance of railway station from the Multimodal Hub through the pedestrian footbridge (2018)

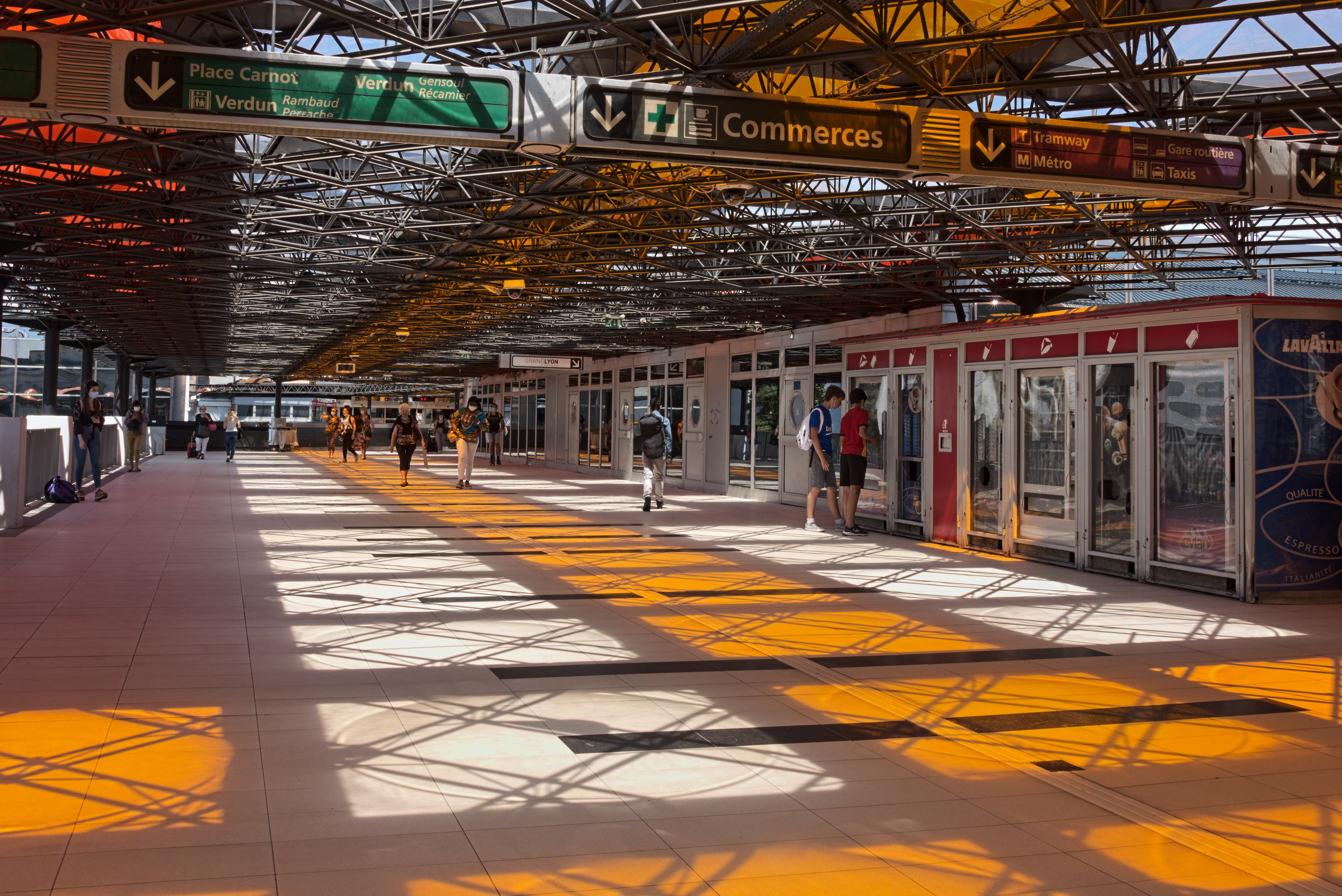
The pedestrian footbridge between the Multimodal Hub and railway station (2021)

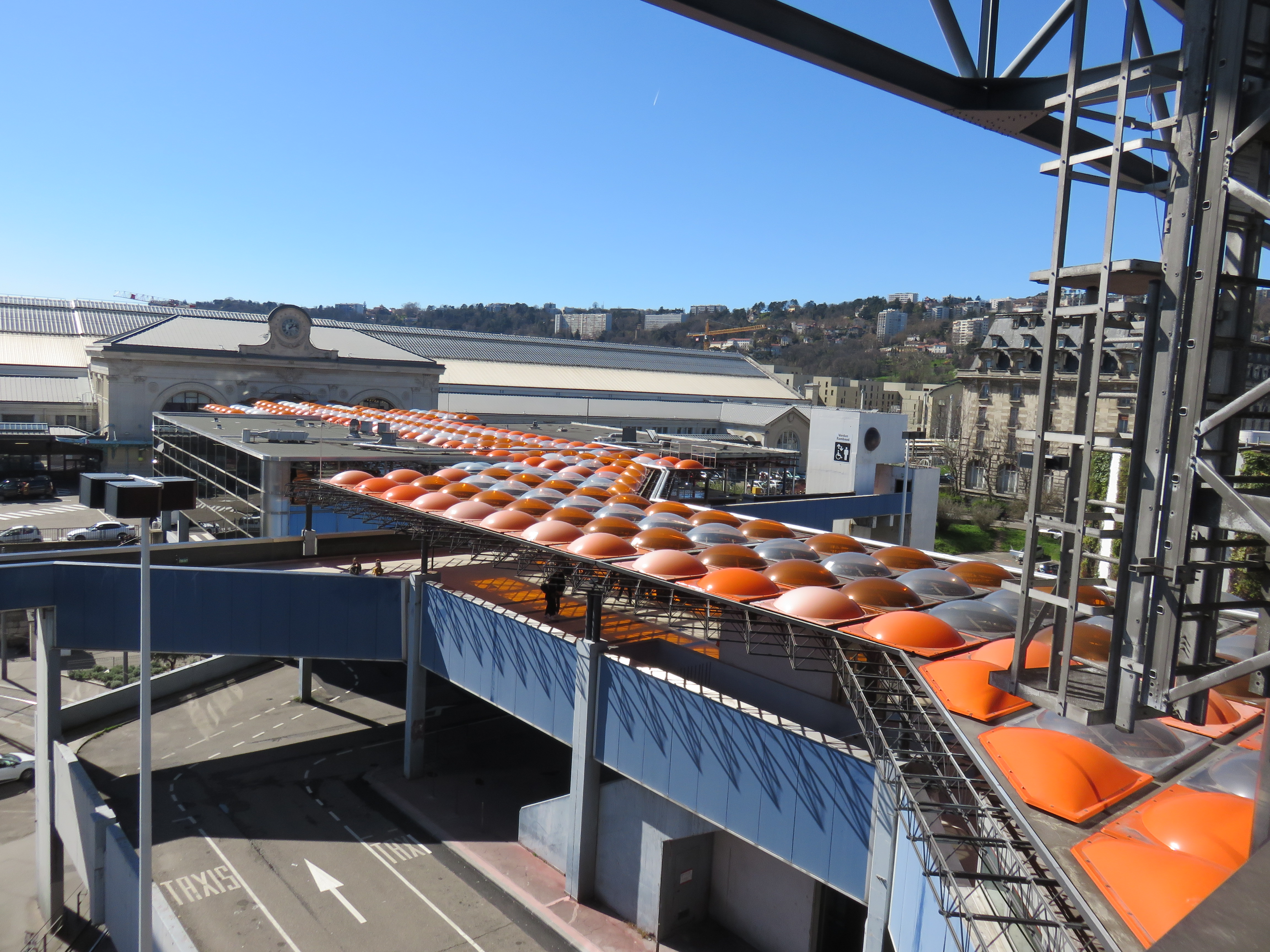
Above the pedestrian footbridge (2019)

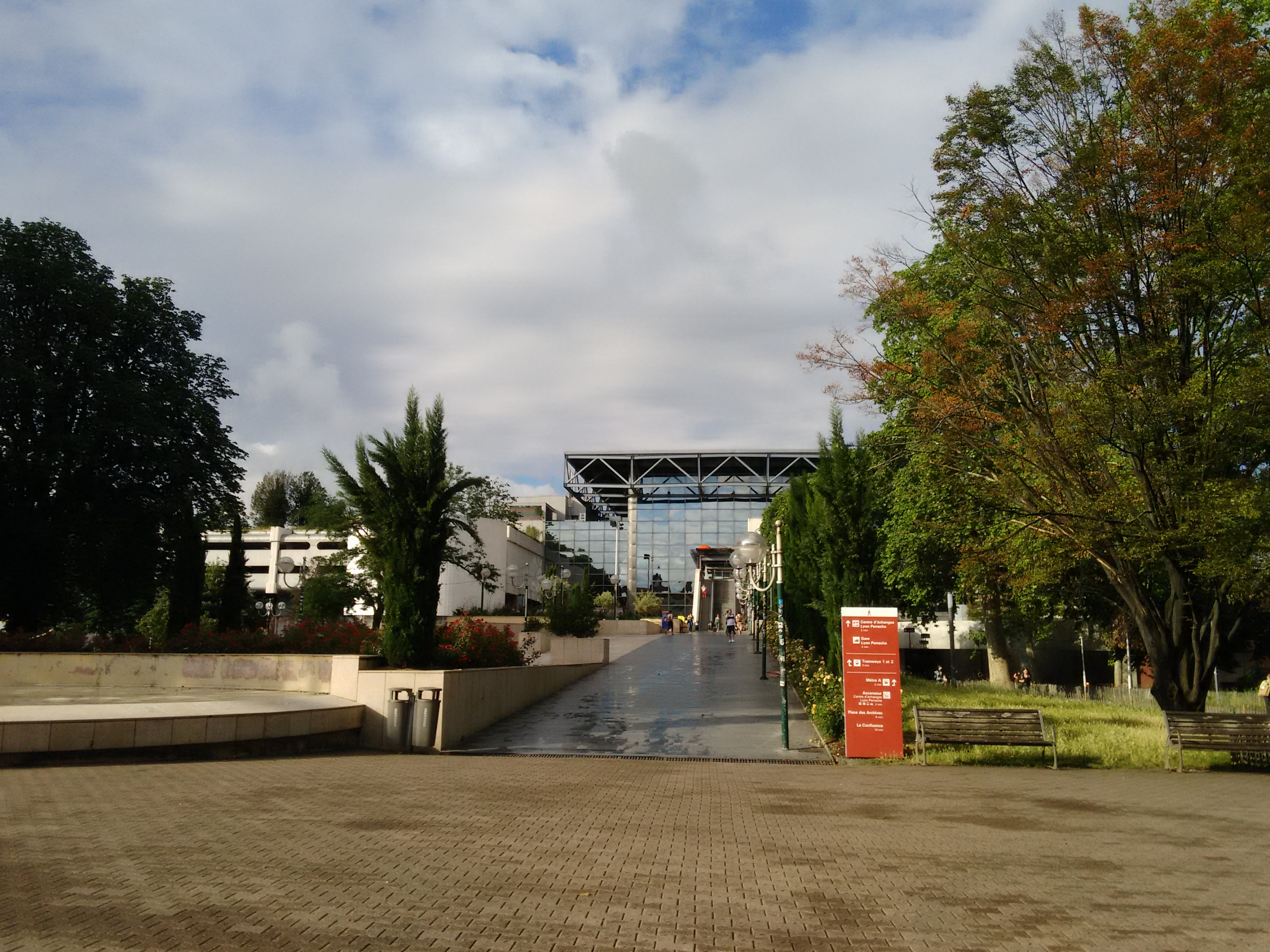
The building seen from Place Carnot (2021)

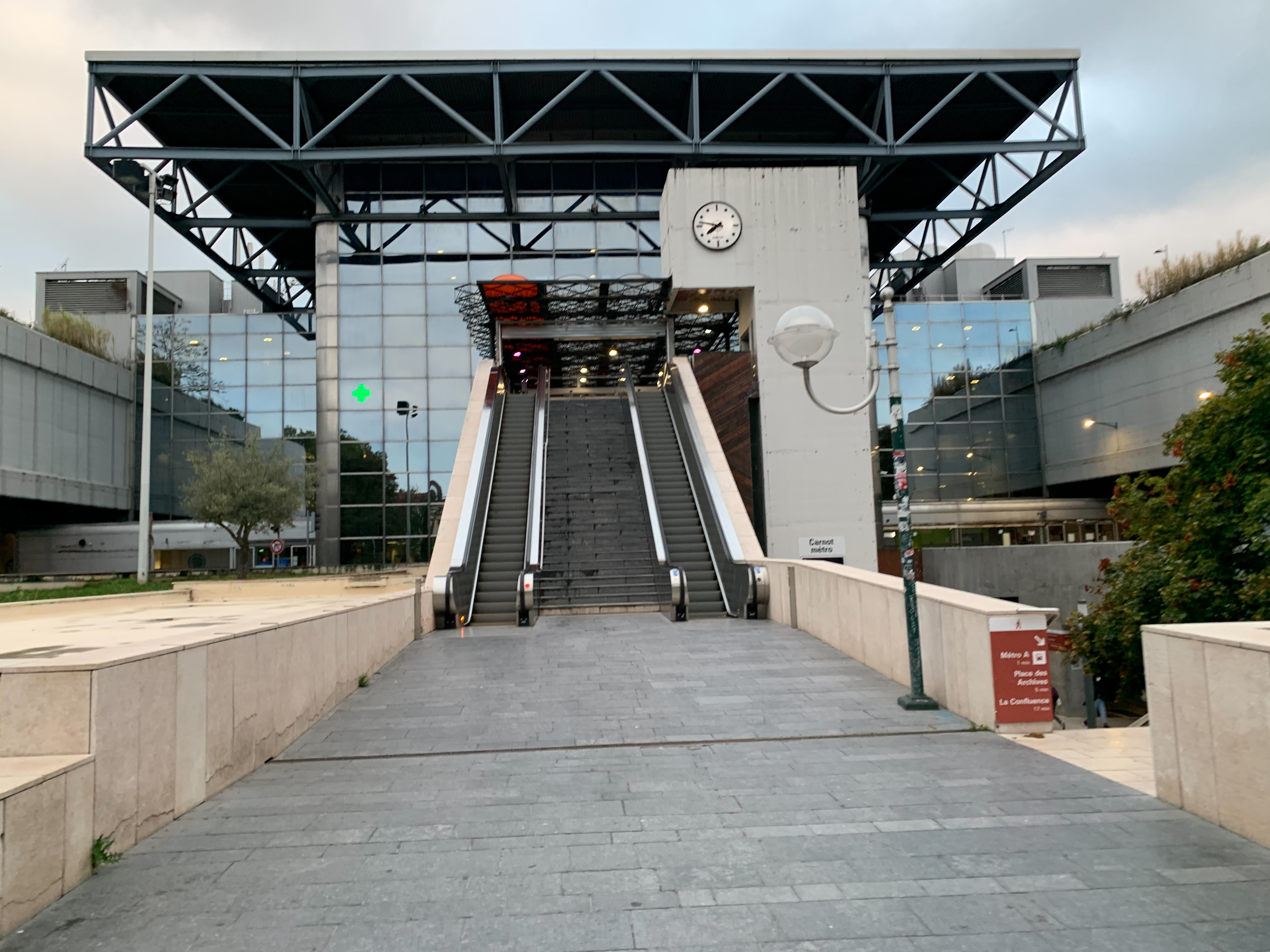
Place Carnot entrance (2021)

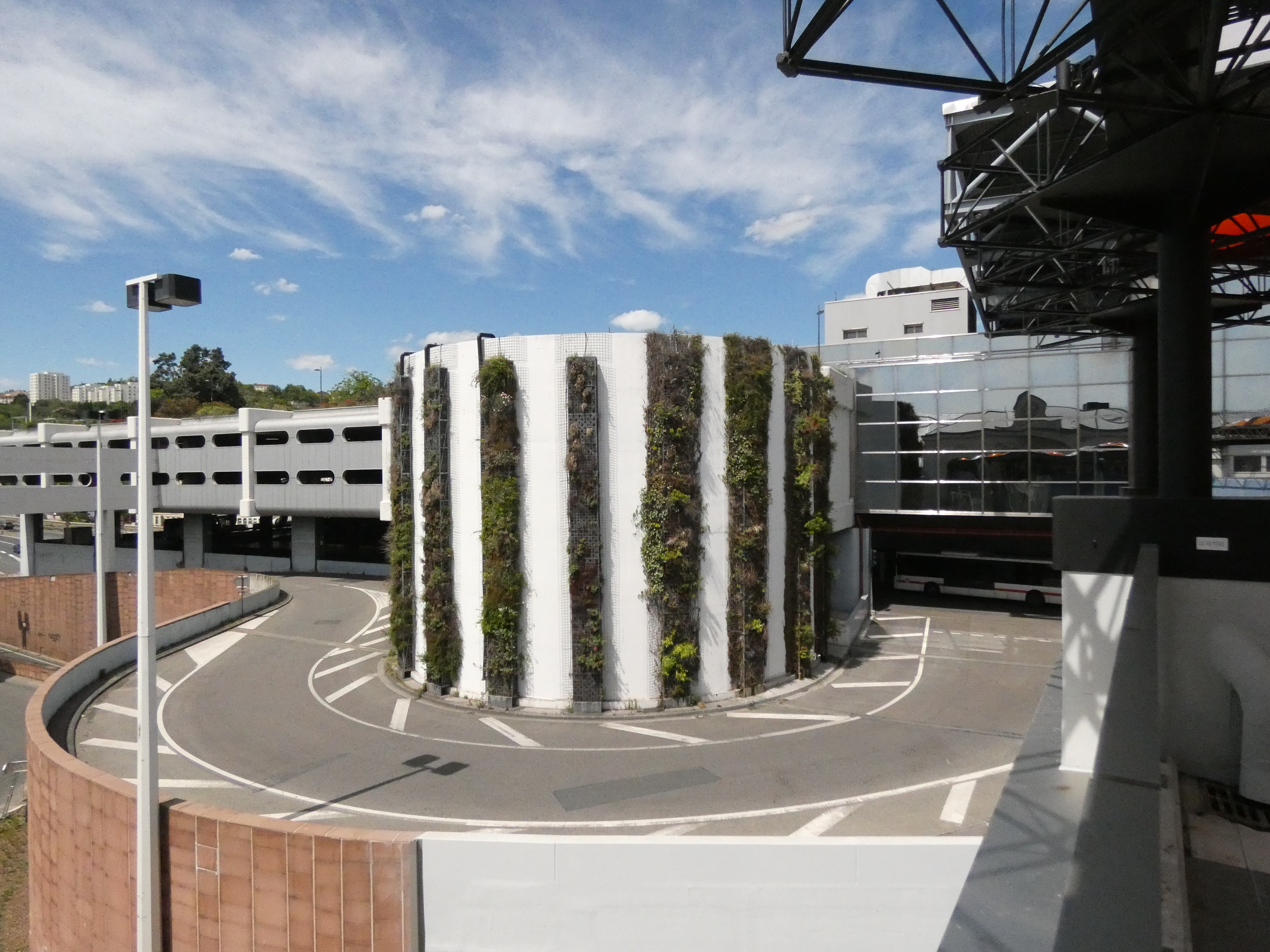

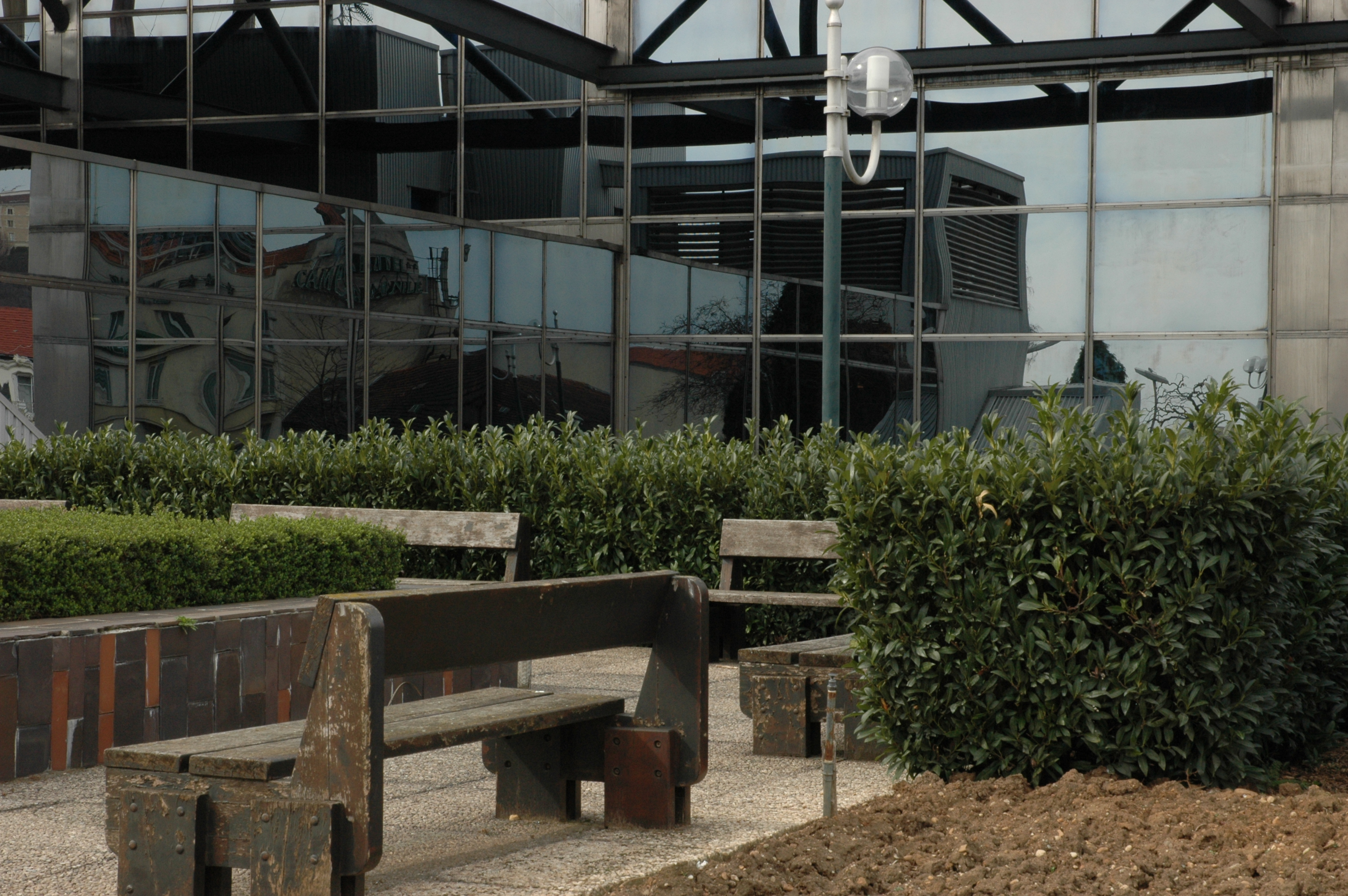
Garden on the roof of the building

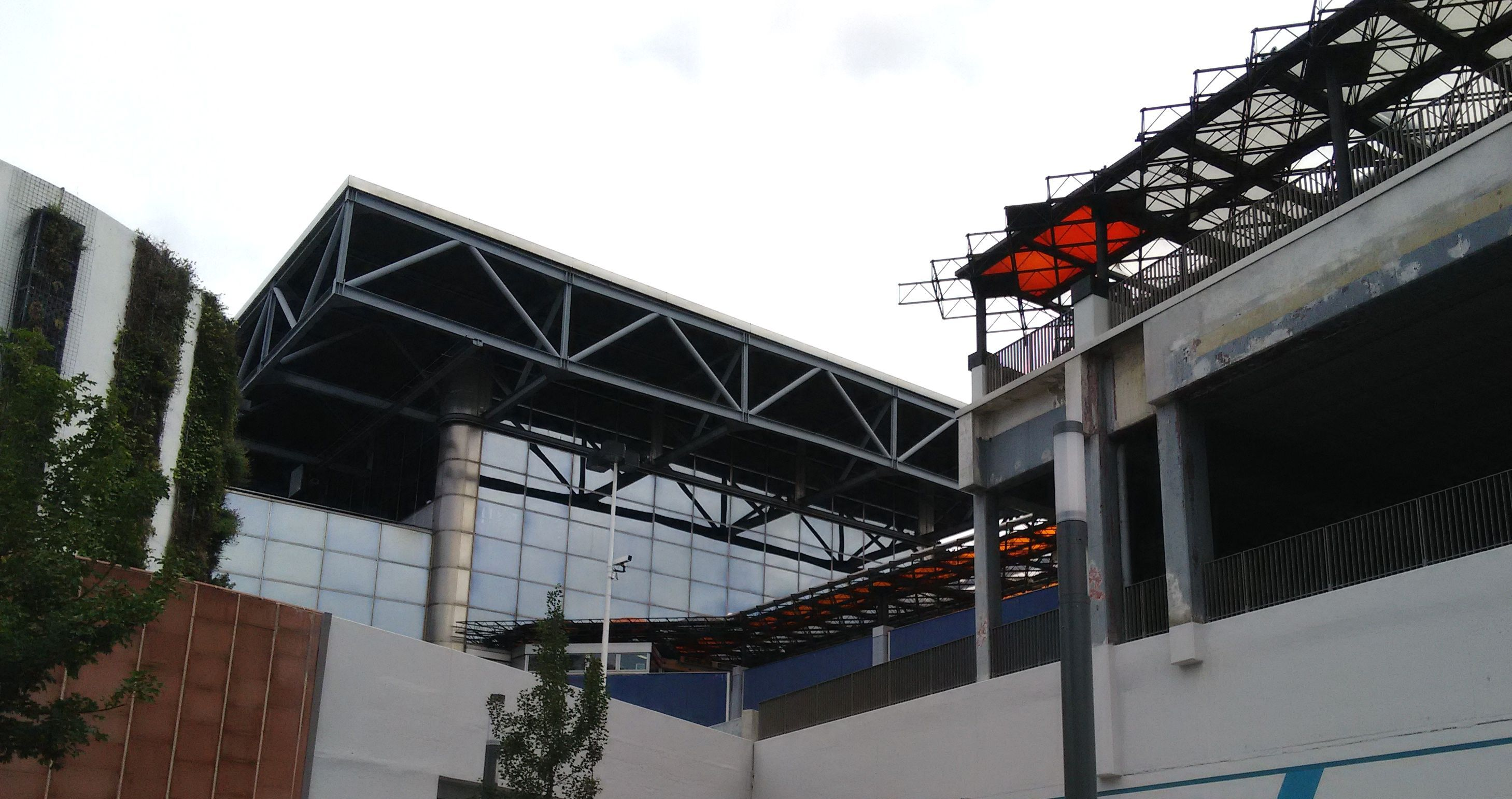
The Passage France Pejot, opened in June 2021

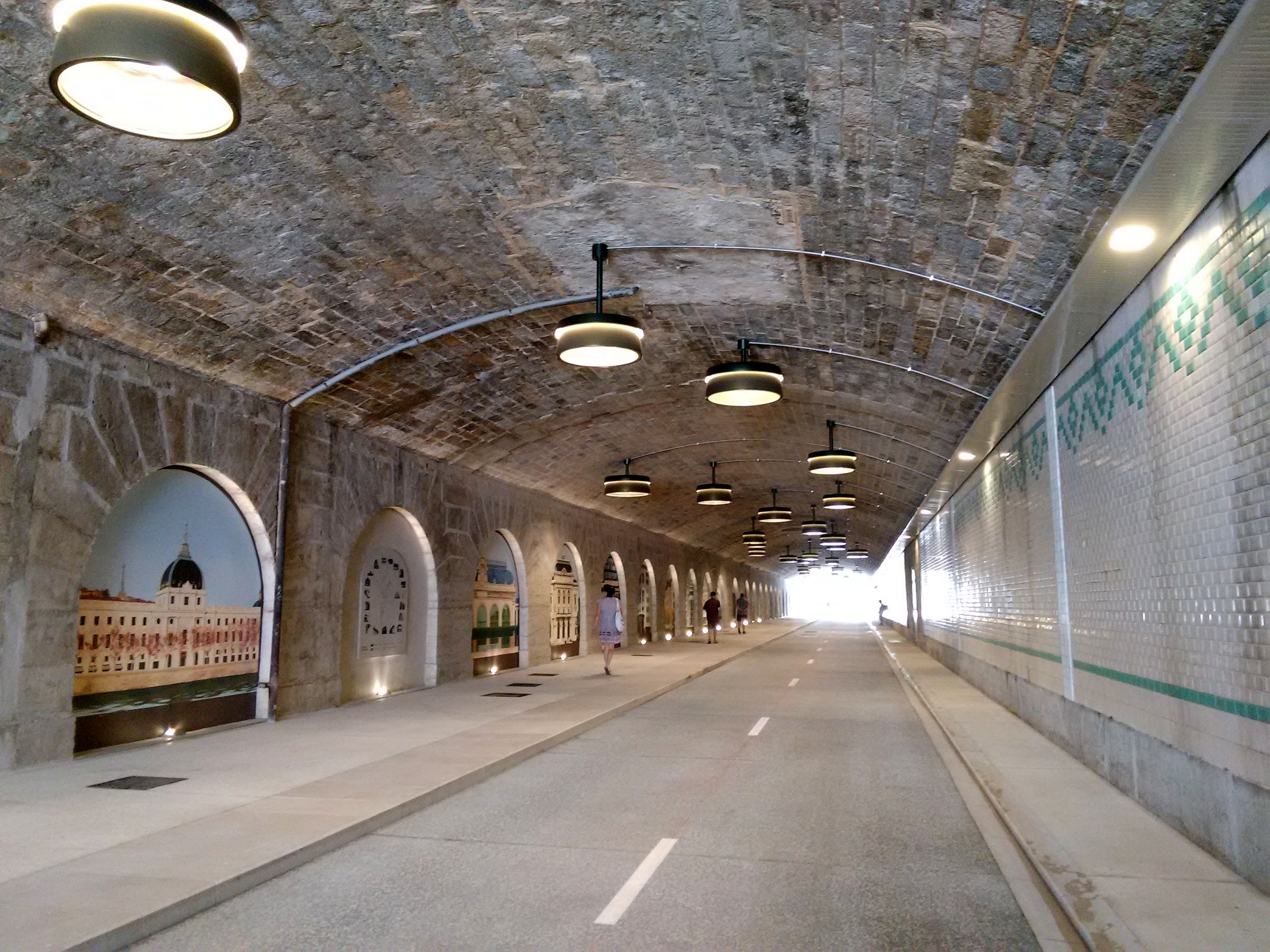
The Passage France Pejot under the railway station
