= Hollioake =

Hollioake is a surname. Notable people with the surname include:

- Adam Hollioake (born 1971), Australian-born English cricketer
- Ben Hollioake (1977–2002), Australian-born English cricketer, brother of Adam

== See also ==
- Holyoake
