= Lyon-Vaise station =

Railway station in the 9th arrondissement of Lyon, France

Coordinates: 45.780135°N 4.803781°E

Lyon-Vaise
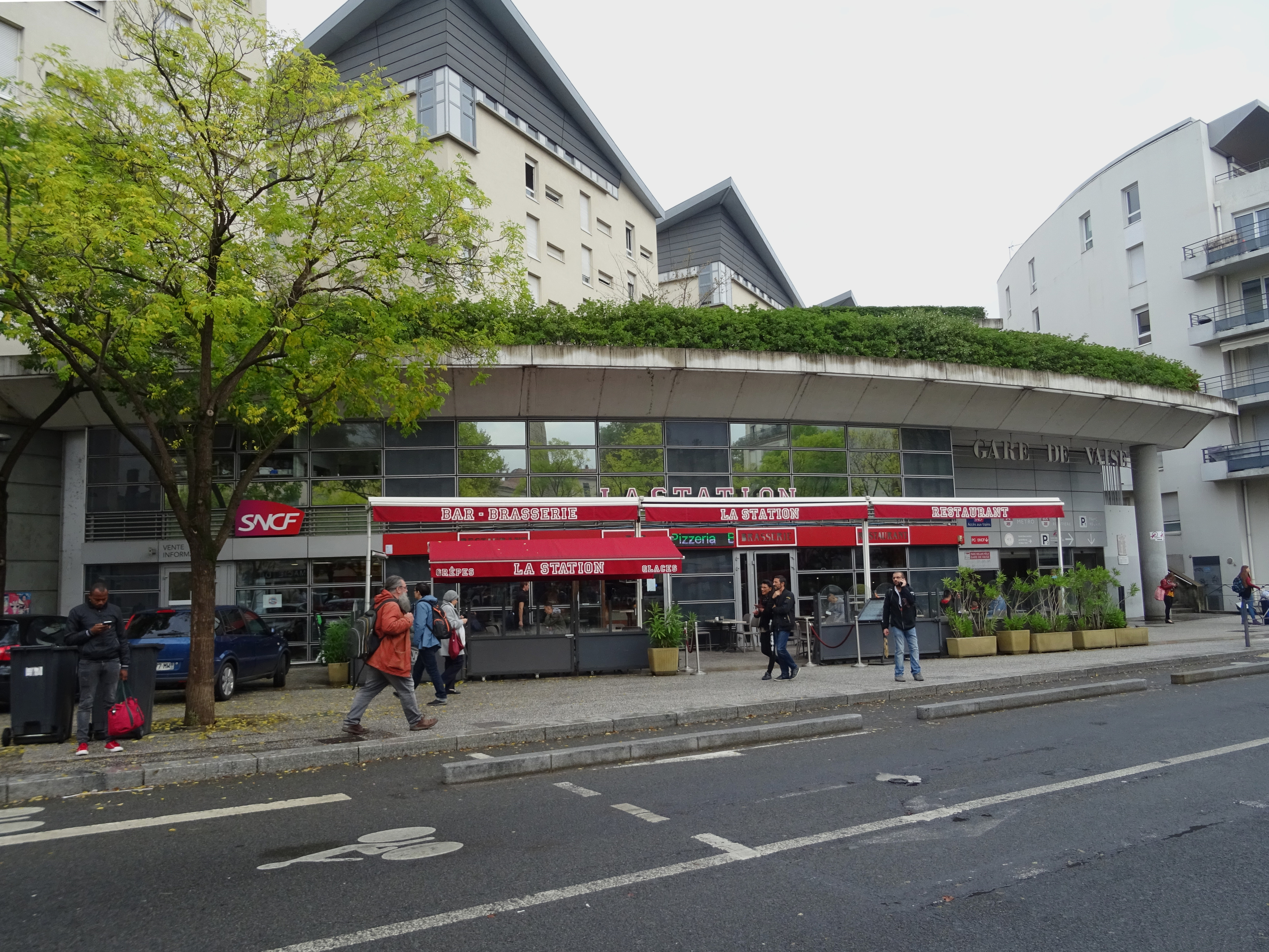
- Entrance of Lyon-Vaise station in 2019

General information
- Other names: Gare de Vaise
- Location: 9 Place de Paris; 9th arrondissement of Lyon, Metropolis of Lyon; France
- Elevation: 174 m (571 ft)
- Owner: SNCF
- Operator: SNCF
- Line: Paris–Marseille
- Platforms: 3 (including one island platform)
- Tracks: 4
- Connections: Lyon Metro Lyon Metro Line D

Construction
- Architect: François-Alexis Cendrier (original building opened in 1854); Didier-Noël Petit (multimodal hub opened in 1997)

Other information
- Station code: 87721001

History
- Opened: 10 July 1854

Passengers
- 2024: 1,060,659

Services
Preceding station	TER Auvergne-Rhône-Alpes	Following station
Terminus	5	Lyon-Perrache towards Avignon-Centre
Saint-Germain-au-Mont-d'Or towards Clermont-Ferrand	6	Lyon-Perrache Terminus
Collonges-Fontaines towards Mâcon	24	Lyon-Perrache Terminus
Lyon-Perrache towards Bourg-en-Bresse	32	Terminus
Preceding station	TER Bourgogne-Franche-Comté	Following station
Lozanne towards Nevers	TER	Lyon-Perrache Terminus

Connections to other stations
Preceding station	Lyon Metro	Following station
Terminus	Line D transfer at Gare de Vaise–Gérard Collomb	Valmy towards Gare de Vénissieux
Location

Lyon-Vaise station (French pronunciation: [ljɔ̃ vɛz]) is a railway station in Lyon, located in the district of Vaise, in the 9th arrondissement. The station is on the historical Paris–Lyon–Marseille (PLM) main line; it is also served by Lyon Metro Line D of which it is the northwestern terminus.

== History ==
From 10 July 1854 until the opening of the Saint-Irenée tunnel between Vaise and Perrache railway station on 10 October 1856, the station was the Lyon terminus of trains from Chalon-sur-Saône and Paris.

Lyon-Vaise was destroyed during the bombings of 26 May 1944. It was provisionally rebuilt in wood, then a new station was opened in 1956. In 1997, a new multimodal space was built to facilitate connections between the train, metro and bus.

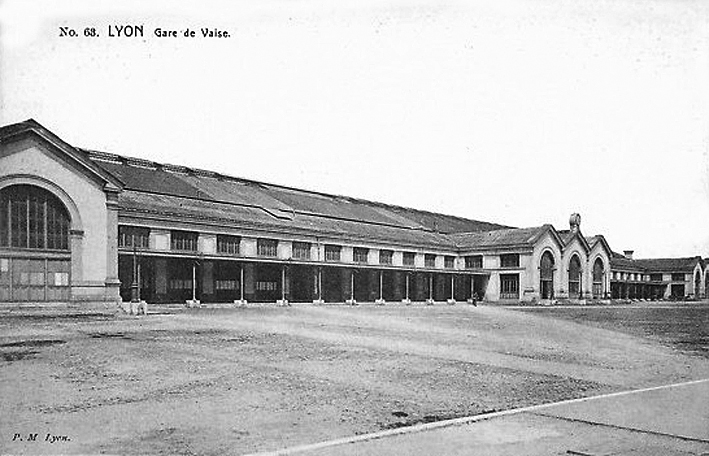
Earlier station building

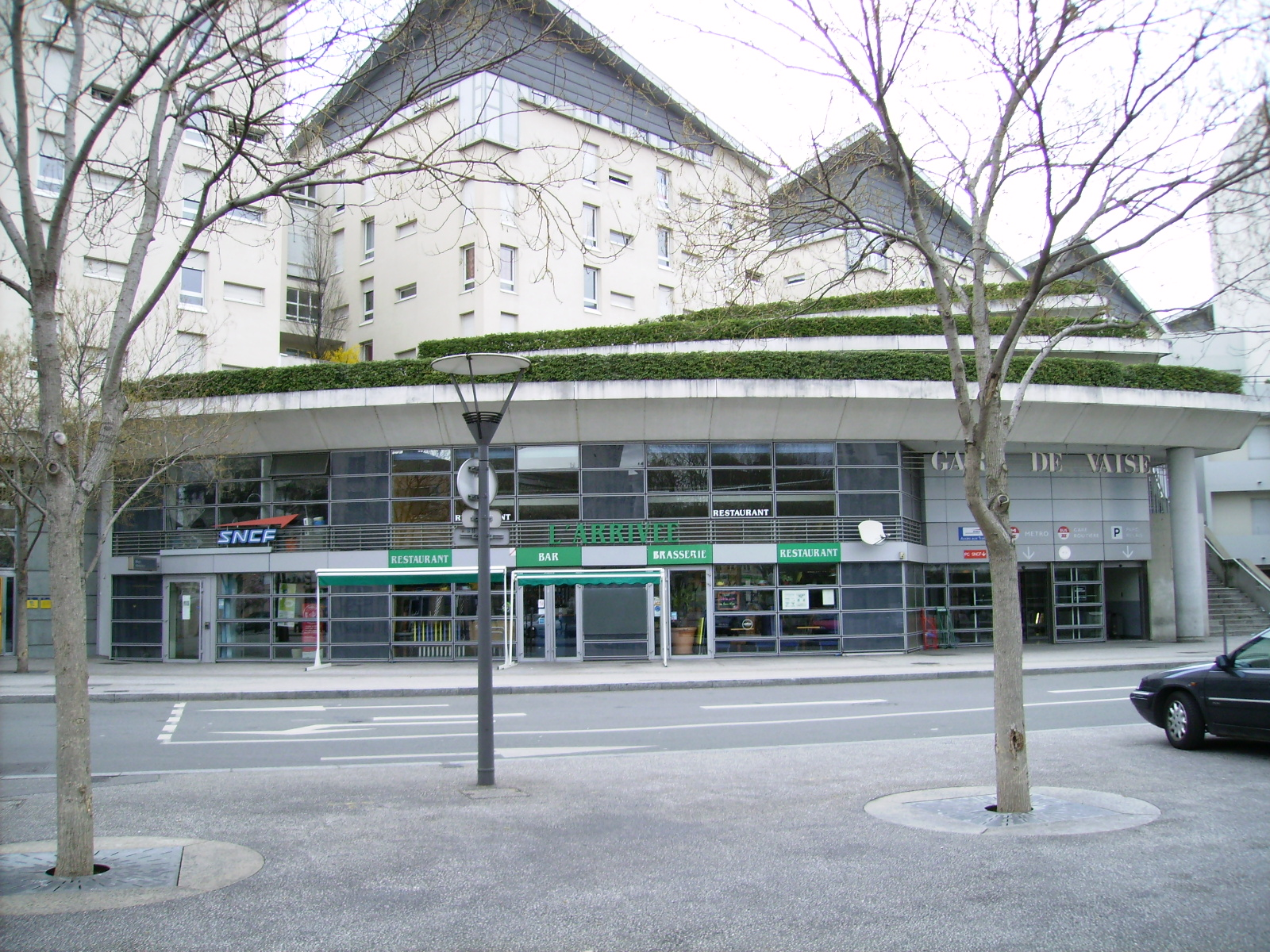
Lyon-Vaise in 2008

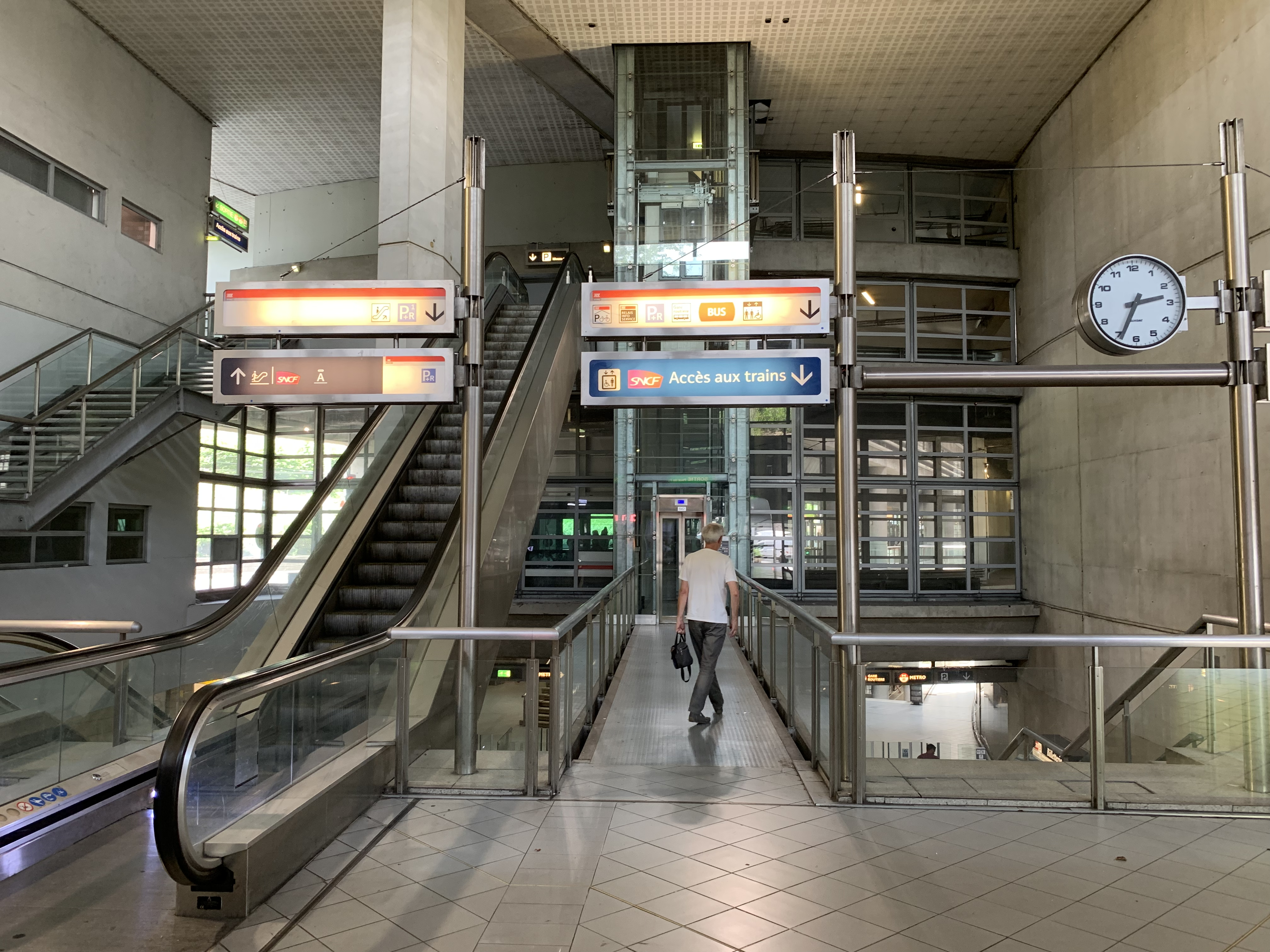
Inside the building from the street, SNCF railway station is located upstairs while métro and buses are accessible downstairs

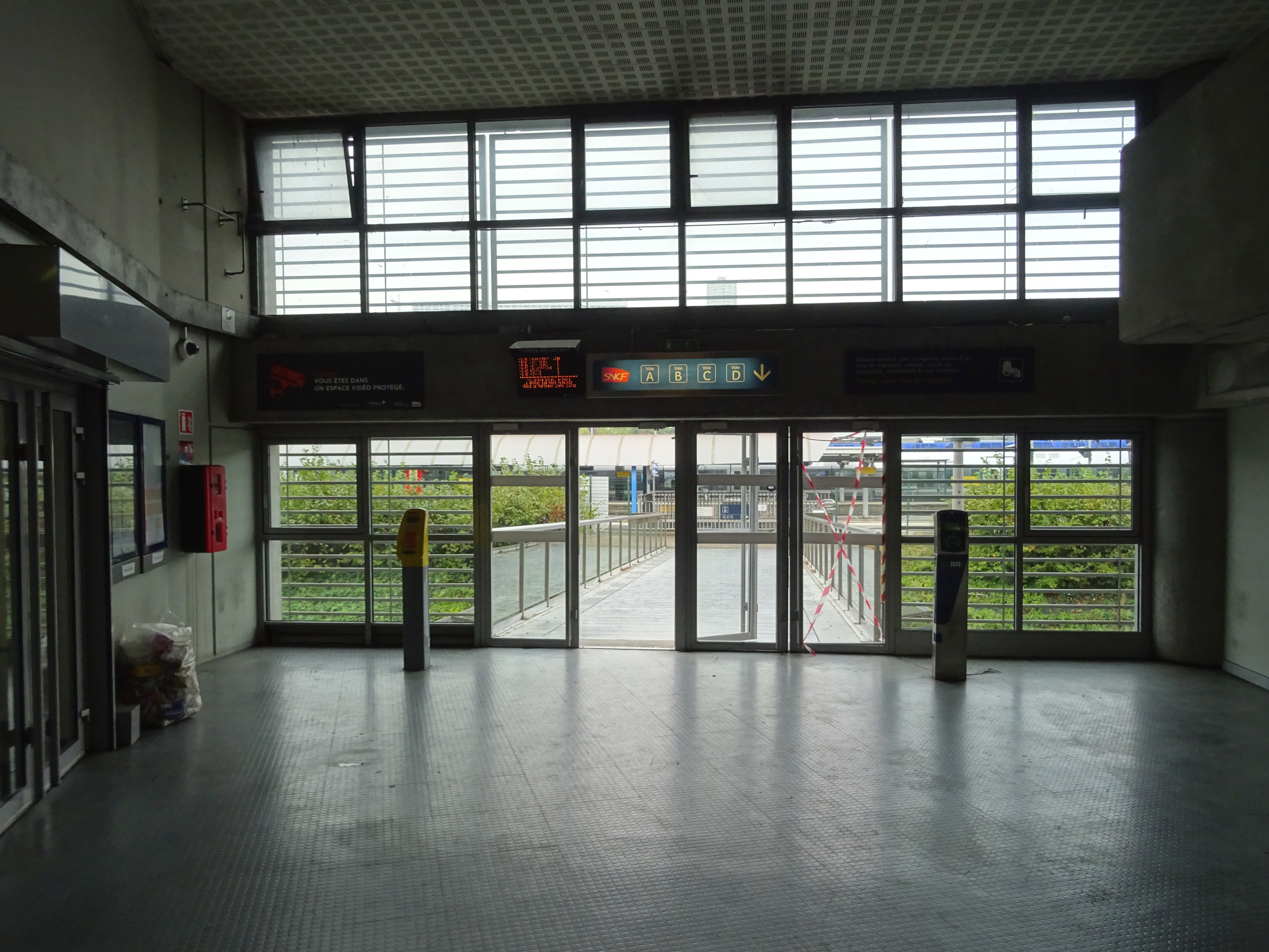
An access to the platforms

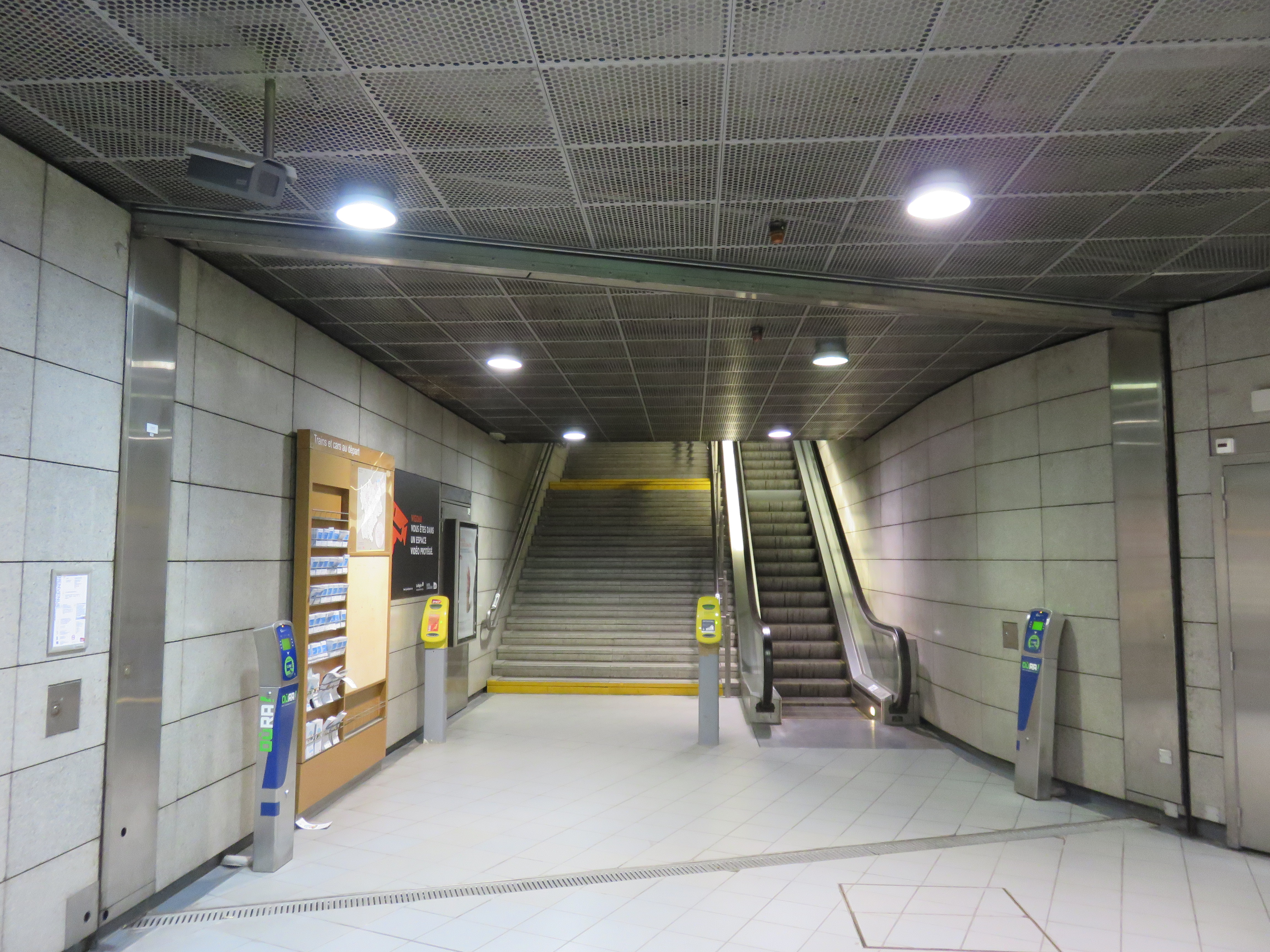
An access to the platforms

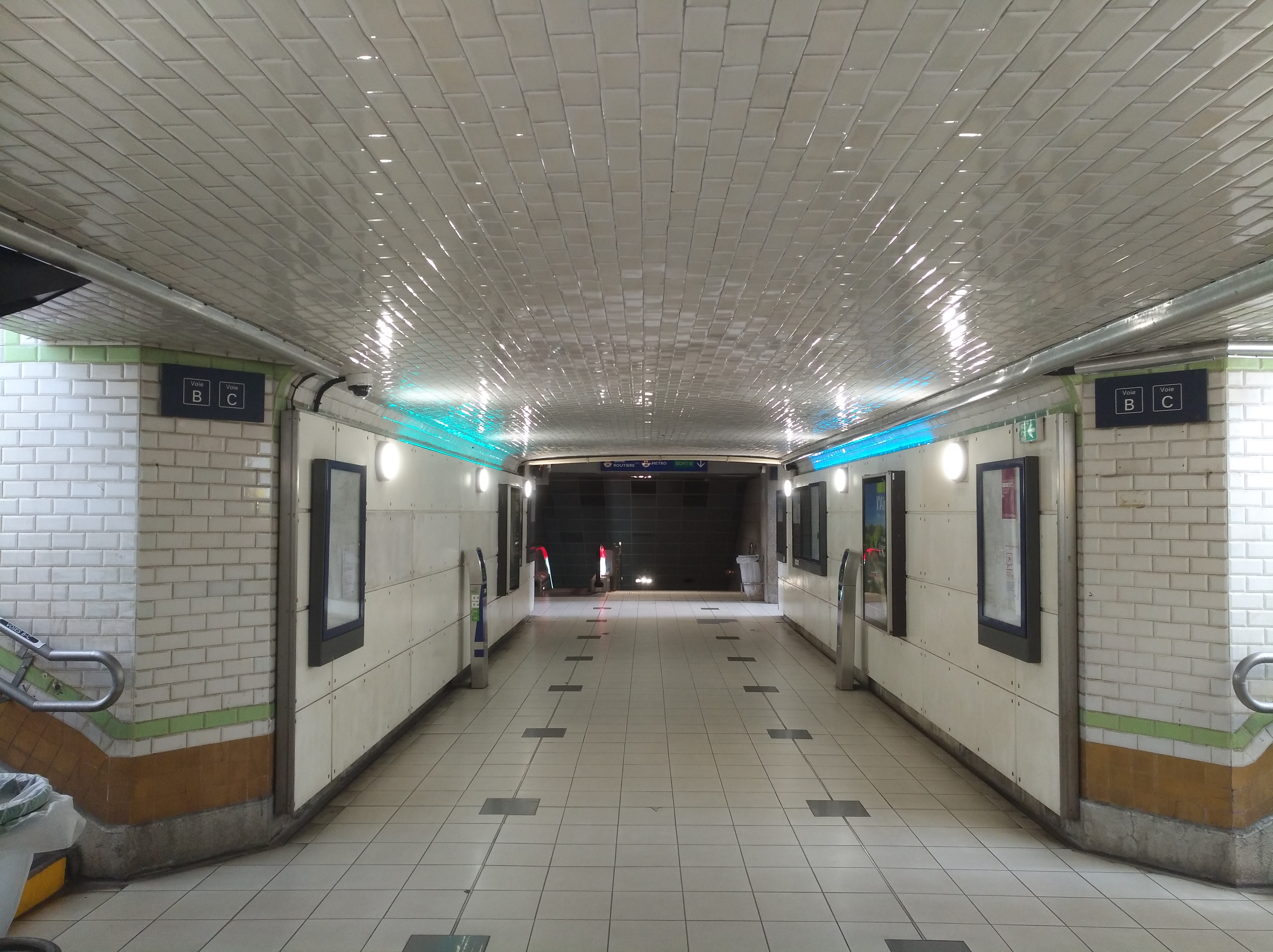
Underground passage to the platforms

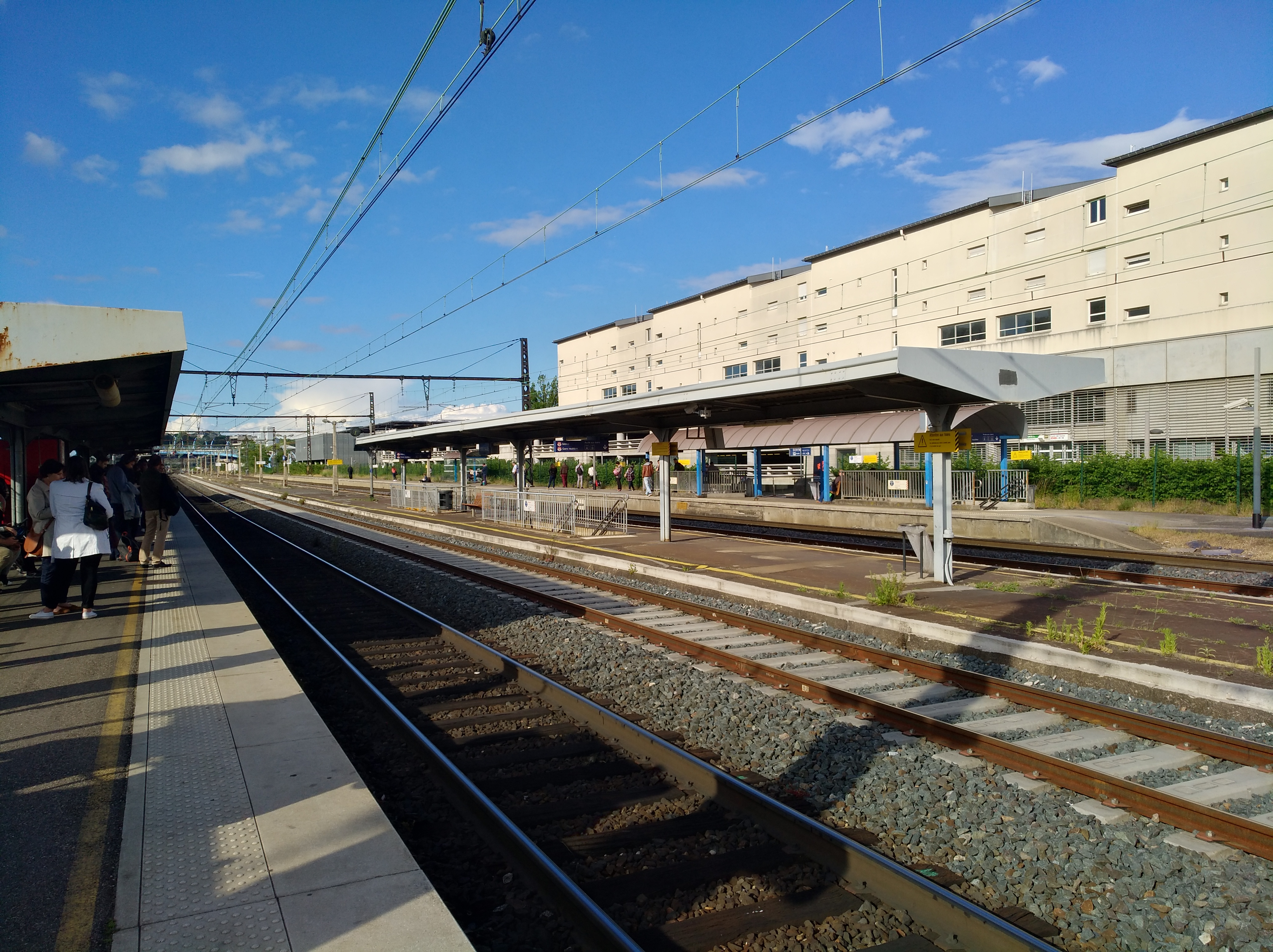
Tracks and platforms (May 2019)

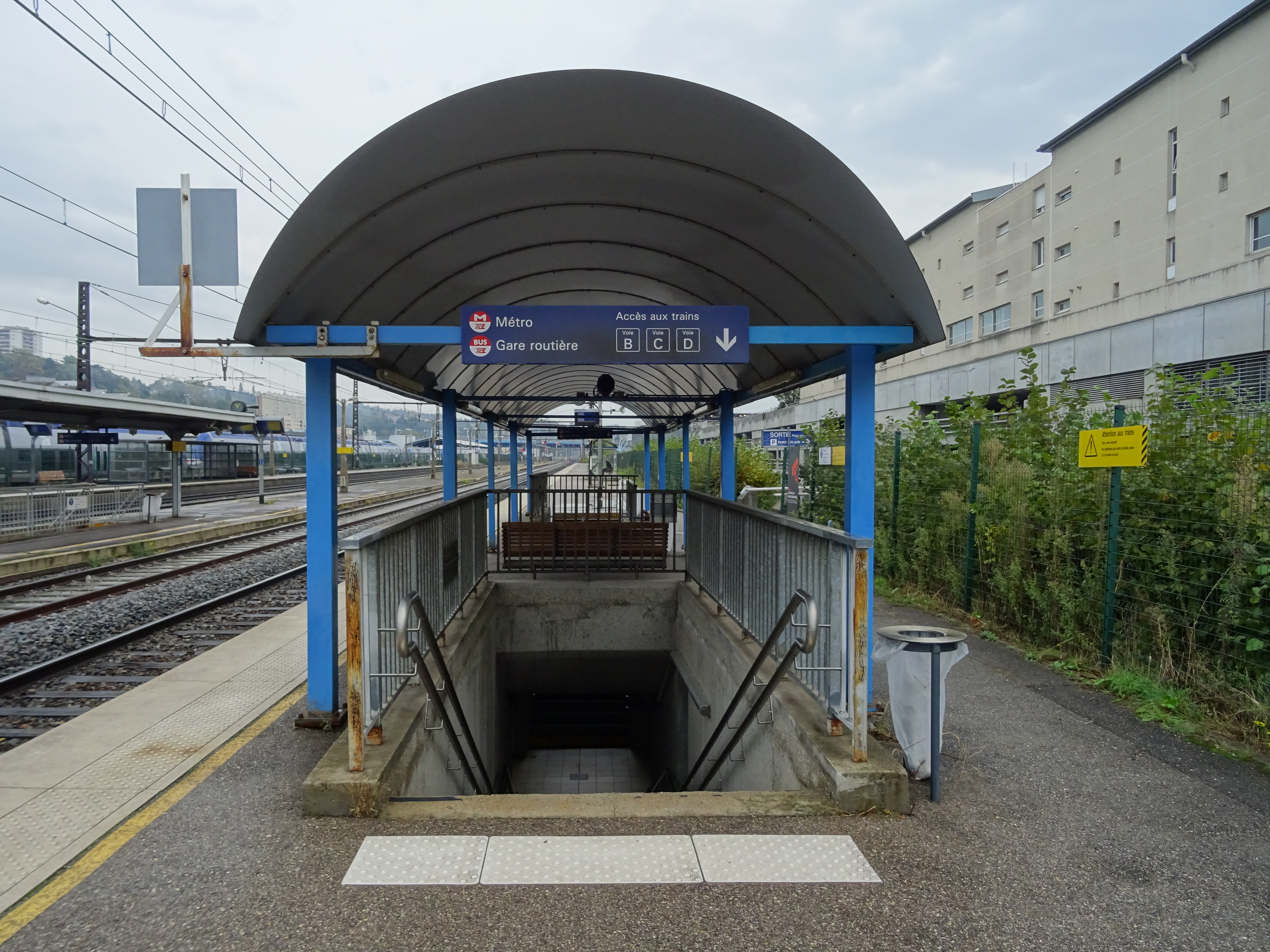
Platform of track A (October 2019)

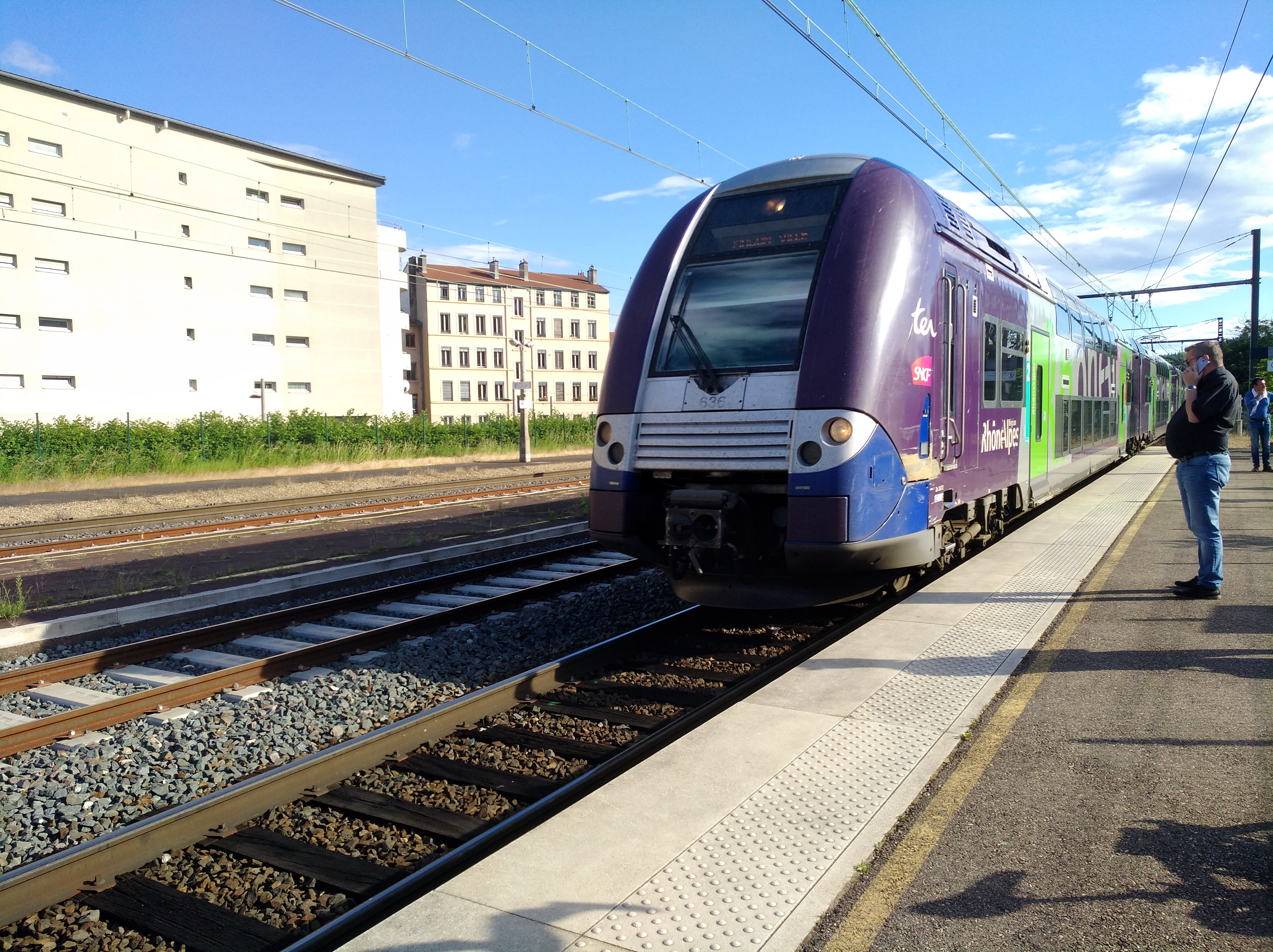
A Z 24500 on a TER to Mâcon-Ville (May 2019)

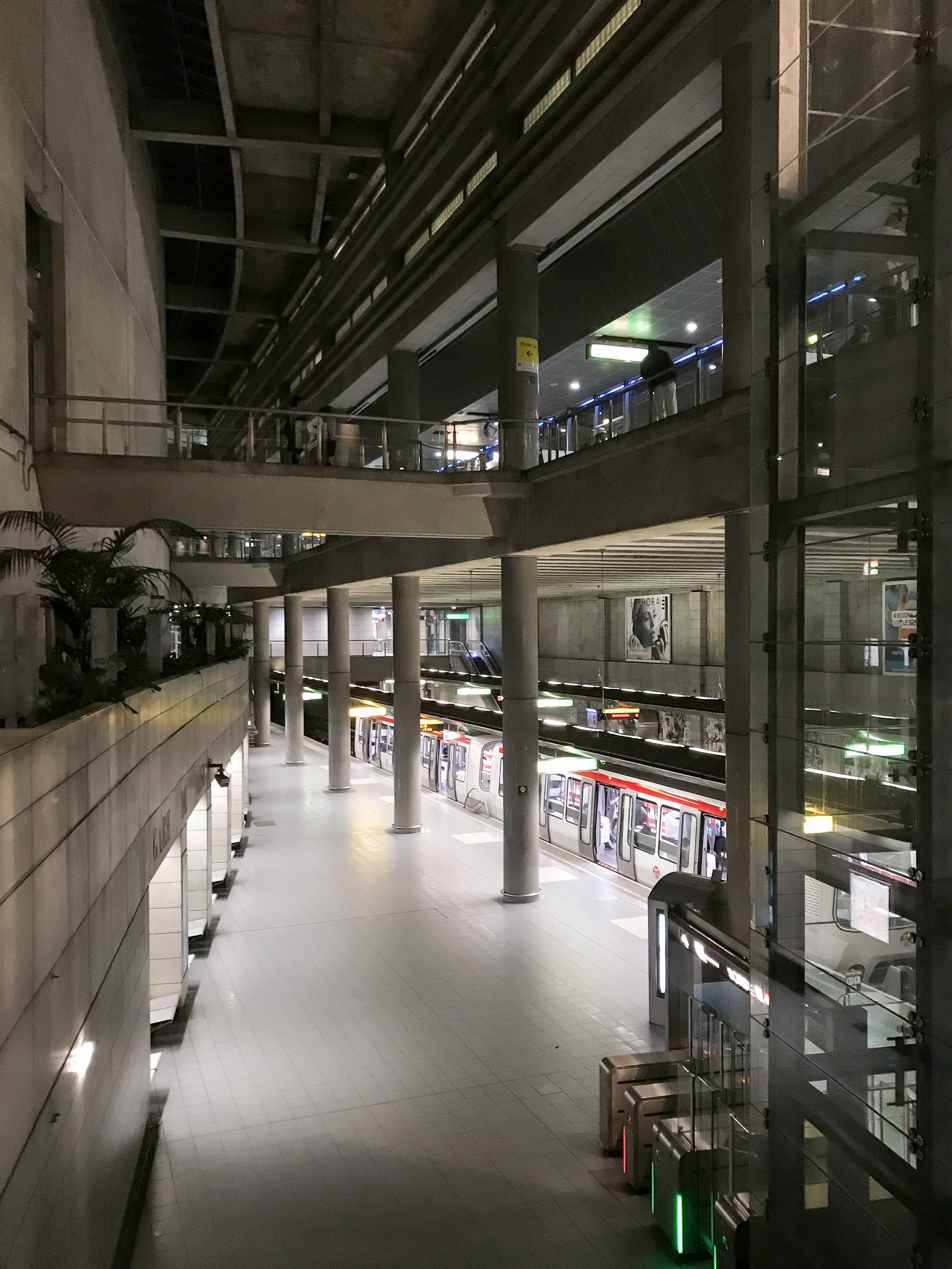
The métro station of line D

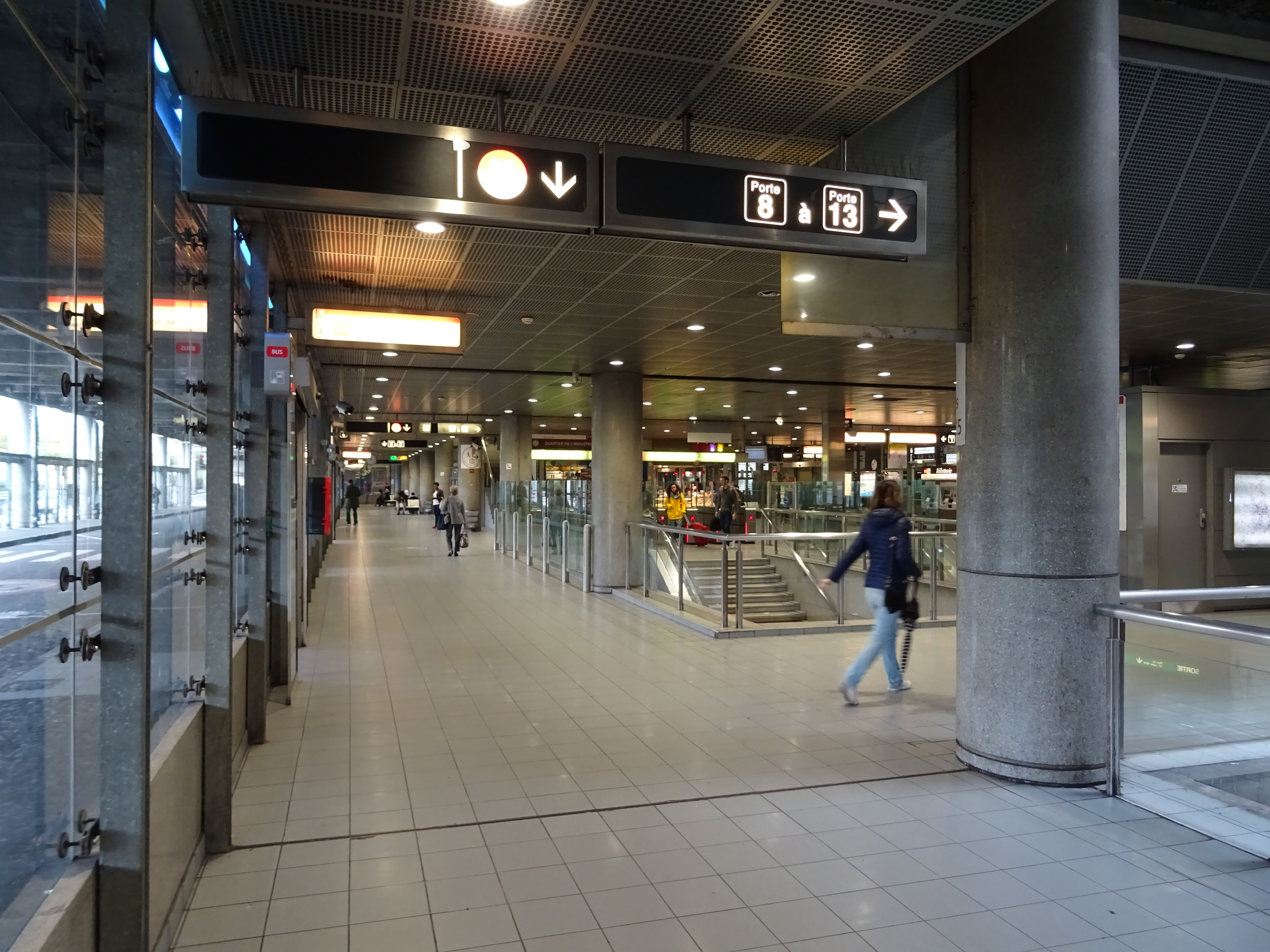
The TCL bus station served by 21 bus and trolleybus lines

== Services ==
The station is served by regional trains towards Mâcon, Nevers, Bourg-en-Bresse, Vienne and Roanne.

== See also ==
- Transport in Rhône-Alpes
- Lyon Metro
