= Henry Holyoake =

Headmaster of Rugby School

Henry Holyoake (1657–1731) was a headmaster of Rugby School for more than forty years in the 17th and 18th centuries.

== Life ==
Holyoake was probably born in Warwickshire in 1657, the son of Thomas Holyoake and Anne his wife, and the grandson of Francis Holyoake. He was elected to a choristership at Magdalen College, Oxford, which he resigned in 1676, having matriculated from that college on 12 March 1674. He became clerk and sub-librarian in 1676, appointments which he held until 1681. On 22 October 1678 he graduated B.A., proceeded M.A. on 4 July 1681, and was chaplain of his college from 1681 until 1690.

In 1687 he was elected headmaster of Rugby School. Despite the smallness of his salary and other disadvantages, he raised the school from insignificance, and was the first to engage an assistant master. He seems, however, to have unfortunately misunderstood the character of one of his best-known pupils, Edward Cave, whom he treated with undeserved severity, and eventually drove from the school. Cave, however, inserted a sympathetic obituary in the Gentleman's Magazine.

Holyoake was instituted to the rectory of Bourton-upon-Dunsmore on 30 June 1698, to that of Bilton on 31 August 1705, and to that of Harborough Magna, all in Warwickshire, on 9 November 1712. In 1700 he gave £20 for Magdalen College Library. He died unmarried at Rugby on 10 March 1730 – 1731, and was buried in St. Mary's Church, Warwick, where may be seen a quaint Latin inscription written by himself, which he directed to be engraved to his own memory as well as to that of his father and grandfather.

Holyoake's establishment at Rugby was under the domestic management of his cousin Judith Holyoake, to whom he left a legacy on the express ground of her having been 'very serviceable and seemingly kind' to the boys. He bequeathed £30 to the daughter of Widow Harris, 'his tripe-woman;’ the interest of £200 to the poor of Rugby after the death of his cousin, Elizabeth Holyoake; and all his books (since sold), together with the portraits of his father and grandfather (since lost), to Rugby School.
