= Warren Holyoak =

Australian rules footballer

Personal information
- Full name: Warren John Holyoak
- Born: 19 December 1934
- Died: 18 June 2025 (aged 90)
- Original team: Balwyn
- Height: 178 cm (5 ft 10 in)
- Weight: 79 kg (174 lb)

Playing career^{1}
Years	Club	Games (Goals)
1954	Hawthorn	7 (0)
- ^{1} Playing statistics correct to the end of 1954.

Warren John Holyoak (19 December 1934 – 18 June 2025) was an Australian rules footballer who played with Hawthorn in the Victorian Football League (VFL).
