= Ronald Holyoake =

English cricketer

Cricket information
- Batting: Left-handed

Career statistics
Competition	First-class
Matches	3
Runs scored	47
Batting average	7.83
100s/50s	0/0
Top score	22
Catches/stumpings	0/0
- Source: Cricinfo, 16 August 2022

Ronald Hubert Holyoake (17 February 1894 – 8 November 1966) was an English first-class cricketer who played three games for Worcestershire late in the 1924 season. His highest score of 22 was made in the second of these, against Nottinghamshire at New Road.

Holyoake was born in Droitwich, Worcestershire; he died in the same town at the age of 72.
