= Holly oak =

Holly oak is a name that has been used for species of oak (Quercus) with spiny leaf margins, and may refer to:

- Quercus coccifera, more often called kermes oak
- Quercus ilex, more often called holm oak

== See also ==
- Holly oak (disambiguation)
