= Thomas Holyoake =

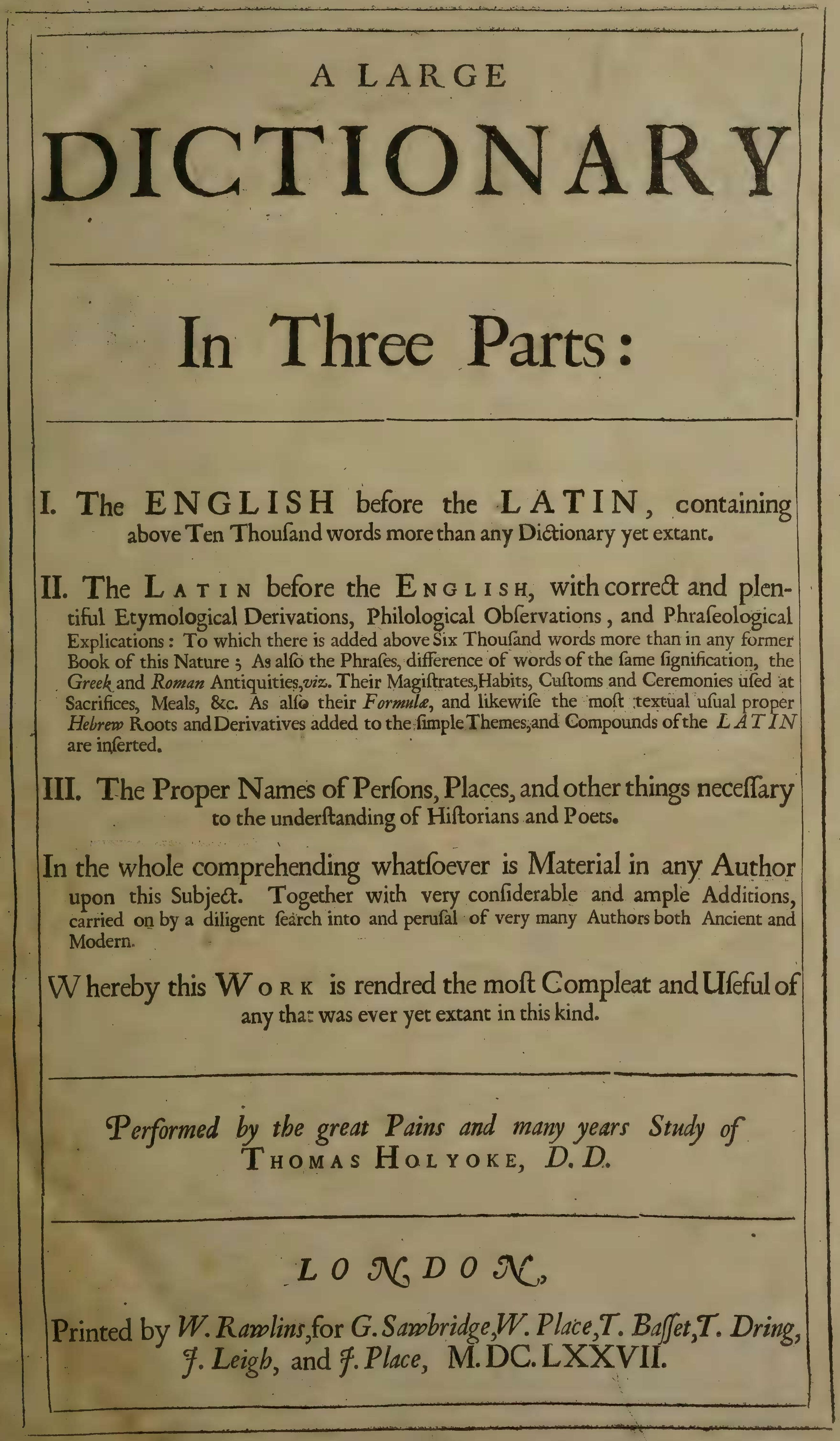
Title page from his 1677 Latin and English Dictionary published by his son two years after his death.

Thomas Holyoake (1616? – 10 June 1675) was an English royalist soldier, physician, clergyman and lexicographer.

== Life ==
He was the only son of Francis Holyoake and Judith. Born at Stoneythorpe, Warwickshire, he attended Coventry grammar school; entered Queen’s College, Oxford, in Michaelmas term 1632 (B.A. 1636; M.A. 1639) (Wood, Fasti Oxon. ed. Bliss, i. 487, 508); and became chaplain to his college.

He was chosen captain of a foot company. Consisting chiefly of undergraduates at Oxford University at the beginning of the civil war, in which capacity, doing good service to the royal cause, he was created D.D. by Charles I's express desire. After the surrender of Oxford, Holyoake obtains (in 1647) a licence from the university to practise medicine. He practised successfully in Warwickshire until the Restoration, when Thomas, Lord Leigh preferred him to the rectory of Whitnash, near Warwick. He was installed also a prebendary of the collegiate church of Wolverhampton. In 1674 Robert, Lord Brooke, presented him to the donative of Breamore in Hampshire, where he died on 10 June 1675. He was buried near his father in the church of St. Mary at Warwick. By his wife Anne he had twelve children, including Henry Holyoake.

== Works ==
Francis Holyoake, his father, had compiled a 'Dictionarie Etymologocall,’ which was annexed to 'Riders Dictionarie correct,’ 2 pts., London, 1617. The work was reissued in 1626, with additions by N. Gray, and in 1640. But Holyoake had meanwhile contributed so much to the work that a fourth edition was published as almost his own, with the title 'Dictionarium Etymologicum Latinum,’ &c., 3 pts., London, 1633. The sixth edition is stated to be 'compositum et absolutum a Francisco de Sacra Quercu,’ 1648. Thomas made great additions to the work, but, dying before he could complete the edition, it was published by Thomas's son Charles, as 'A large Dictionary in three parts,’ London 1677–1676.
