= Holyoke (disambiguation) =

Holyoke is a city in Hampden County, Massachusetts, United States.

Holyoke may also refer to:

- Holyoke, Colorado, a home rule municipality in Phillips County, Colorado
- Holyoke Publishing, an American comic book publisher
- Holyoke Range, a traprock mountain range in Massachusetts
- Mount Holyoke, a mountain in the Holyoke Range
- Elizur Holyoke, namesake of Holyoke, Massachusetts
- Keith Holyoake, a former Prime Minister of New Zealand
- Holyoke, Iowa, fictional setting of the 1999 film Whiteboyz
- Holyoke station, an Amtrak station
- Holyoke Heritage State Park
- Holyoke Automobile Company

== See also ==
- Holyoake, a surname
- Holyoak, a surname
- Holyoke Blue Sox, a baseball team in Holyoke, Massachusetts
- Holyoke Millers, a baseball team in Holyoke, Massachusetts
- Holyoke Community College, a college in Holyoke, Massachusetts
- Holyoke Mall at Ingleside, a mall in Holyoke, Massachusetts
- Mount Holyoke College, a liberal arts college in South Hadley, Massachusetts
