= Francis Holyoake =

Francis Holyoake (1567 – 13 November 1653) was an English cleric and lexicographer.

== Life ==
Holyoake was born at Nether Whitacre, Warwickshire. About 1582 he studied as a commoner at The Queen's College, Oxford, though it does not appear that he took a degree. Later he taught at a school, first at Oxford, and then in Warwickshire. In February 1604 he was instituted to the rectory of Southam, Warwickshire, In 1625 he was elected a member of Convocation.

In 1642 Holyoake was forced from his house by the parliamentarians, his wife was roughly handled, his servant was killed, and his estate of £300 per annum was sequestered, so that he and his family were obliged to subsist on charity. He died on 13 November 1653, aged 86, and was buried in the church of St. Mary at Warwick.

== Works ==
Holyoake compiled a Dictionarie Etymologocall, which was annexed to Riders Dictionarie correct, 2 pts., London, 1617, an edition of the lexicon of John Rider. The work was re-issued in 1626, with additions by Nicholas Grey, and in 1640. A fourth edition was published as almost Holyoake's own, with the title Dictionarium Etymologicum Latinum, 3 pts., London, 1633. The sixth edition is stated to be compositum et absolutum a Francisco de Sacra Quercu, 1648. His son Thomas made major additions to the work, but, dying before he could complete the edition, it was published by Thomas’s son Charles, as A large Dictionary in three parts, London 1677–1676.

Francis Holyoake presented a manuscript to Queen's College library, entitled Huguccionis, seu Huguitionis, Pisani, ep. Ferrariensis, Lexicon alphabeticum.
