= Lyon-Perrache station =

Railway station in Lyon, France

Lyon–Perrache
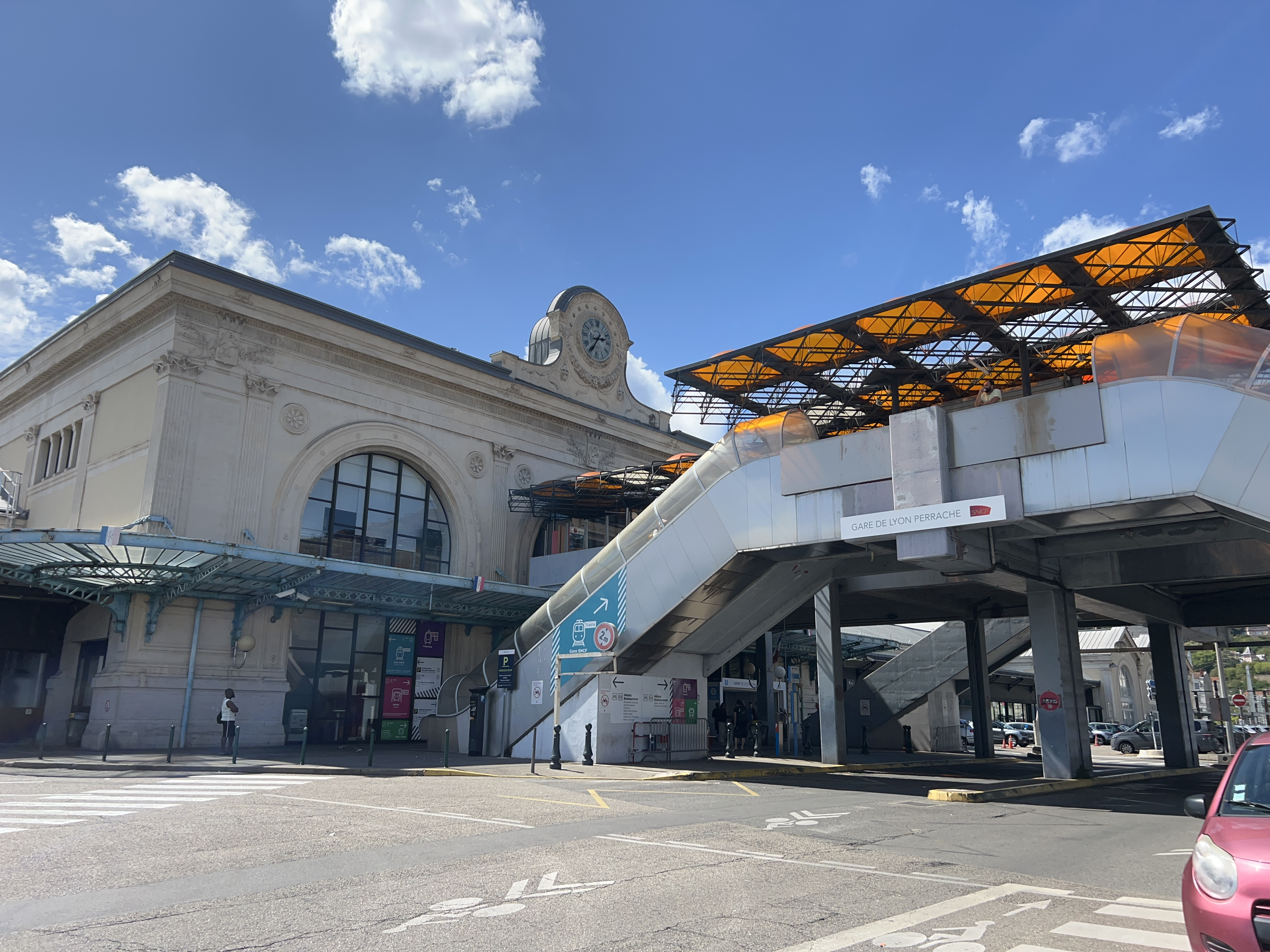
- The frontage of the station in 2026.

General information
- Location: 14 Cours de Verdun; Perrache, 2nd arrondissement of Lyon; France
- Coordinates: 45.7483°N 4.8256°E
- Elevation: 174 m (571 ft)
- Owner: SNCF
- Operator: SNCF
- Lines: Paris–Marseille; Moret–Lyon; Lyon–Marseille (via Grenoble); Lyon–Geneva
- Connections: (Perrache Multimodal Hub)

Construction
- Accessible: Yes
- Architect: François-Alexis Cendrier

Other information
- Station code: 87722025

Passengers
- 2024: 7,871,334
Services
Preceding station	SNCF	Following station
Lyon-Part-Dieu towards Paris-Lyon	TGV inOui	Terminus
Lyon-Part-Dieu towards Nantes	Intercités	Terminus
Preceding station	Ouigo	Following station
Lyon-Part-Dieu towards Paris-Bercy	Train Classique	Terminus
Preceding station	TER Auvergne-Rhône-Alpes	Following station
Terminus	1	Lyon-Jean Macé towards Saint-André-le-Gaz
Lyon-Vaise Terminus	5	Lyon-Jean Macé towards Avignon-Centre
Lyon-Vaise towards Roanne	6	Terminus
Lyon-Part-Dieu towards Clermont-Ferrand	6	Terminus
Oullins towards Saint-Étienne	10	Terminus
Lyon-Vaise towards Mâcon	24	Terminus
Lyon-Part-Dieu towards Bourg-en-Bresse	32	Lyon-Vaise Terminus
Preceding station	TER Bourgogne-Franche-Comté	Following station
Lyon-Vaise towards Nevers	TER	Terminus
Connections to other stations
Preceding station	Lyon Metro	Following station
Terminus	Line A transfer at Perrache	Ampère–Victor Hugo towards Vaulx-en-Velin–La Soie
Preceding station	Lyon tramway	Following station
Place des Archives towards Debourg	Line T1 transfer at Perrache	Quai Claude Bernard towards La Doua–IUT Feyssine
Place des Archives towards Hôtel de Région–Montrochet	Line T2 transfer at Perrache	Centre Berthelot–Sciences Po Lyon towards Saint-Priest–Bel Air
Location
- Location within France Location within Auvergne-Rhône-Alpes Location within Europe

Lyon–Perrache or simply Perrache (French: Gare de Lyon-Perrache, [ɡaʁ də ljɔ̃ pɛʁaʃ]) is a large railway station located in the Perrache quarter, in the 2nd arrondissement of Lyon, France. Historically the primary railway station in Lyon, today it is the city's second-busiest station, after the newer Lyon-Part-Dieu station.

Opened in 1857 on Lyon's Presqu'île, the station is located on the Paris–Marseille railway, Lyon–Geneva railway and Moret–Lyon railway. The train services are operated by the SNCF and include TGV, Intercités, TER and international services.

== History ==
The station was built in 18 months starting in 1855 by François-Alexis Cendrier for the Chemin de fer de Paris à Lyon. From the beginning it was designed as a central station unifying the lines of the three companies then serving Lyon, which merged to form the Chemins de fer de Paris à Lyon et à la Méditerranée (PLM) as the station was opening. The building was built in classical style and is composed of a double rooftop and a large passenger building.

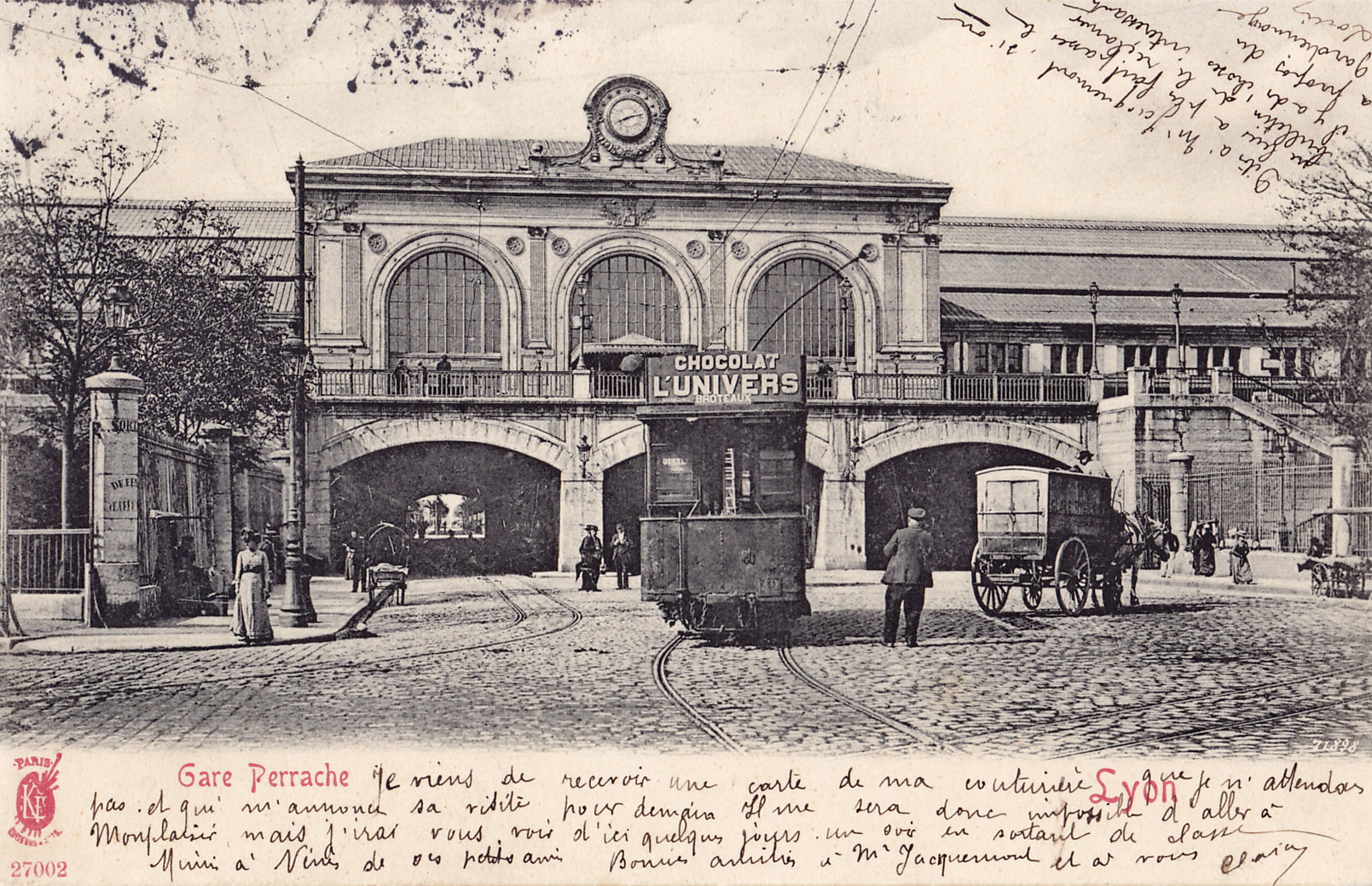
The station's façade in 1903

The station lost its view of the city when an intermodal terminal (combining local public transit and intercity buses) and dual-carriageway highway were built in front of it in the 1970s. Although much modern building has somewhat tarnished the look of the area, the station retains many of its original features:

- The station front features the names of towns served by trains departing Lyon-Perrache.
- The platforms are covered by two twin iron rooftops.

It is the terminus of Lyon services to and from Paris on the high-speed LGV Sud-Est railway line. It is also served by conventional trains from other parts of France, and is a terminus of Line A of the Lyon Metro. It is also served by Lyon tramway lines T1 and T2.

Today, Perrache is no longer the primary rail station serving Lyon. Instead, Lyon-Part-Dieu station, constructed in the 1970s in a large planned business district outside the central city, acts as the more popular embarkation point for most high-speed trains, especially to Paris and the north.

Two new through platformss opened on 29 November 1998. Prior to this trains had to reverse a few hundred metres west before continuing south.

== Future ==
A rebuilding of the station is planned for completion by 2030, with a view to improving the intermodal terminal, which by then will be half a century old.

== Train services ==
To: Saint-Étienne, Roanne, Bourgoin-Jallieu, Villefranche-sur-Saône, Vienne, Bourg-en-Bresse and Ambérieu.

The station is served by the following services:

- High speed services (TGV) Paris - Lyon
- Intercity services (Intercités) Nantes - Tours - Bourges - Lyon
- Intercity services (Ouigo) Paris - Dijon - Lyon
- Regional services (TER Auvergne-Rhône-Alpes) Lyon - Ambérieu - Bellegarde - Genève
- Regional services (TER Auvergne-Rhône-Alpes) Lyon - Valence - Montélimar - Orange - Avignon
- Local service (TER Auvergne-Rhône-Alpes) Lyon - Ambérieu - Aix-les-Bains - Chambéry

On 5 April 2022, Trenitalia France introduced a shortworking service of the Milan–Paris Frecciarossa between Lyon-Perrache and Paris Gare de Lyon, with an intermediate stop in Lyon-Part-Dieu. Three trains in each direction per day were initially scheduled, increasing to five trains from 1 June 2022.

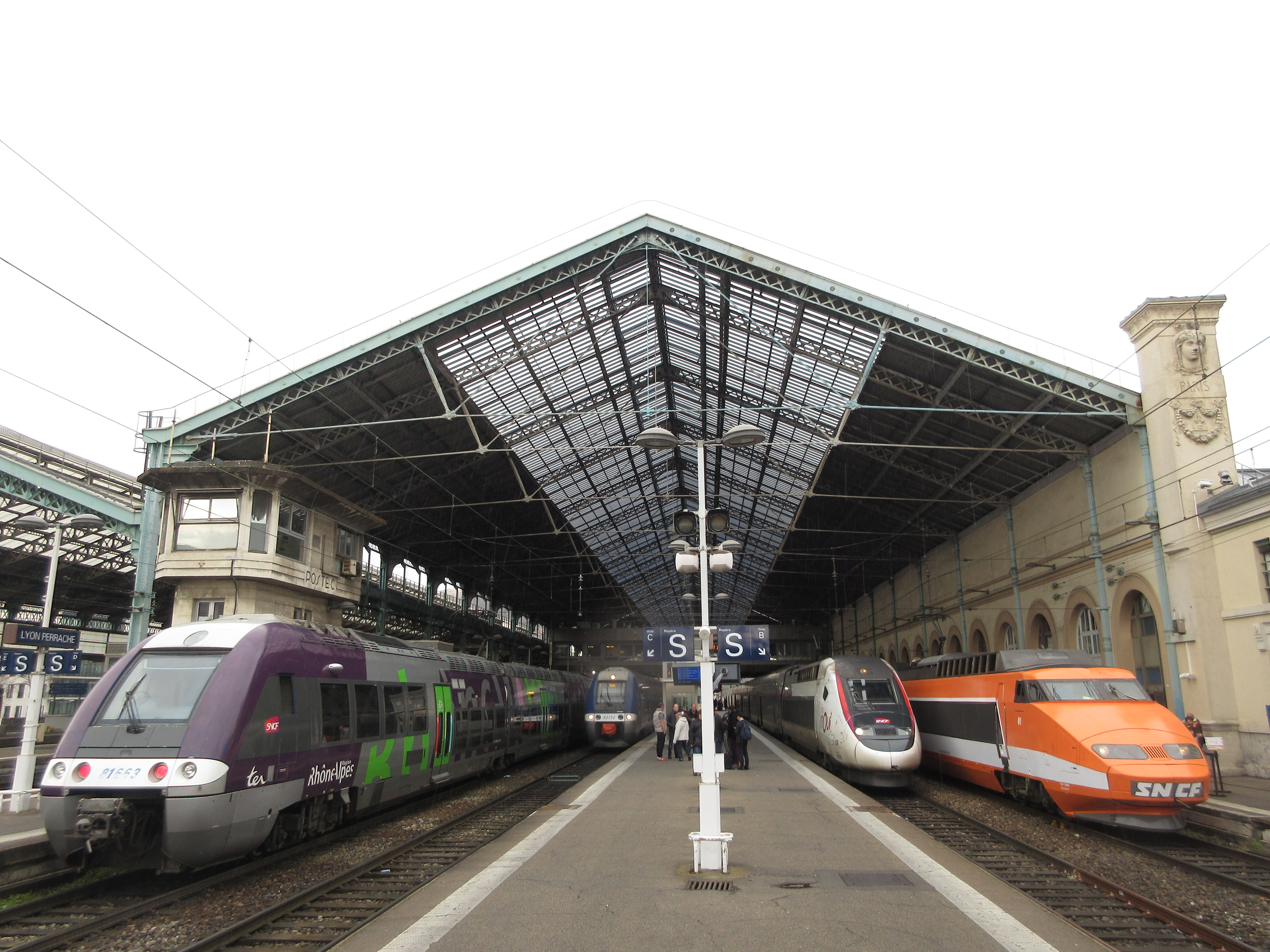
Platform

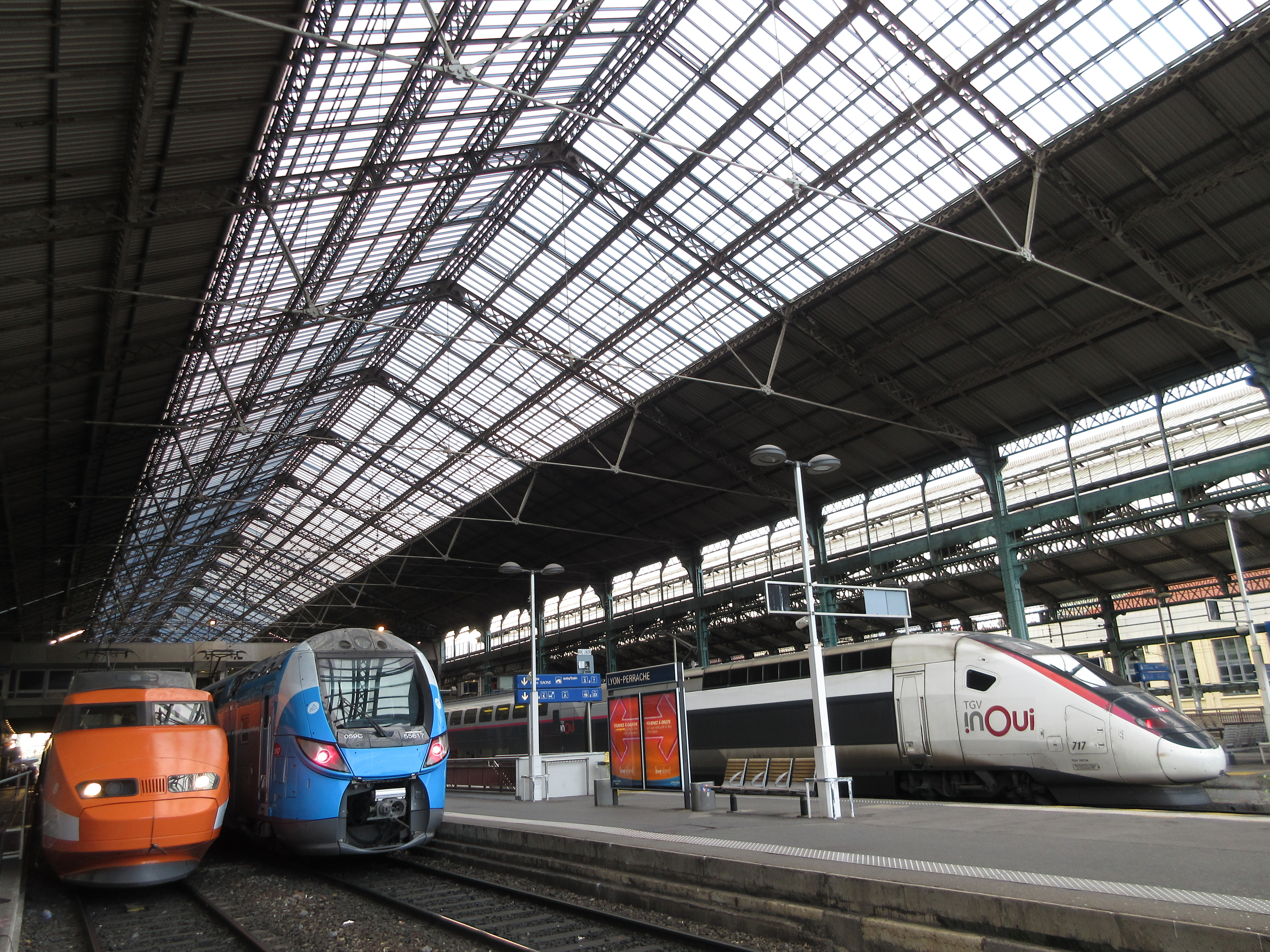
Glass roof

== iDBus ==
Since 17 December 2012, SNCF's national and international coach network, iDBus, serves Lyon-Perrache.

- Paris - Lyon
- Paris - Lyon - Milan
- Paris - Lyon - Turin
- London - Paris Charles de Gaulle Airport - Lyon
- Paris Charles de Gaulle Airport - Lyon
- Lyon - Barcelona

== See also ==
- Hôtel Terminus
