= Holy Oak =

Canadian-American singer-songwriter (born 1986)

- Also known as: Holy Oak
- Born: Neil Holyoak; June 24, 1986 (age 40)
- Origin: Montreal, Canada / United States
- Genres: Folk; alternative country; country; indie folk
- Instruments: guitar, vocals
- Years active: 2009–present
- Website: www.holyoakmusic.com

Neil Holyoak is a Canadian-American singer-songwriter. Living a nomadic life between Montreal, Hong Kong, British Columbia, and Los Angeles, he performs with a shifting band that comes together under the banner Holy Oak. Holy Oak's sound is a mix of folk influences intertwined with indie rock experimentation and poetic lyrics.

== Music ==
Neil Holyoak's music has been referred to as folk/country with a surrealist twist. There is careful attention to poetry in lyrical composition and storytelling in Holy Oak's songs. There is often an exploration of beauty coexisting in the face of melancholia in his music.

Holyoak has created four studio albums, working with well respected musicians and producers in Montreal including Howard Bilerman of Arcade Fire, Nick Kuepfer, Dave Smith, and Dave Bryant of Godspeed You Black Emperor.

=== Discography ===
==== Studio albums ====
- Holy Oak – Holy Oak (2008)
- Better Lions – Holy Oak (2010)
- Silver Boys – Holy Oak (2013)
- Rags Across The Sun – Neil Holyoak (2014)
- Second Son – Holy Oak (2017)
