= Perrache (quarter) =

Neighbourhood in Lyon, France

Coordinates: 45°44′39″N 4°49′20″E

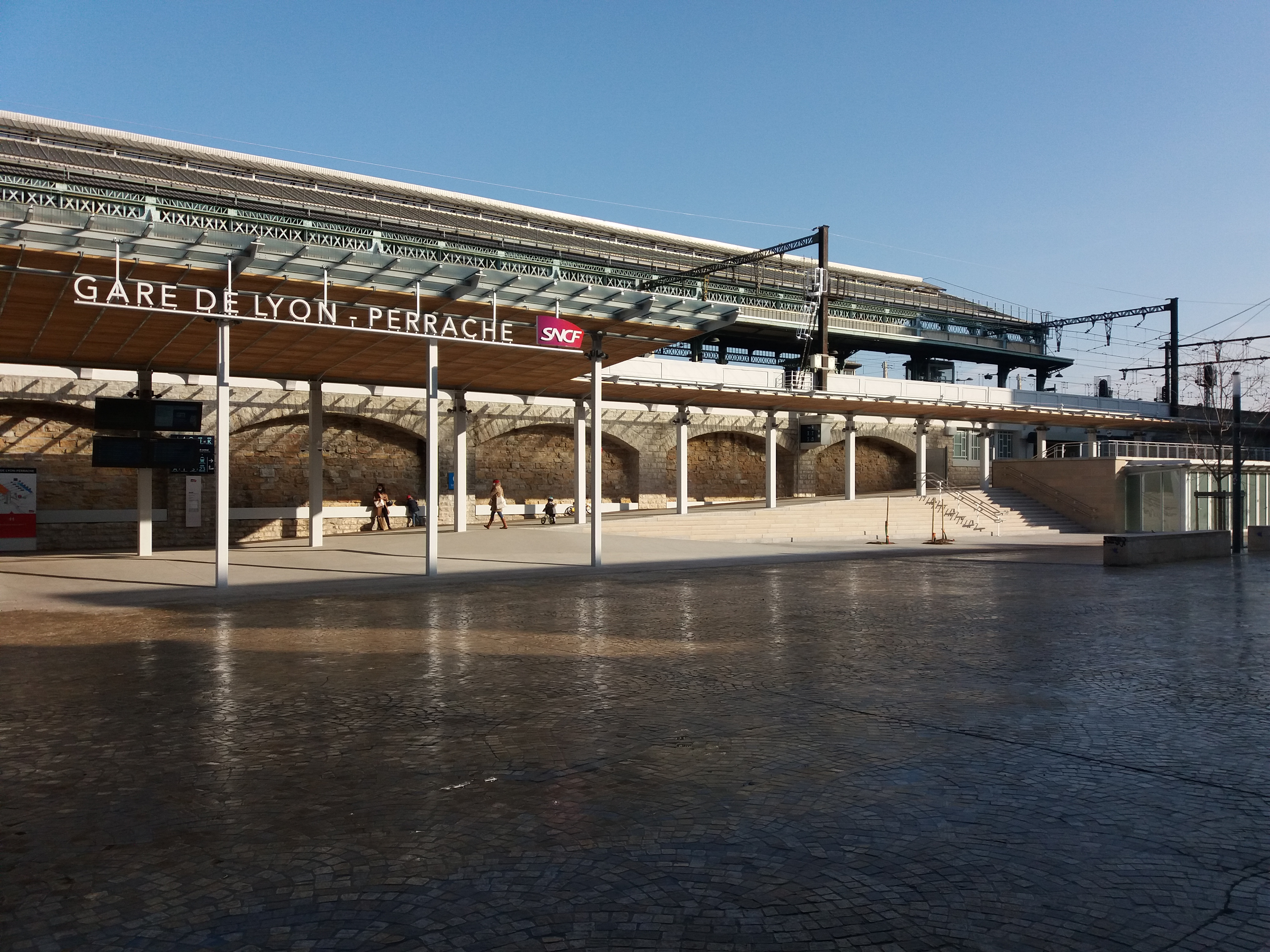
Lyon-Perrache station

Perrache (French pronunciation: [pɛʁaʃ]) is a quarter central to the 2nd arrondissement of Lyon, France, on the Presqu'île. It is best known for its Lyon-Perrache station.

== Location ==
Perrache is located to the south of Ainay, upstream of confluence between the Rhône and the Saône. It is named after Antoine-Michel Perrache, who began to develop the confluence and to expand it to the south. The filling and remediation works of the formerly marshy lands were made after a decision by Pierre-Marie Taillepied de Bondy, prefect of the Rhône from 1809 to 1814.

The multimodal station of Perrache shares the quarter into two parts which include train station, tram and metro.

The historical isolation of the southern area of the tracks is illustrated by the words "derrière les voûtes" ("behind the vaults") frequently used to designate this quarter. Neglected for a long time, the quarter is currently the subject of a major operation planning, like what happened at Gerland on the left river of the Rhône. The revaluation of the quarter is mainly concentrated around the project of the Musée des Confluences by Coop Himmelb(l)au.

== Transport ==
The quarter has two highways (A6 Lyon - Paris / A7 Lyon - Marseille), which will be replaced by the future A44.
