= Rapid transit track gauge =

Spacing of rails for metropolitan passenger transport

The vast majority of rapid transit systems use 1,435 mm (4 ft 8 1/2 in) standard gauge. Some of the largest and oldest subway systems in the world use standard gauge in agreement with the country-wide dominant usage for track gauge, e.g. London Underground (1863), Chicago "L" (1892), Vienna Metro (1898), Paris Métro (1900), Berlin U-Bahn (1902), New York City Subway (1904), Stockholm Metro (1950), Milan Metro (1964), Mexico City Metro (1969), Beijing Subway (1971), Seoul Metropolitan Subway (1974), Shanghai Metro (1993), Guangzhou Metro (1997), Shenzhen Metro (2004). Many rapid transit systems in countries where the main lines do not use standard gauges are built in standard gauge, including the Barcelona Metro, Santiago Metro, Taipei Metro, and many systems in India.

There are also systems that use 1,067 mm (3 ft 6 in) (some systems in Japan and the Jakarta MRT), 1,524 mm (5 ft) (the standard in former Soviet Union), 1,600 mm (5 ft 3 in) (the standard in Brazil) and few others.

Some systems use rubber tires, with some ones adding them to the normal steel wheels (e.g. Paris Metro, Mexico City Metro, Montreal Metro) and some others with only tires (e.g. Lille Metro, Sapporo Municipal Subway).

Some systems use monorail, the largest ones are in Chongqing Rail Transit and in São Paulo Metro.

For gauges used by systems that do not run in exclusive rights of way (trams, streetcars and light rail) see List of tram systems by gauge and electrification.

For references for the figures, see each system's page and List of metro systems.

Country	Network	Route length	Gauge	Comment
Algeria	Algiers Metro	18.5 km (11.5 mi)	1,435 mm (4 ft 8 1/2 in)	
Argentina	Buenos Aires Underground	56.7 km (35.2 mi)	1,435 mm (4 ft 8 1/2 in)	
Armenia	Yerevan Metro	13.4 km (8.3 mi)	1,524 mm (5 ft)	
Australia	Sydney Metro	36 km (22 mi)	1,435 mm (4 ft 8 1/2 in)	
Austria	Vienna U-Bahn	83.3 km (51.8 mi)	1,435 mm (4 ft 8 1/2 in)	
Azerbaijan	Baku Metro	40.7 km (25.3 mi)	1,524 mm (5 ft)	
Bangladesh	Dhaka Metro Rail	20.1 km (12.5 mi)	1,435 mm (4 ft 8 1/2 in)	
Belarus	Minsk Metro	40.8 km (25.4 mi)	1,524 mm (5 ft)	
Belgium	Brussels Metro	39.9 km (24.8 mi)	1,435 mm (4 ft 8 1/2 in)	
Brazil	Belo Horizonte Metro	28.1 km (17.5 mi)	1,600 mm (5 ft 3 in)	
Brazil	Federal District Metro	42.4 km (26.3 mi)	1,600 mm (5 ft 3 in)	
Brazil	Porto Alegre Metro	43.8 km (27.2 mi)	1,600 mm (5 ft 3 in)	
Brazil	Recife Metro	39.5 km (24.5 mi)	1,600 mm (5 ft 3 in)	Includes rapid transit lines only: Linha Centro (Center Line) and Linha Sul (South Line)
Brazil	Rio de Janeiro Metro	58 km (36 mi)	1,600 mm (5 ft 3 in)	
Brazil	Salvador Metro	34 km (21 mi)	1,435 mm (4 ft 8 1/2 in)	
Brazil	Fortaleza Metro	43.6 km (27.1 mi)	1,000 mm (3 ft 3 3/8 in)	
Brazil	São Paulo Metro	56.9 km (35.4 mi)	1,600 mm (5 ft 3 in)	Line 1, Line 2 and Line 3
Brazil	São Paulo Metro	31.4 km (19.5 mi)	1,435 mm (4 ft 8 1/2 in)	Line 4 and Line 5
Brazil	São Paulo Metro	20.5 km (12.7 mi)	Monorail	Line 15 and Line 17
Bulgaria	Sofia Metro	55 km (34 mi)	1,435 mm (4 ft 8 1/2 in)	
Canada	Montreal Metro	69.2 km (43.0 mi)	1,435 mm (4 ft 8 1/2 in) between guide bars and rubber tires	Michelin rubber-tyred metro system has both rubber tires and steel wheels
Canada	REM Montreal	64 km (40 mi)	1,435 mm (4 ft 8 1/2 in)	
Canada	Toronto subway	70.5 km (43.8 mi)	4 ft 10 7/8 in (1,495 mm)	Line 1, Line 2 and Line 4
Canada	SkyTrain	79.6 km (49.5 mi)	1,435 mm (4 ft 8 1/2 in)	Expo Line (SkyTrain), Millennium Line, and Canada Line
Chile	Santiago Metro	73.5 km (45.7 mi)	1,435 mm (4 ft 8 1/2 in)	Line 3, Line 4, Line 4A and Line 6
Chile	Santiago Metro	76 km (47 mi)	1,435 mm (4 ft 8 1/2 in) and rubber tires	Line 1, Line 2 and Line 5. Michelin rubber-tyred metro system has both rubber tires and steel wheels
China	Beijing Subway	838 km (521 mi)	1,435 mm (4 ft 8 1/2 in)	All lines except S1 line (Maglev), Yizhuang T1 line and Xijiao line (light rail)
China	Beijing Subway	10.2 km (6.3 mi)	Maglev	S1 line
China	Changchun Rail Transit	71.6 km (44.5 mi)	1,435 mm (4 ft 8 1/2 in)	Line 1, Line 2 and Line 6
China	Changsha Metro	228.5 km (142.0 mi)	1,435 mm (4 ft 8 1/2 in)	
China	Changzhou Metro	54.03 km (33.57 mi)	1,435 mm (4 ft 8 1/2 in)	
China	Chengdu Metro	620.71 km (385.69 mi)	1,435 mm (4 ft 8 1/2 in)	all lines except S3 line, a suburban line
China	Chongqing Rail Transit	457.72 km (284.41 mi)	1,435 mm (4 ft 8 1/2 in)	Loop line, Line 1, Line 4, Line 5, Line 6, Line 9, Line 10 and Jiangtiao line
China	Chongqing Rail Transit	98.5 km (61.2 mi)	Monorail	Line 2 and Line 3
China	Dalian Metro	237.7 km (147.7 mi)	1,435 mm (4 ft 8 1/2 in)	
China	Dongguan Rail Transit	95.2 km (59.2 mi)	1,435 mm (4 ft 8 1/2 in)	
China	Foshan Metro	134.9 km (83.8 mi)	1,435 mm (4 ft 8 1/2 in)	
China	Fuzhou Metro	143.5 km (89.2 mi)	1,435 mm (4 ft 8 1/2 in)	
China	Guangzhou Metro	697.74 km (433.56 mi)	1,435 mm (4 ft 8 1/2 in)	All lines except Zhujiang New Town APM
China	Guangzhou Metro	3.9 km (2.4 mi)	rubber tires	Zhujiang New Town APM
China	Guiyang Metro	149 km (93 mi)	1,435 mm (4 ft 8 1/2 in)	
China	Hangzhou Metro	516 km (321 mi)	1,435 mm (4 ft 8 1/2 in)	
China	Harbin Metro	91.6 km (56.9 mi)	1,435 mm (4 ft 8 1/2 in)	
China	Hefei Metro	232 km (144 mi)	1,435 mm (4 ft 8 1/2 in)	
China	Hohhot Metro	49 km (30 mi)	1,435 mm (4 ft 8 1/2 in)	
China	Jinan Metro	96.3 km (59.8 mi)	1,435 mm (4 ft 8 1/2 in)	
China	Jinhua Rail Transit	107 km (66 mi)	1,435 mm (4 ft 8 1/2 in)	
China	Kunming Rail Transit	164.3 km (102.1 mi)	1,435 mm (4 ft 8 1/2 in)	
China	Lanzhou Metro	34.96 km (21.72 mi)	1,435 mm (4 ft 8 1/2 in)	
China	Luoyang Subway	43.6 km (27.1 mi)	1,435 mm (4 ft 8 1/2 in)	
China	Nanchang Metro	128.6 km (79.9 mi)	1,435 mm (4 ft 8 1/2 in)	
China	Nanjing Metro	545 km (339 mi)	1,435 mm (4 ft 8 1/2 in)	
China	Nanning Rail Transit	127.9 km (79.5 mi)	1,435 mm (4 ft 8 1/2 in)	
China	Nantong Rail Transit	60 km (37 mi)	1,435 mm (4 ft 8 1/2 in)	
China	Ningbo Rail Transit	262 km (163 mi)	1,435 mm (4 ft 8 1/2 in)	
China	Qingdao Metro	346.3 km (215.2 mi)	1,435 mm (4 ft 8 1/2 in)	
China	Shanghai Metro	801.3 km (497.9 mi)	1,435 mm (4 ft 8 1/2 in)	All lines except Pujiang line. This figure excludes Maglev line and Jinshan Railway, both often included in Shanghai Metro maps but not considered part of the system.
China	Shanghai Metro	6.7 km (4.2 mi)	rubber tires	Pujiang line
China	Shaoxing Metro	61.9 km (38.5 mi)	1,435 mm (4 ft 8 1/2 in)	
China	Shenyang Metro	186.7 km (116.0 mi)	1,435 mm (4 ft 8 1/2 in)	
China	Shenzhen Metro	555.43 km (345.13 mi)	1,435 mm (4 ft 8 1/2 in)	
China	Shijiazhuang Metro	76.5 km (47.5 mi)	1,435 mm (4 ft 8 1/2 in)	
China	Suzhou Metro	345 km (214 mi)	1,435 mm (4 ft 8 1/2 in)	
China	Taiyuan Metro	52.4 km (32.6 mi)	1,435 mm (4 ft 8 1/2 in)	
China	Taizhou Rail Transit	52.4 km (32.6 mi)	1,435 mm (4 ft 8 1/2 in)	
China	Tianjin Metro	326.6 km (202.9 mi)	1,435 mm (4 ft 8 1/2 in)	
China	Ürümqi Metro	27.6 km (17.1 mi)	1,435 mm (4 ft 8 1/2 in)	
China	Wenzhou Rail Transit	116.4 km (72.3 mi)	1,435 mm (4 ft 8 1/2 in)	
China	Wuhan Metro	553 km (344 mi)	1,435 mm (4 ft 8 1/2 in)	
China	Wuhu Rail Transit	46.25 km (28.74 mi)	Monorail	
China	Wuxi Metro	145 km (90.1 mi)	1,435 mm (4 ft 8 1/2 in)	
China	Xiamen Metro	98.4 km (61.1 mi)	1,435 mm (4 ft 8 1/2 in)	
China	Xi'an Metro	427.9 km (265.9 mi)	1,435 mm (4 ft 8 1/2 in)	
China	Xuzhou Metro	72.5 km (45.0 mi)	1,435 mm (4 ft 8 1/2 in)	
China	Zhengzhou Metro	449.8 km (279.5 mi)	1,435 mm (4 ft 8 1/2 in)	
Hong Kong	Mass Transit Railway	102.1 km (63.4 mi)	1,435 mm (4 ft 8 1/2 in)	East Rail line, Tuen Ma line and South Island line
Hong Kong	Mass Transit Railway	79.4 km (49.3 mi)	1,432 mm (4 ft 8 3/8 in)	Kwun Tong line, Tsuen Wan line, Island line, Tung Chung line, Airport Express, Tseung Kwan O line, Disneyland Resort line
Macau	Macau Light Rapid Transit	16.3 km (10.1 mi)	rubber tires	
Colombia	Medellín Metro	31.3 km (19.4 mi)	1,435 mm (4 ft 8 1/2 in)	
Czech Republic	Prague Metro	65.2 km (40.5 mi)	1,435 mm (4 ft 8 1/2 in)	
Denmark	Copenhagen Metro	43.3 km (26.9 mi)	1,435 mm (4 ft 8 1/2 in)	
Dominican Republic	Santo Domingo Metro	30.9 km (19.2 mi)	1,435 mm (4 ft 8 1/2 in)	
Ecuador	Quito Metro	22 km (14 mi)	1,435 mm (4 ft 8 1/2 in)	
Egypt	Cairo Metro	107.1 km (66.5 mi)	1,435 mm (4 ft 8 1/2 in)	
Egypt	Cairo Light Rail Transit	70 km (43 mi)	1,435 mm (4 ft 8 1/2 in)	
Finland	Helsinki Metro	43 km (27 mi)	1,522 mm (4 ft 11 29/32 in)	
France	Lille Metro	45 km (28 mi)	rubber tires	VAL technology
France	Lyon Metro	2.5 km (1.6 mi)	1,435 mm (4 ft 8 1/2 in)	Line C rack railway
France	Lyon Metro	31.9 km (19.8 mi)	1,435 mm (4 ft 8 1/2 in) and rubber tires	Line A, Line B and Line D. Michelin rubber-tyred metro system has both rubber tires and steel wheels
France	Marseille Metro	21.9 km (13.6 mi)	1,435 mm (4 ft 8 1/2 in) and rubber tires	Michelin rubber-tyred metro system has both rubber tires and steel wheels
France	Paris Métro	161.9 km (100.6 mi)	1,435 mm (4 ft 8 1/2 in)	Line 2, Line 3, Line 5, Line 7, Line 8, Line 9, Line 10, Line 12 and Line 13
France	Paris Métro	83.7 km (52.0 mi)	1,435 mm (4 ft 8 1/2 in) and rubber tires	Line 1, Line 4, Line 6, Line 11 and Line 14. Michelin rubber-tyred metro system has both rubber tires and steel wheels
France	Rennes Metro	23 km (14 mi)	rubber tires	VAL technology
France	Toulouse Metro	28.2 km (17.5 mi)	rubber tires	VAL technology
Georgia	Tbilisi Metro	27.1 km (16.8 mi)	1,524 mm (5 ft)	
Germany	Berlin U-Bahn	156.1 km (97.0 mi)	1,435 mm (4 ft 8 1/2 in)	
Germany	Hamburg U-Bahn	106.1 km (65.9 mi)	1,435 mm (4 ft 8 1/2 in)	
Germany	Hanover Stadtbahn	121 km (75 mi)	1,435 mm (4 ft 8 1/2 in)	
Germany	Munich U-Bahn	95 km (59 mi)	1,435 mm (4 ft 8 1/2 in)	
Germany	Nuremberg U-Bahn	38.2 km (23.7 mi)	1,435 mm (4 ft 8 1/2 in)	
Greece	Athens Metro	91.7 km (57.0 mi)	1,435 mm (4 ft 8 1/2 in)	
Greece	Thessaloniki Metro	14.4 km (8.9 mi)	1,435 mm (4 ft 8 1/2 in)	
Hungary	Budapest Metro	38.2 km (23.7 mi)	1,435 mm (4 ft 8 1/2 in)	
India	Agra Metro	29.65 km (18.42 mi)	1,435 mm (4 ft 8 1/2 in)	
India	Ahmedabad Metro	60.1 km (37.3 mi)	1,435 mm (4 ft 8 1/2 in)	
India	Bhoj Metro	6.22 km (3.86 mi)	1,435 mm (4 ft 8 1/2 in)	
India	Chennai Metro	68.7 km (42.7 mi)	1,435 mm (4 ft 8 1/2 in)	
India	Delhi Metro	148.2 km (92.1 mi)	1,676 mm (5 ft 6 in)	Red Line, Yellow Line and Blue Line (1-4 lines)
India	Delhi Metro	226.3 km (140.6 mi)	1,435 mm (4 ft 8 1/2 in)	Green Line, Violet Line, Magenta Line, Pink Line, Grey Line (5-9 lines) and Airport Metro Express
India	Rapid Metro Gurgaon	11.7 km (7.3 mi)	1,435 mm (4 ft 8 1/2 in)	
India	Hyderabad Metro	67 km (42 mi)	1,435 mm (4 ft 8 1/2 in)	
India	Indore Metro	16.7 km (10.4 mi)	1,435 mm (4 ft 8 1/2 in)	
India	Jaipur Metro	12.1 km (7.5 mi)	1,435 mm (4 ft 8 1/2 in)	
India	Kanpur Metro	16 km (9.9 mi)	1,435 mm (4 ft 8 1/2 in)	
India	Kochi Metro	27.4 km (17.0 mi)	1,435 mm (4 ft 8 1/2 in)	
India	Kolkata Metro	45.5 km (28.3 mi)	1,676 mm (5 ft 6 in)	Blue Line, Purple Line and Orange Line
India	Kolkata Metro	14.1 km (8.8 mi)	1,435 mm (4 ft 8 1/2 in)	Green Line
India	Lucknow Metro	23 km (14 mi)	1,435 mm (4 ft 8 1/2 in)	
India	Mumbai Metro	90.48 km (56.22 mi)	1,435 mm (4 ft 8 1/2 in)	
India	Nagpur Metro	38.21 km (23.74 mi)	1,435 mm (4 ft 8 1/2 in)	
India	Namma Metro	103.6 km (64.4 mi)	1,435 mm (4 ft 8 1/2 in)	
India	Navi Mumbai Metro	11.1 km (6.9 mi)	1,435 mm (4 ft 8 1/2 in)	
India	Noida Metro	29.7 km (18.5 mi)	1,435 mm (4 ft 8 1/2 in)	
India	Patna Metro	4.3 km (2.7 mi)	1,435 mm (4 ft 8 1/2 in)	
India	Pune Metro	56.5 km (35.1 mi)	1,435 mm (4 ft 8 1/2 in)	
Indonesia	Jakarta MRT	15.7 km (9.8 mi)	1,067 mm (3 ft 6 in)	
Indonesia	Jakarta LRT	12.2 km (7.6 mi)	1,435 mm (4 ft 8 1/2 in)	
Indonesia	Jabodebek LRT	44.5 km (27.7 mi)	1,435 mm (4 ft 8 1/2 in)	
Indonesia	Palembang LRT	23.4 km (14.5 mi)	1,067 mm (3 ft 6 in)	
Iran	Isfahan Metro	16.2 km (10.1 mi)	1,435 mm (4 ft 8 1/2 in)	
Iran	Karaj metro	49.5 km (30.8 mi)	1,435 mm (4 ft 8 1/2 in)	
Iran	Mashhad Urban Railway	37.5 km (23.3 mi)	1,435 mm (4 ft 8 1/2 in)	
Iran	Shiraz Metro	32.5 km (20.2 mi)	1,435 mm (4 ft 8 1/2 in)	
Iran	Tabriz Metro	7 km (4.3 mi)	1,435 mm (4 ft 8 1/2 in)	
Iran	Tehran Metro	224.6 km (139.6 mi)	1,435 mm (4 ft 8 1/2 in)	All lines except Line 5
Italy	Brescia Metro	13.7 km (8.5 mi)	1,435 mm (4 ft 8 1/2 in)	
Italy	Catania Metro	10.5 km (6.5 mi)	1,435 mm (4 ft 8 1/2 in)	
Italy	Genoa Metro	7.1 km (4.4 mi)	1,435 mm (4 ft 8 1/2 in)	
Italy	Milan Metro	111.8 km (69.5 mi)	1,435 mm (4 ft 8 1/2 in)	
Italy	Naples Metro	34.5 km (21.4 mi)	1,435 mm (4 ft 8 1/2 in)	Line 1, Line 6, Line 11
Italy	Rome Metro	62.5 km (38.8 mi)	1,435 mm (4 ft 8 1/2 in)	
Italy	Turin Metro	15.1 km (9.4 mi)	rubber tires	VAL technology
Japan	Astram Line	18.4 km (11.4 mi)	rubber tires	
Japan	Fukuoka City Subway	17.8 km (11.1 mi)	1,067 mm (3 ft 6 in)	Airport Line and Hakozaki Line
Japan	Fukuoka City Subway	13.6 km (8.5 mi)	1,435 mm (4 ft 8 1/2 in)	Nanakuma Line
Japan	Kobe Municipal Subway	38.1 km (23.7 mi)	1,435 mm (4 ft 8 1/2 in)	
Japan	Kyoto Municipal Subway	31.2 km (19.4 mi)	1,435 mm (4 ft 8 1/2 in)	
Japan	Nagoya Municipal Subway	53.3 km (33.1 mi)	1,435 mm (4 ft 8 1/2 in)	Higashiyama Line, Meijō Line and Meikō Line
Japan	Nagoya Municipal Subway	40 km (25 mi)	1,067 mm (3 ft 6 in)	Tsurumai Line, Sakura-dōri Line and Kamiiida Line
Japan	Osaka Metro	133.1 km (82.7 mi)	1,435 mm (4 ft 8 1/2 in)	
Japan	Sapporo Municipal Subway	48.0 km (29.8 mi)	rubber tires	
Japan	Sendai Subway	14.8 km (9.2 mi)	1,067 mm (3 ft 6 in)	Namboku Line
Japan	Sendai Subway	13.9 km (8.6 mi)	1,435 mm (4 ft 8 1/2 in)	Tōzai Line
Japan	Toei Subway (Tokyo)	59 km (37 mi)	1,435 mm (4 ft 8 1/2 in)	Asakusa Line and Ōedo Line
Japan	Toei Subway (Tokyo)	26.5 km (16.5 mi)	1,067 mm (3 ft 6 in)	Mita Line
Japan	Toei Subway (Tokyo)	23.5 km (14.6 mi)	4 ft 6 in (1,372 mm)	Shinjuku Line
Japan	Tokyo Metro	41.7 km (25.9 mi)	1,435 mm (4 ft 8 1/2 in)	Ginza Line and Marunouchi Line
Japan	Tokyo Metro	153.4 km (95.3 mi)	1,067 mm (3 ft 6 in)	All lines except Ginza Line and Marunouchi Line
Japan	Tokyo Monorail	17.8 km (11.1 mi)	Monorail	
Japan	Rinkai Line (Tokyo)	12.2 km (7.6 mi)	1,067 mm (3 ft 6 in)	
Japan	Yokohama Municipal Subway	53.4 km (33.2 mi)	1,435 mm (4 ft 8 1/2 in)	
Japan	Minatomirai Line (Yokohama)	4.1 km (2.5 mi)	1,067 mm (3 ft 6 in)	
Kazakhstan	Almaty Metro	13.4 km (8.3 mi)	1,524 mm (5 ft)	
Kazakhstan	Astana Light Metro	22.4 km (13.9 mi)	1,435 mm (4 ft 8 1/2 in)	
North Korea	Pyongyang Metro	22.5 km (14.0 mi)	1,435 mm (4 ft 8 1/2 in)	
South Korea	Busan Metro	103.8 km (64.5 mi)	1,435 mm (4 ft 8 1/2 in)	Includes rapid transit lines only: lines 1-3
South Korea	Busan Metro	12.7 km (7.9 mi)	rubber tires	Line 4
South Korea	Daegu Metro	59.8 km (37.2 mi)	1,435 mm (4 ft 8 1/2 in)	Line 1 and Line 2 (Daegyeong Line not included)
South Korea	Daegu Metro	23.9 km (14.9 mi)	Monorail	Line 3
South Korea	Daejeon Metro	22.7 km (14.1 mi)	1,435 mm (4 ft 8 1/2 in)	
South Korea	Gimpo Goldline	23.7 km (14.7 mi)	1,435 mm (4 ft 8 1/2 in)	
South Korea	Gwangju Metro	20.1 km (12.5 mi)	1,435 mm (4 ft 8 1/2 in)	
South Korea	Incheon Subway	66.2 km (41.1 mi)	1,435 mm (4 ft 8 1/2 in)	
South Korea	Seoul Subway	367.5 km (228.4 mi)	1,435 mm (4 ft 8 1/2 in)	Lines 1-9
South Korea	Ui LRT	11.4 km (7.1 mi)	1,435 mm (4 ft 8 1/2 in)	
South Korea	Sillim Line	7.8 km (4.8 mi)	rubber tires	
South Korea	Korail metro lines	133 km (83 mi)	1,435 mm (4 ft 8 1/2 in)	Includes the Bundang Line, Korail portions of Seoul Subway Line 3 (Ilsan Line) and Seoul Subway Line 4 (Gwacheon Line and Ansan Line), and the Suin Line
South Korea	Shinbundang Line	33.4 km (20.8 mi)	1,435 mm (4 ft 8 1/2 in)	
South Korea	Uijeongbu U Line	11.2 km (7.0 mi)	rubber tires	VAL technology
Malaysia	Rapid KL	239.6 km (148.9 mi)	1,435 mm (4 ft 8 1/2 in)	All lines except KL Monorail
Malaysia	Rapid KL	8.6 km (5.3 mi)	Monorail	KL Monorail
Mexico	Guadalajara Metro	21 km (13 mi)	1,435 mm (4 ft 8 1/2 in)	Line 3
Mexico	Mexico City Metro	165.7 km (103.0 mi)	1,435 mm (4 ft 8 1/2 in) and rubber tires	All lines except Line 12 and Line A. Michelin rubber-tyred metro system has both rubber tires and steel wheels
Mexico	Mexico City Metro	35.2 km (21.9 mi)	1,435 mm (4 ft 8 1/2 in)	Line 12 and Line A
Mexico	Monterrey Metro	40 km (25 mi)	1,435 mm (4 ft 8 1/2 in)	For all 3 lines. The 5 train models (MM-90X, MM-93, MM-05, MM-20 and Duewag/Talbot MM-80) share the same rail gauge, and can be swapped to serve any of the 3 lines (they are all connected by 2 interchanges).
Netherlands	Amsterdam Metro	44.3 km (27.5 mi)	1,435 mm (4 ft 8 1/2 in)	
Netherlands	Rotterdam Metro	103.1 km (64.1 mi)	1,435 mm (4 ft 8 1/2 in)	Some sections of the Lines A and B have some level crossings (with priority) and so could therefore be considered "light rail" instead of "metro"
Nigeria	Abuja Light Rail	44.7 km (27.8 mi)	1,435 mm (4 ft 8 1/2 in)	
Nigeria	Lagos Rail Mass Transit	27 km (17 mi)	1,435 mm (4 ft 8 1/2 in)	Blue Line only (Red Line is a commuter rail)
Norway	Oslo Metro	86 km (53 mi)	1,435 mm (4 ft 8 1/2 in)	This system has similarities to light rail systems, because of existence of road level crossings, but is listed since there are almost entirely separated from roads
Pakistan	Lahore Metro	27.1 km (16.8 mi)	1,435 mm (4 ft 8 1/2 in)	
Panama	Panama Metro	39.8 km (24.7 mi)	1,435 mm (4 ft 8 1/2 in)	
Peru	Lima Metro	39.6 km (24.6 mi)	1,435 mm (4 ft 8 1/2 in)	
Philippines	Manila Light Rail Transit System	43.5 km (27.0 mi)	1,435 mm (4 ft 8 1/2 in)	
Philippines	Manila Metro Rail Transit System	16.9 km (10.5 mi)	1,435 mm (4 ft 8 1/2 in)	
Poland	Warsaw Metro	41.3 km (25.7 mi)	1,435 mm (4 ft 8 1/2 in)	
Portugal	Lisbon Metro	44.2 km (27.5 mi)	1,435 mm (4 ft 8 1/2 in)	
Qatar	Doha Metro	76 km (47 mi)	1,435 mm (4 ft 8 1/2 in)	
Romania	Bucharest Metro	80.1 km (49.8 mi)	1,432 mm (4 ft 8 3/8 in)	Gauge is nominally 1432, but the tolerances (+10, -3) are centered around Standard gauge
Russia	Kazan Metro	16.8 km (10.4 mi)	1,524 mm (5 ft)	
Russia	Moscow Metro	488.2 km (303.4 mi)	1,524 mm (5 ft)	All lines except Moscow Central Diameters, Moscow Central Circle (a conventional railway numbered as Line 14)
Russia	Nizhny Novgorod Metro	21.6 km (13.4 mi)	1,524 mm (5 ft)	
Russia	Novosibirsk Metro	15.9 km (9.9 mi)	1,524 mm (5 ft)	
Russia	Saint Petersburg Metro	131 km (81 mi)	1,524 mm (5 ft)	
Russia	Samara Metro	11.6 km (7.2 mi)	1,524 mm (5 ft)	
Russia	Yekaterinburg Metro	12.7 km (7.9 mi)	1,524 mm (5 ft)	
Saudi Arabia	Riyadh Metro	176 km (109 mi)	1,435 mm (4 ft 8 1/2 in)	
Saudi Arabia	Mecca Metro	18.1 km (11.2 mi)	1,435 mm (4 ft 8 1/2 in)	Al Mashaaer Al Mugaddassah Metro Southern Line (Line S)
Singapore	Light Rail Transit	28.6 km (17.8 mi)	rubber tires	
Singapore	Mass Rapid Transit	246.6 km (153.2 mi)	1,435 mm (4 ft 8 1/2 in)	
Spain	Barcelona Metro	20.7 km (12.9 mi)	1,672 mm (5 ft 5 13/16 in)	Line 1
Spain	Barcelona Metro	119.2 km (74.1 mi)	1,435 mm (4 ft 8 1/2 in)	All lines except Line 1 and Line 8
Spain	Barcelona Metro	11.3 km (7.0 mi)	1,000 mm (3 ft 3 3/8 in)	Line 8
Spain	Bilbao Metro	45.1 km (28.0 mi)	1,000 mm (3 ft 3 3/8 in)	
Spain	Madrid Metro	296.6 km (184.3 mi)	1,445 mm (4 ft 8 7/8 in)	Including lines 1-12 and Ramal. Not including the three Light Rail lines
Spain	Palma Metro	8.6 km (5.3 mi)	1,000 mm (3 ft 3 3/8 in)	Only line 1
Sweden	Stockholm Metro	105.7 km (65.7 mi)	1,435 mm (4 ft 8 1/2 in)	
Switzerland	Lausanne Metro	5.9 km (3.7 mi)	1,435 mm (4 ft 8 1/2 in) and rubber tires	Only Line M2 (Michelin rubber-tyred metro system has both rubber tires and steel wheels). Line M1 is light rail
Taiwan	Kaohsiung Metro	59.8 km (37.2 mi)	1,435 mm (4 ft 8 1/2 in)	Red line and Orange line
Taiwan	Taipei Metro	127.8 km (79.4 mi)	1,435 mm (4 ft 8 1/2 in)	All lines except Wenhu line
Taiwan	Taipei Metro	25.1 km (15.6 mi)	rubber tires	Wenhu line. VAL technology
Taiwan	Taichung MRT	16.7 km (10.4 mi)	1,435 mm (4 ft 8 1/2 in)	
Taiwan	Taoyuan Metro	53.1 km (33.0 mi)	1,435 mm (4 ft 8 1/2 in)	
Thailand	BTS Skytrain(Bangkok)	68.2 km (42.4 mi)	1,435 mm (4 ft 8 1/2 in)	
Thailand	MRT (Bangkok)	70.6 km (43.9 mi)	1,435 mm (4 ft 8 1/2 in)	Blue Line and Purple Line
Thailand	MRT (Bangkok)	64.9 km (40.3 mi)	Monorail	Yellow Line and Pink Line
Turkey	Adana Metro	13.5 km (8.4 mi)	1,435 mm (4 ft 8 1/2 in)	
Turkey	Ankara Metro	67.4 km (41.9 mi)	1,435 mm (4 ft 8 1/2 in)	
Turkey	Bursaray	39 km (24 mi)	1,435 mm (4 ft 8 1/2 in)	
Turkey	Istanbul Metro	265.16 km (164.76 mi)	1,435 mm (4 ft 8 1/2 in)	M1-M11 lines
Turkey	İzmir Metro	27 km (17 mi)	1,435 mm (4 ft 8 1/2 in)	
Ukraine	Dnipro Metro	7.1 km (4.4 mi)	1,524 mm (5 ft)	
Ukraine	Kharkiv Metro	38.1 km (23.7 mi)	1,524 mm (5 ft)	
Ukraine	Kyiv Metro	67.6 km (42.0 mi)	1,524 mm (5 ft)	
United Arab Emirates	Dubai Metro	89.6 km (55.7 mi)	1,435 mm (4 ft 8 1/2 in)	
United Kingdom	Glasgow Subway	10.4 km (6.5 mi)	4 ft (1,219 mm)	
United Kingdom	London Underground	405.2 km (251.8 mi)	1,435 mm (4 ft 8 1/2 in)	
United Kingdom	Docklands Light Railway	38 km (24 mi)	1,435 mm (4 ft 8 1/2 in)	
United Kingdom	Tyne and Wear Metro	77.5 km (48.2 mi)	1,435 mm (4 ft 8 1/2 in)	
United States	MARTA (Atlanta)	76.6 km (47.6 mi)	1,435 mm (4 ft 8 1/2 in)	
United States	Baltimore Metro Subway	24.9 km (15.5 mi)	1,435 mm (4 ft 8 1/2 in)	
United States	MBTA subway (Boston)	63.9 km (39.7 mi)	1,435 mm (4 ft 8 1/2 in)	Red Line, Orange Line and Blue Line
United States	Chicago "L"	165.4 km (102.8 mi)	1,435 mm (4 ft 8 1/2 in)	
United States	RTA Rapid Transit: Red Line (Cleveland)	31 km (19 mi)	1,435 mm (4 ft 8 1/2 in)	
United States	Honolulu Skyline	17.4 km (10.8 mi)	1,435 mm (4 ft 8 1/2 in)	
United States	Los Angeles Metro Rail	28.0 km (17.4 mi)	1,435 mm (4 ft 8 1/2 in)	B Line and D Line
United States	Metrorail (Miami)	39.3 km (24.4 mi)	1,435 mm (4 ft 8 1/2 in)	
United States	New York City Subway	380.2 km (236.2 mi)	1,435 mm (4 ft 8 1/2 in)	
United States	Staten Island Railway	22.5 km (14.0 mi)	1,435 mm (4 ft 8 1/2 in)	
United States	PATH	22.2 km (13.8 mi)	1,435 mm (4 ft 8 1/2 in)	
United States	SEPTA (Philadelphia)	48.1 km (29.9 mi)	1,435 mm (4 ft 8 1/2 in)	Broad Street Line and Norristown High Speed Line (latter one a combination of a rapid transit, a commuter rail and a light rail systems)
United States	SEPTA (Philadelphia)	20.8 km (12.9 mi)	5 ft 2 1/2 in (1,588 mm)	Market–Frankford Line
United States	PATCO Speedline	22.9 km (14.2 mi)	1,435 mm (4 ft 8 1/2 in)	
United States	BART (San Francisco)	186.8 km (116.1 mi)	1,676 mm (5 ft 6 in)	
United States	Washington Metro	208 km (129 mi)	4 ft 8 1/4 in (1,429 mm)	
Puerto Rico	Tren Urbano	17.2 km (10.7 mi)	1,435 mm (4 ft 8 1/2 in)	
Uzbekistan	Tashkent Metro	66.7 km (41.4 mi)	1,524 mm (5 ft)	
Venezuela	Caracas Metro	63.6 km (39.5 mi)	1,435 mm (4 ft 8 1/2 in)	Include Los Teques Metro
Vietnam	Hanoi Metro	25.6 km (15.9 mi)	1,435 mm (4 ft 8 1/2 in)	
Vietnam	Ho Chi Minh City Metro	19.7 km (12.2 mi)	1,435 mm (4 ft 8 1/2 in)	

== See also ==
- List of metro systems
- List of track gauges
- List of tram systems by gauge and electrification
- Track gauge
