= MPL 16 =

French train type

- MPL 16 train at Charpennes - Charles Hernu
- In service: 25 June 2022−present
- Manufacturer: Alstom
- Family name: Metropolis
- Replaced: MPL 75
- Constructed: 2016−present
- Number built: 72 trainsets (all in service)
- Formation: 2-4 cars per trainset
- Operator: TCL
- Depots: La Poudrette (Line B); Thioley (Line D)
- Lines served: (future)

Specifications
- Car body construction: Stainless Steel
- Train length: 2-car set: 32 m (105 ft 0 in); 4-car set: 72 m (236 ft 3 in)
- Car length: 16 m (52 ft 6 in)
- Width: 2.89 m (9.5 ft)
- Doors: 3 per side, per car
- Maximum speed: Design: 90 km/h (56 mph); Service: 80 km/h (50 mph)
- Traction system: Alstom OniX 572 HP2-AM IGBT-VVVF
- Traction motors: Alstom 6ELA (squirrel-cage induction)
- Acceleration: 4.86 km/(h⋅s) (3.02 mph/s) max.
- Deceleration: 5 km/(h⋅s) (3.1 mph/s) (emergency brake)
- HVAC: Air conditioning
- Electric systems: Guide bar, 750 V DC
- Current collection: Contact shoes, side running on the vertical face of the guide bars
- UIC classification: 2-car set: B'B' + B'B'; 4-car set: (B'B' + B'B')+(B'B' + B'B')
- Bogies: Type CL449
- Braking systems: Electrodynamic, regenerative, disc
- Safety systems: Alstom Urbalis 400 moving block CBTC ATC under ATO GoA 4 (UTO), with subsystems of ATP, Iconis ATS and Smartlock CBI
- Coupling system: Dellner type
- Track gauge: 1,435 mm (4 ft 8 1/2 in) standard gauge, with running pads for the rubber tired wheels outside of the steel rails

The MPL16 is an automated rubber-tyred metro train designed by Alstom for the Lyon Metro.
