= List of Lyon Metro stations =

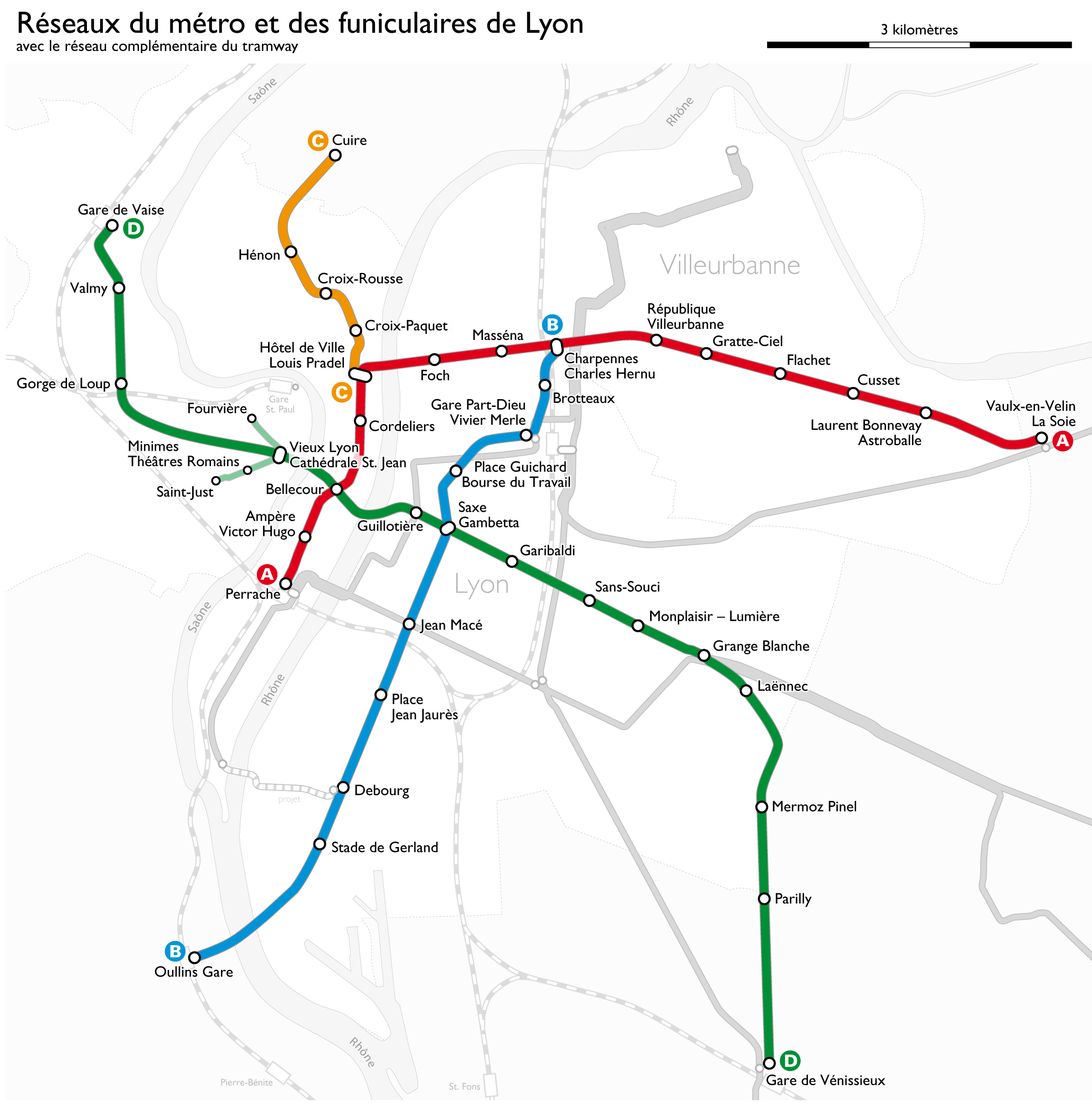
Map of the Lyon Metro network.

The following is a list of Lyon Metro stations. As of October 2023, there are 42 stations (46 stations, counting interchange stations twice) in the Lyon Metro system proper. This list includes the metro stations, as well as the stations of the two funiculars of Lyon.

== Metro ==
All metro stations are wheelchair accessible, and are equipped with turnstiles or automated gates.(Except the line's C station "Croix-Paquet")

=== Line A ===
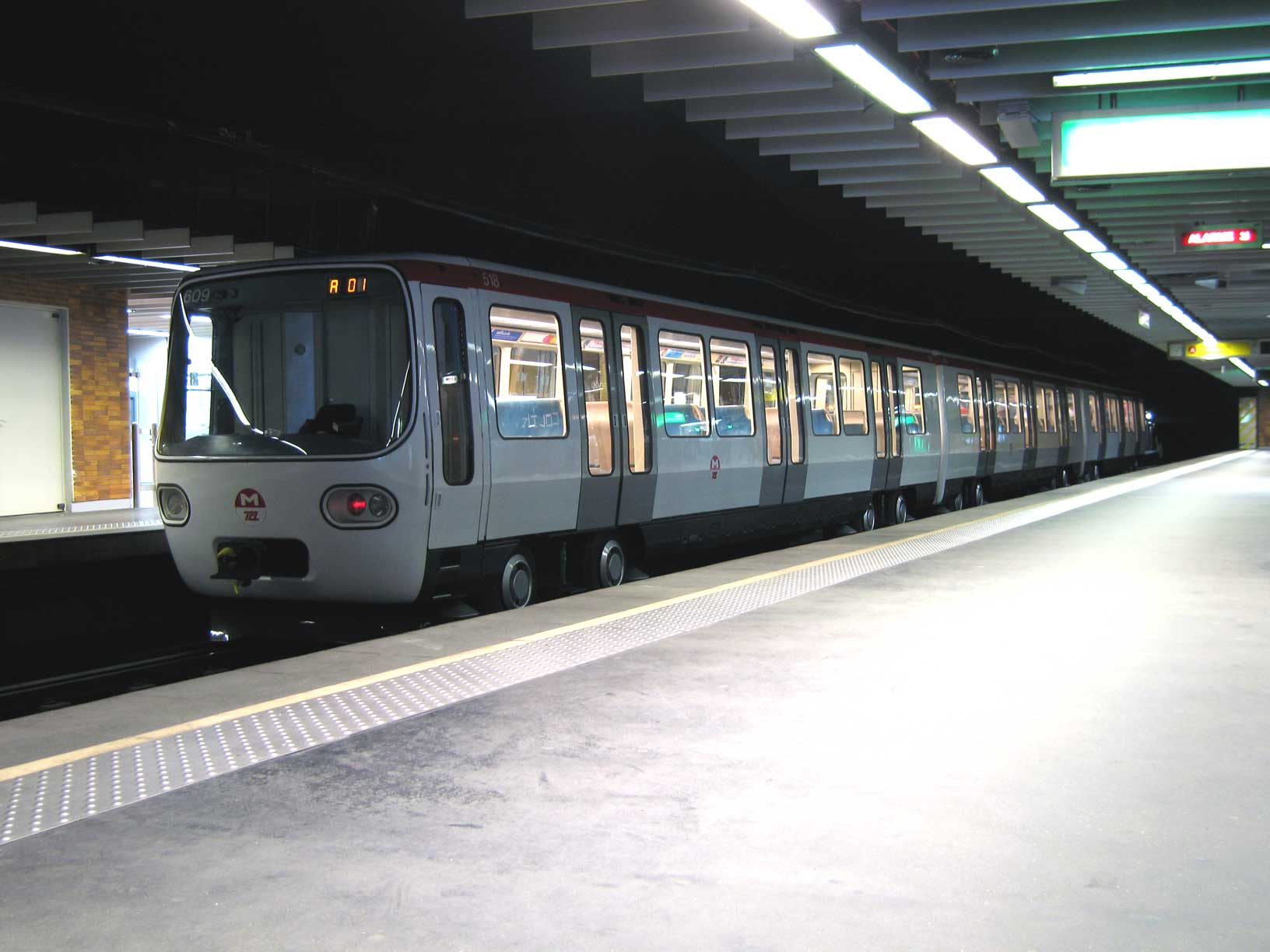
Perrache train station

Line A of the Lyon Metro currently serves 14 stations, and has a route length of 9.2 kilometres (5.7 mi). It, together with Line B, were the inaugural lines of the Lyon Metro, opening in 1978. An extension of Line A from Laurent Bonnevay–Astroballe to Vaulx-en-Velin–La Soie opened in 2007.

- Perrache
- Ampère–Victor Hugo
- Bellecour
- Cordeliers
- Hôtel de Ville–Louis Pradel
- Foch
- Masséna
- Charpennes–Charles Hernu
- République–Villeurbanne
- Gratte-Ciel
- Flachet–Alain Gilles
- Cusset
- Laurent Bonnevay–Astroballe
- Vaulx-en-Velin–La Soie

=== Line B ===
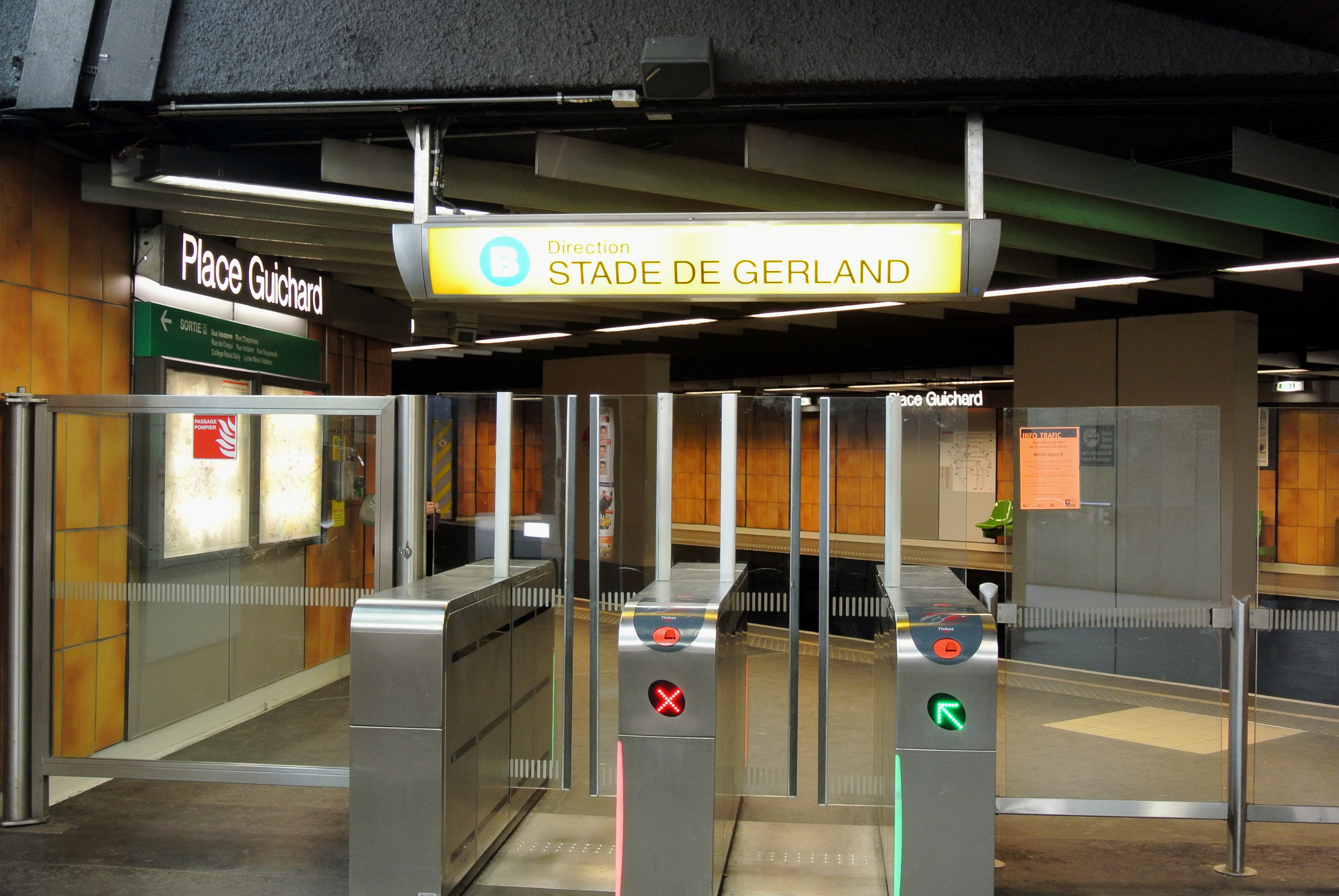
Place Guichard

Line B of the Lyon Metro currently serves 12 stations, and has a route length of 10.1 kilometres (6.3 mi). It, together with Line A, were the inaugural lines of the Lyon Metro, opening in 1978. It has since been extended southwards twice: from Part-Dieu to Jean Macé in 1981, and again from Jean Macé to Stade de Gerland in 2000; a further extension to the train station at Oullins Gare opened in December 2013.Then a new extension opened in October 2023 featuring 2 new station:Oullins Centre and Saint-Genis-Laval Hôpital Lyon Sud.

- Charpennes–Charles Hernu
- Brotteaux
- Gare Part-Dieu–Vivier Merle (connections at Gare Part-Dieu–Villette with walking distance:)
- Place Guichard–Bourse du Travail (connection at Palais de Justice–Mairie du 3ème with walking distance:)
- Saxe–Gambetta
- Jean Macé
- Place Jean Jaurès
- Debourg
- Stade de Gerland–Le LOU
- Gare d'Oullins
- Oullins Centre
- Saint-Genis-Laval–Hôpital Lyon Sud

=== Line C ===
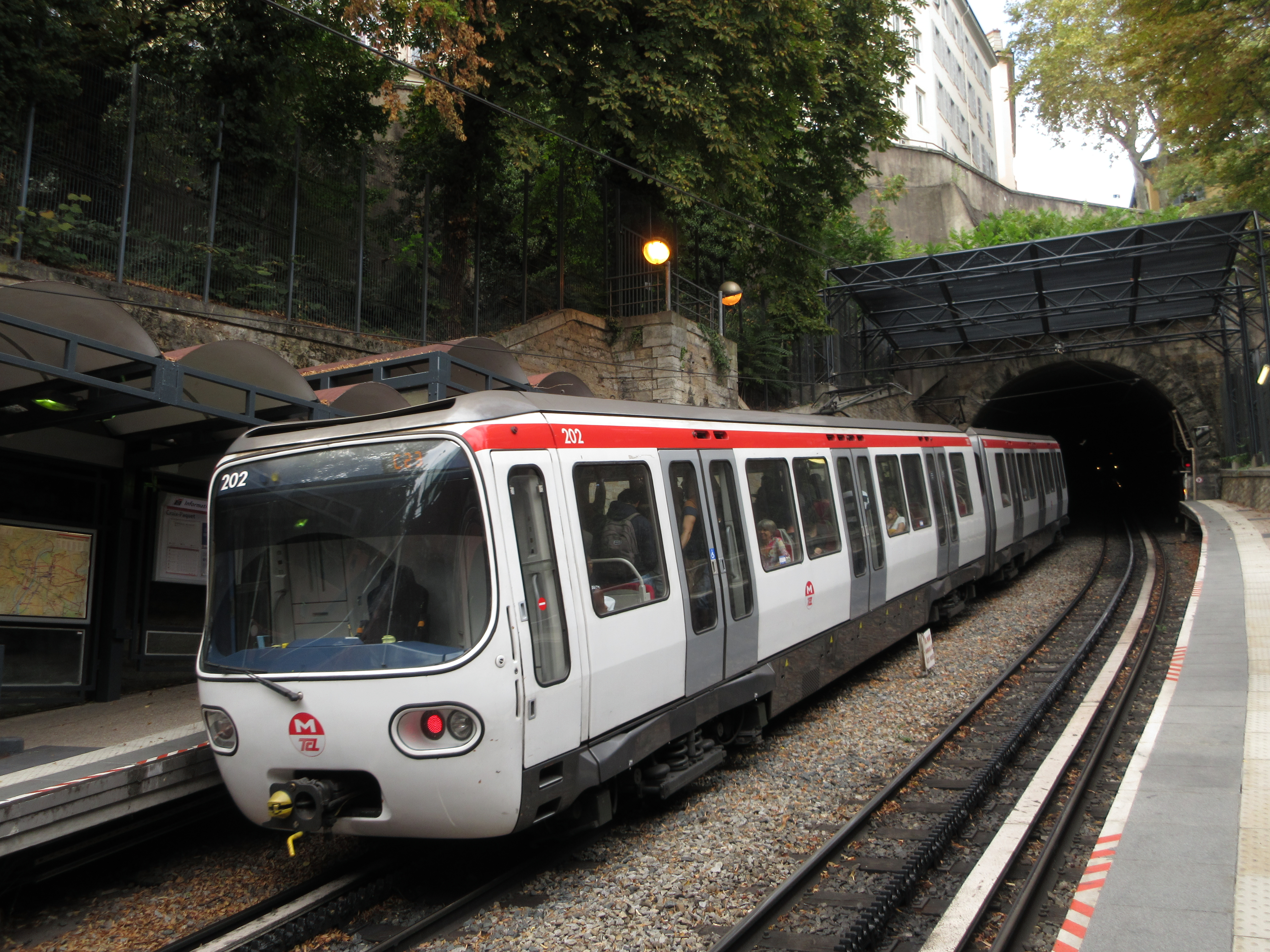
Croix-Paquet

Line C of the Lyon Metro serves 5 stations, and has a route length of 2.5 kilometres (1.6 mi). It began to operate in 1974, independently of the Lyon Metro, as a rack railway, after the conversion from a former funicular. When it was integrated into the Lyon Metro with the latter's inauguration in 1978, Line C was extended from Croix-Paquet to Hôtel de Ville; in 1984 the line reached its current northern terminus at Cuire.

- Hôtel de Ville–Louis Pradel
- Croix-Paquet
- Croix-Rousse
- Hénon
- Cuire

=== Line D ===
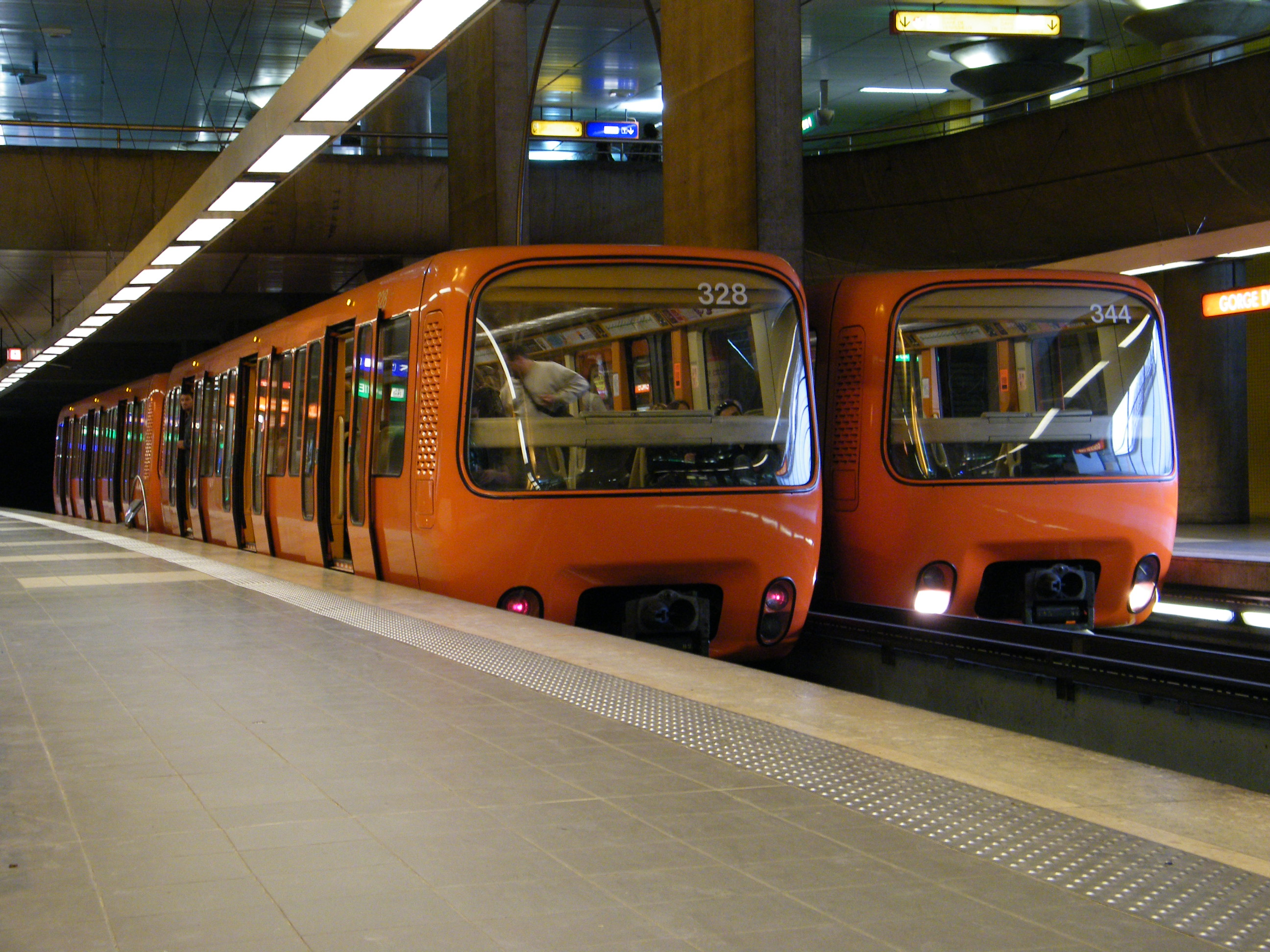
Gorge de Loup

Line D of the Lyon Metro is the longest line, serving 15 stations, and having a route length of 12.6 kilometres (7.8 mi). It is the newest line of the Lyon Metro, first opening in 1991. Line D has been extended twice since its opening: in 1992 from Grange Blanche to Gare de Vénissieux, and in 1997 from Gorge de Loup to Gare de Vaise.

- Gare de Vaise
- Valmy
- Gorge de Loup (Western Lyon tram-train)
- Vieux Lyon–Cathédrale Saint-Jean
- Bellecour
- Guillotière–Gabriel Péri
- Saxe–Gambetta
- Garibaldi
- Sans Souci
- Monplaisir–Lumière
- Grange Blanche
- Laënnec
- Mermoz–Pinel
- Parilly
- Gare de Vénissieux

== Funiculars ==
=== Funicular F1 (Saint-Just) ===
- Vieux Lyon–Cathédrale Saint-Jean
- Minimes–Théâtres Romains
- Saint-Just

=== Funicular F2 (Fourvière) ===
- Vieux Lyon–Cathédrale Saint-Jean
- Fourvière

== See also ==
- Vélo'v
- Lyon Metro
- Lyon tramway
- Funiculars of Lyon
