= MPL 85 =

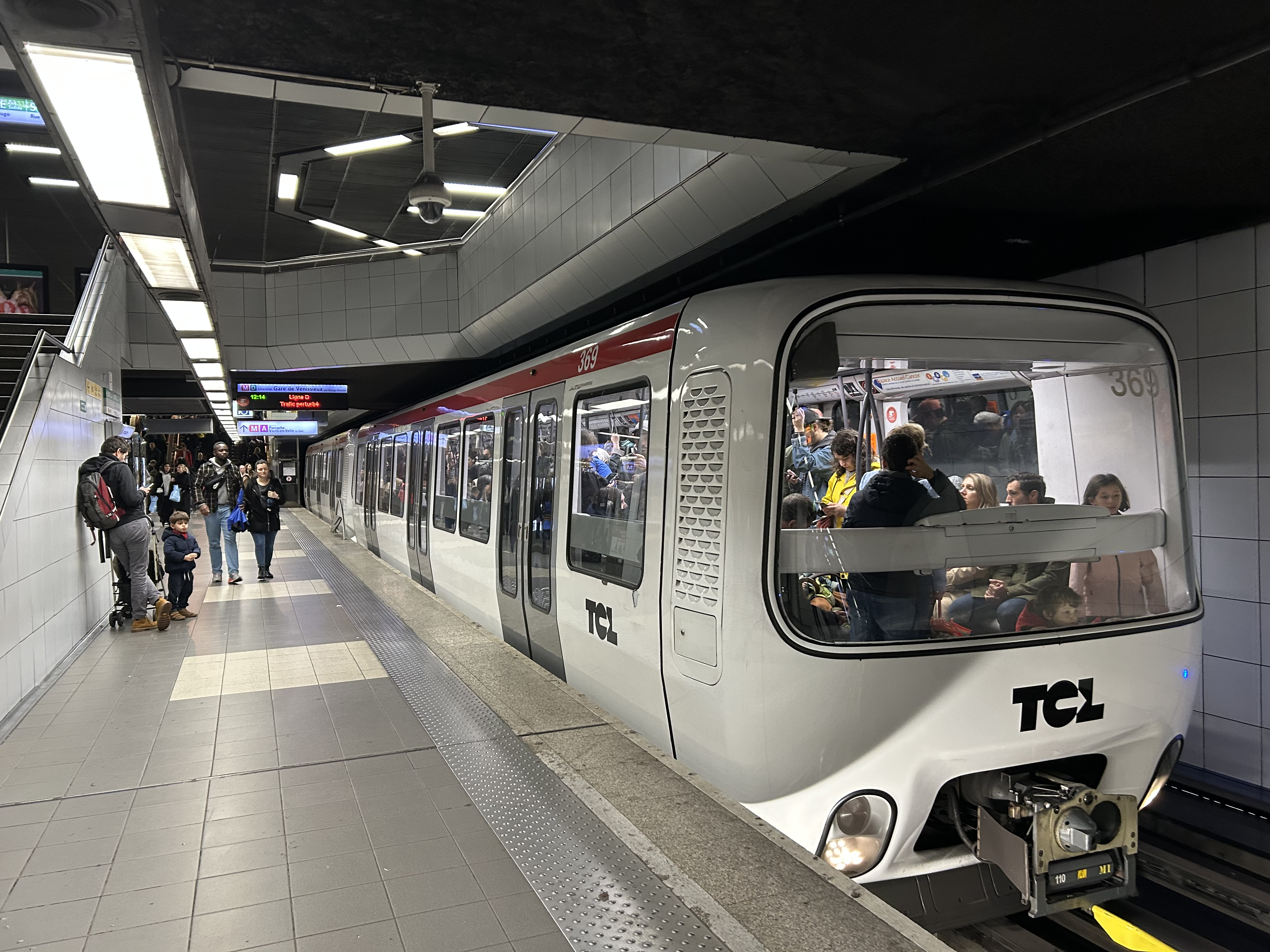
- In service: 1991-Present
- Manufacturer: Alstom
- Constructed: 1985-1988
- Entered service: 1991–1992
- Refurbished: 2017-2018
- Number built: 36
- Number in service: 36
- Formation: 2 cars per trainset
- Capacity: 325 (100 seated) per trainset
- Operators: Lyon Metro
- Lines served: D

Specifications
- Train length: 36.17 m (118 ft 8 in)
- Car length: 18.085 m (59 ft 4 in)
- Width: 2.89 m (9 ft 5 3/4 in)
- Height: 3.45 m (11 ft 3 7/8 in)
- Maximum speed: 75 km/h (47 mph)
- Electric system(s): 750 V DC guide bars
- Current collection: Contact shoe
- Track gauge: 1,435 mm (4 ft 8 1/2 in) with roll ways along the track

The MPL 85 (Métro Pneus Lyon 1985) is the driverless rubber-tyred electric train type used on the Lyon Metro's Line D. The entire fleet was built by Alstom (then Alsthom). The trains were delivered in 1988, but only entered service in 1991 (when Line D was opened). The accelerating and deaccelerating sounds of the MPL-85 units are quite similar to the MP 05 stock of the Paris Métro and to the NS-2004 stock of the Santiago Metro, although they look completely different.
