= Lyon Metro Line B =

Metro line in Lyon, France

Line B

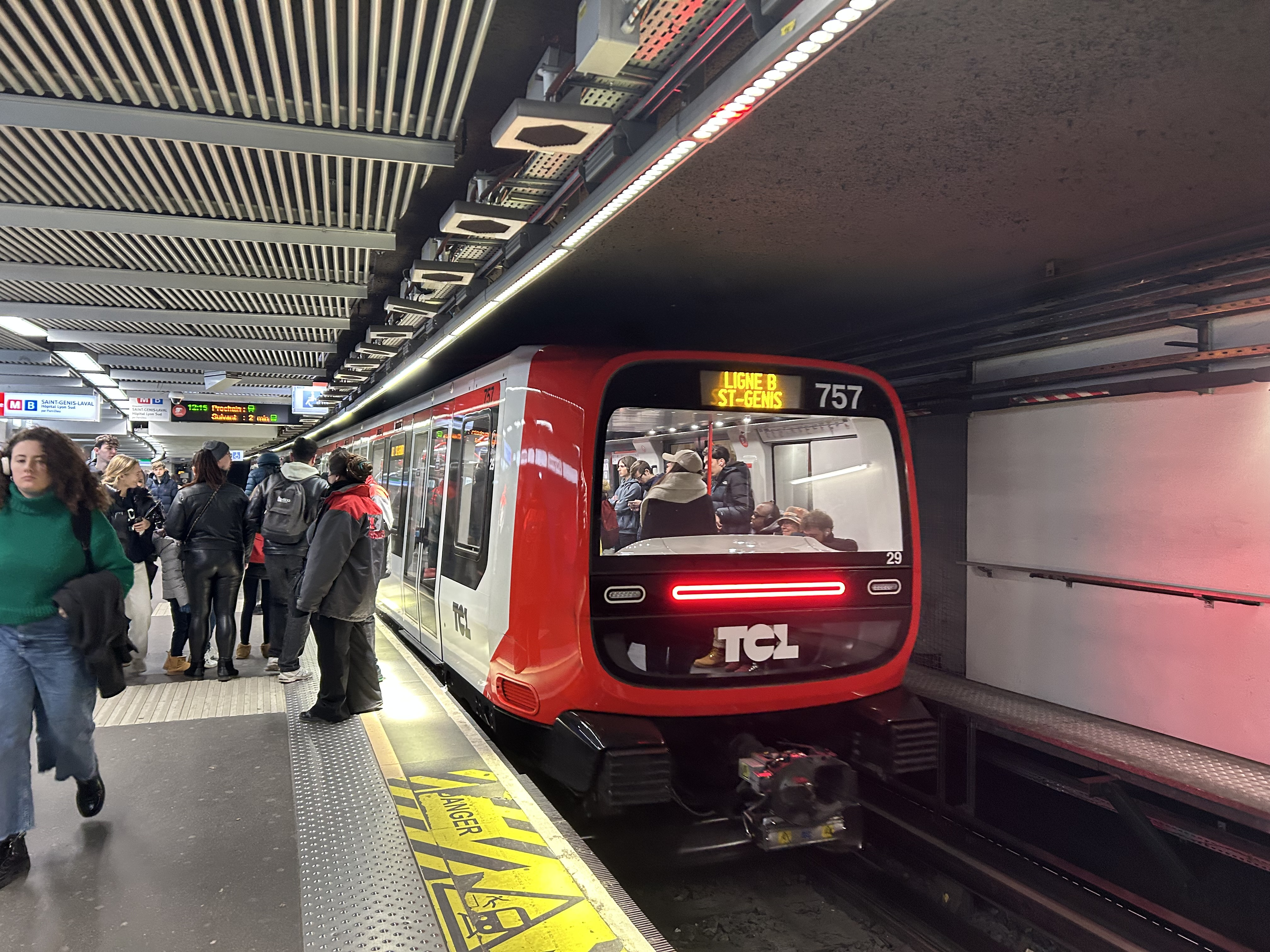

Overview
- Native name: Ligne B
- Line number: B
- Termini: Charpennes–Charles Hernu; Saint-Genis-Laval–Hôpital Lyon Sud
- Connecting lines: Lyon Metro Lyon Metro Line A Lyon Metro Line D Lyon tramway Lyon tramway#Line T1 Lyon tramway#Line T2 Lyon tramway#Line T3 Lyon tramway#Line T4 Lyon tramway#Line T6
- Stations: 12

Service
- Type: Rapid transit
- System: Lyon Metro
- Operator: TCL
- Rolling stock: MPL 16
- Ridership: Annual: 50,683,000 (2019)

History
- Opened: 2 May 1978
- Last extension: 20 October 2023

Technical
- Line length: 10.2 km (6.3 mi)
- Character: Driverless
- Rack system: None
- Track gauge: 1,435 mm (4 ft 8 1/2 in) standard gauge with rollways along track
- Electrification: 750 V DC guide bars
- Average inter-station distance: 625 m (2,051 ft)

Line B (Ligne B) is a line on the Lyon Metro in France that runs between Charpennes–Charles Hernu and Saint-Genis-Laval–Hôpital Lyon Sud. It was constructed using the cut-and-cover method, and went into service on 2 May 1978. Together with Line A, it was one of the inaugural lines of the Lyon Metro. It has since been extended three times: from Part-Dieu to Jean Macé in 1981, from Jean Macé to Stade de Gerland in 2000, from Stade de Gerland to Oullins railway station in 2013 and to Saint-Genis-Laval–Hôpital Lyon Sud in 2023. The line serves 12 stations, and is 10.2 kilometres (6.3 mi) long. Line B trains run on tires rather than steel wheels; it is a rubber-tired metro line.

== List of the stations ==

- Charpennes–Charles Hernu
- Brotteaux
- Gare Part-Dieu–Vivier Merle (connections at Gare Part-Dieu–Villette with walking distance:)
- Place Guichard–Bourse du Travail (connection at Palais de Justice–Mairie du 3ème with walking distance:)
- Saxe–Gambetta
- Jean Macé
- Place Jean Jaurès
- Debourg
- Stade de Gerland–Le LOU
- Gare d'Oullins
- Oullins Centre
- Saint-Genis-Laval–Hôpital Lyon Sud

== Chronology ==
- 2 May 1978: Charpennes – Part-Dieu
- 14 September 1981: Part-Dieu – Jean Macé
- 4 September 2000: Jean Macé – Stade de Gerland
- 11 December 2013: Stade de Gerland – Gare d'Oullins
- 20 October 2023: Gare d'Oullins – Saint-Genis-Laval–Hôpital Lyon Sud

== Extensions ==
Line B was extended a few kilometres southbound from Stade de Gerland to Oullins railway station. A tunnel had to be built under the Rhône River. This extension opened on 11 December 2013 at 2 pm (11/12/13, 14:00).

On 20 October 2023, Line B was extended from Gare d'Oullins to Saint-Genis-Laval–Hôpital Lyon Sud. This extension is 2.5 kilometres long and has two new stations: The first is "Oullins Centre" (city center of Oullins) and the second is "Saint-Genis-Laval–Hôpital Lyon Sud" (Lyon South Hospital in Saint-Genis-Laval).

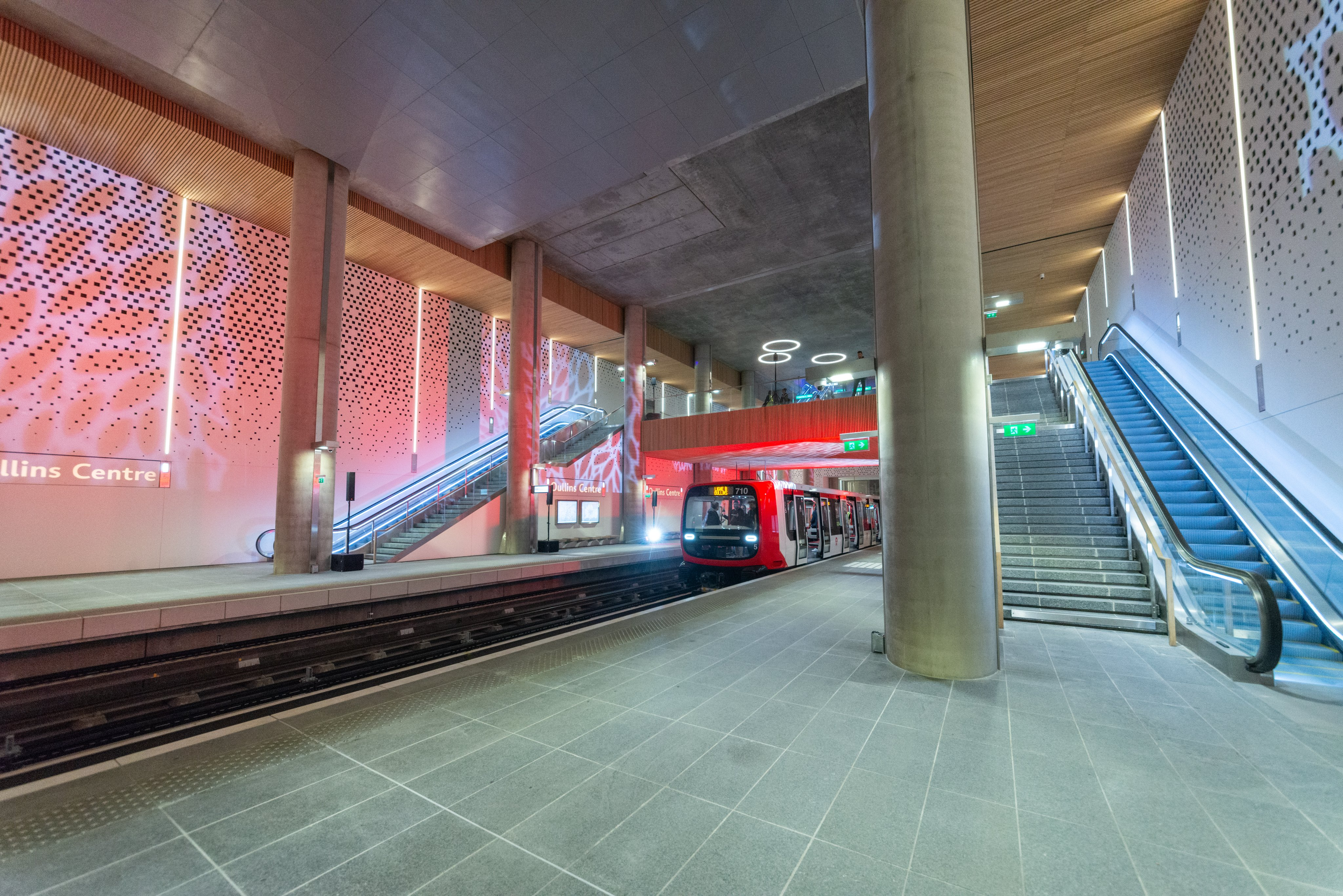
Oullins Centre station

Since June 2022, line B runs with a new driverless system, and new MPL 16 trains circulate on it. This new rolling stock has been ordered to Alstom in 2016. The current MPL 75 trains will join the others MPL 75 of line A to increase the capacity.
