= Lyon Metro Line A =

Metro line in Lyon, France

Line A

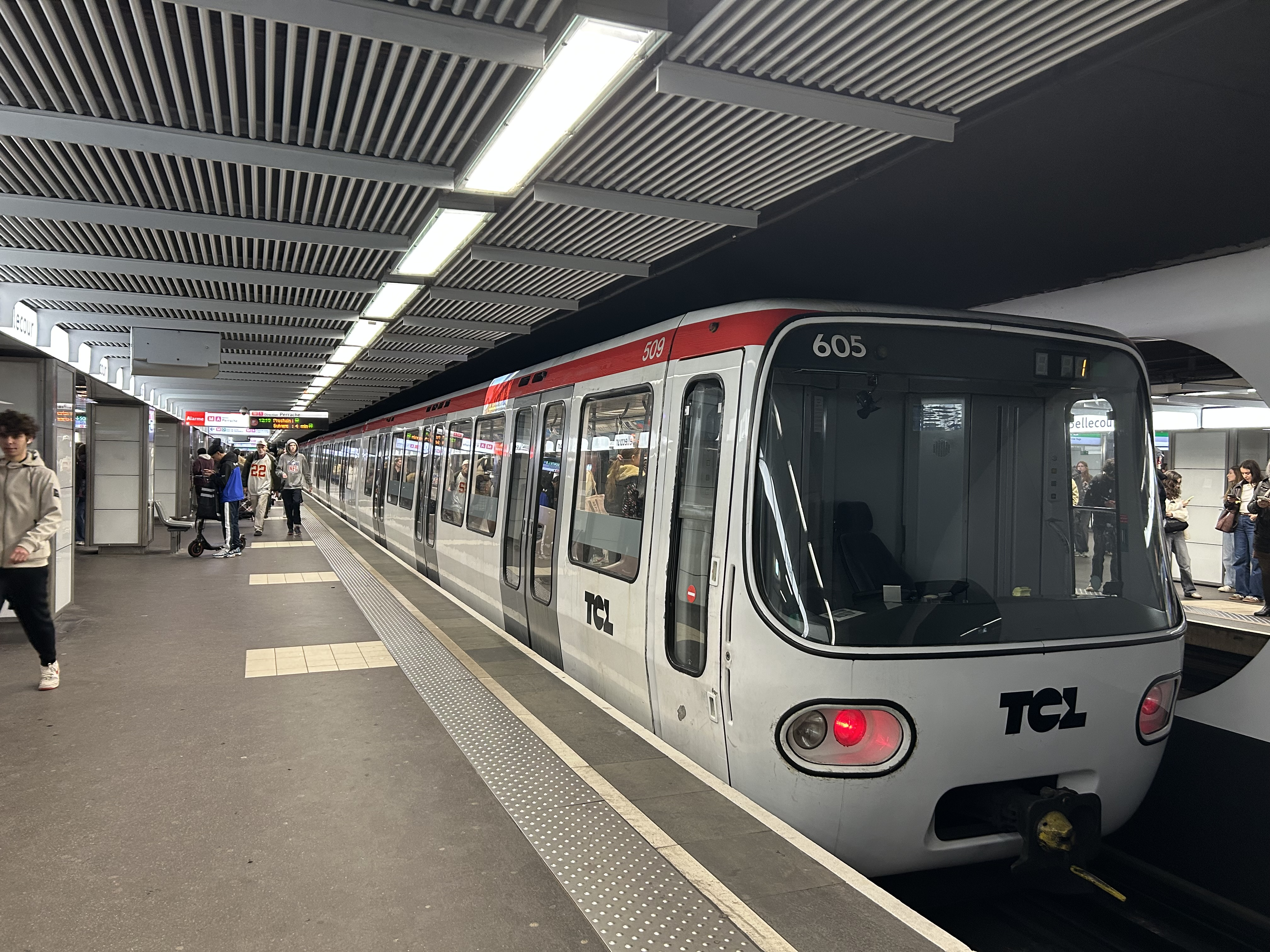

Overview
- Native name: Ligne A
- Termini: Perrache; Vaulx-en-Velin–La Soie
- Connecting lines: Lyon Metro Lyon Metro Line B Lyon Metro Line C Lyon Metro Line D Lyon tramway Lyon tramway#Line T1 Lyon tramway#Line T2 Lyon tramway#Line T3 Lyon tramway#Line T4 Lyon tramway#Line T7
- Stations: 14

Service
- Type: Rapid transit
- System: Lyon Metro
- Operator: TCL
- Rolling stock: MPL 75
- Ridership: Annual: 74,424,000 (2019)

History
- Opened: 2 May 1978
- Last extension: 2 October 2007

Technical
- Line length: 9.2 km (5.7 mi)
- Rack system: None
- Track gauge: 1,435 mm (4 ft 8 1/2 in) standard gauge with rollways along track
- Electrification: 750 V DC guide bars
- Average inter-station distance: 790 m (2,590 ft)

Line A (Ligne A) is a line on the Lyon Metro that runs between Perrache and Vaulx-en-Velin–La Soie. It was constructed using the cut-and-cover method, and went into service on 2 May 1978. It, together with Line B, were the inaugural lines of the Lyon Metro. An extension of Line A from Laurent Bonnevay–Astroballe to Vaulx-en-Velin–La Soie opened in 2007. The line currently serves 14 stations, and is 9.2 kilometres (5.7 mi) long. Line A trains run on tires rather than steel wheels; it is a rubber-tired metro line.

== List of the stations ==
- Perrache
- Ampère–Victor Hugo
- Bellecour
- Cordeliers
- Hôtel de Ville–Louis Pradel
- Foch
- Masséna
- Charpennes–Charles Hernu
- République–Villeurbanne
- Gratte-Ciel
- Flachet–Alain Gilles
- Cusset
- Laurent Bonnevay–Astroballe
- Vaulx-en-Velin–La Soie

Plan schématique de la ligne

== Chronology ==
- 2 May 1978: Perrache – Laurent Bonnevay
- 2 October 2007: Laurent Bonnevay – Vaulx-en-Velin–La Soie

== Extension ==
Line A was extended 1 kilometre (0.62 mi) eastwards from Laurent Bonnevay–Astroballe to Vaulx-en-Velin–La Soie (1 station) to provide connection with the new express tram line to Lyon–Saint-Exupéry Airport, called Rhônexpress as well as tram line T3. This extension opened on 2 October 2007 and cost €53 million.
