= MPL 75 =

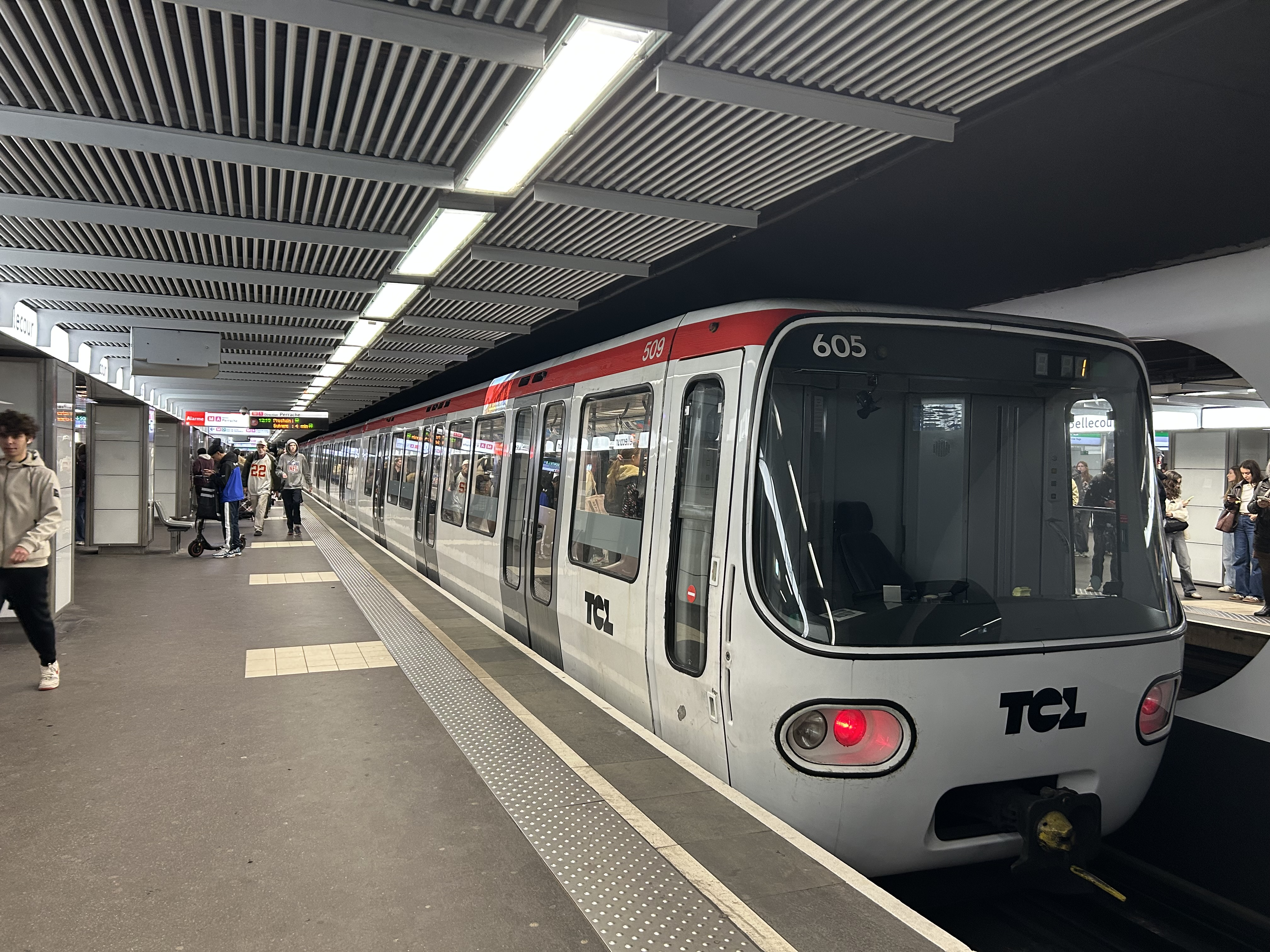
- In service: 1978–present
- Manufacturer: Alstom
- Constructed: 1974–1981
- Entered service: 1978
- Number built: 32
- Capacity: 144 (from 1997-2011), 114 seated (2011-now); maximum 608
- Operators: Lyon Metro
- Lines served: A

Specifications
- Train length: 54.37 m (178 ft 4 1/2 in)
- Width: 2.89 m (9 ft 5 3/4 in)
- Height: 3.4 m (11 ft 1 7/8 in)
- Maximum speed: 90 km/h (56 mph)
- Electric system(s): 750 V DC guide bars
- Current collection: Contact shoe
- Track gauge: 1,435 mm (4 ft 8 1/2 in) with rollways along track

The MPL 75 (Métro Pneus Lyon 1975) is a rubber-tyred EMU used on Line A of the Lyon Metro, as well as formerly Line B. The entire fleet was built by Alstom (then Alsthom) and was delivered in two batches in 1978 and 1981.
