= Lyon Metro =

Rapid transit system in Lyon, France

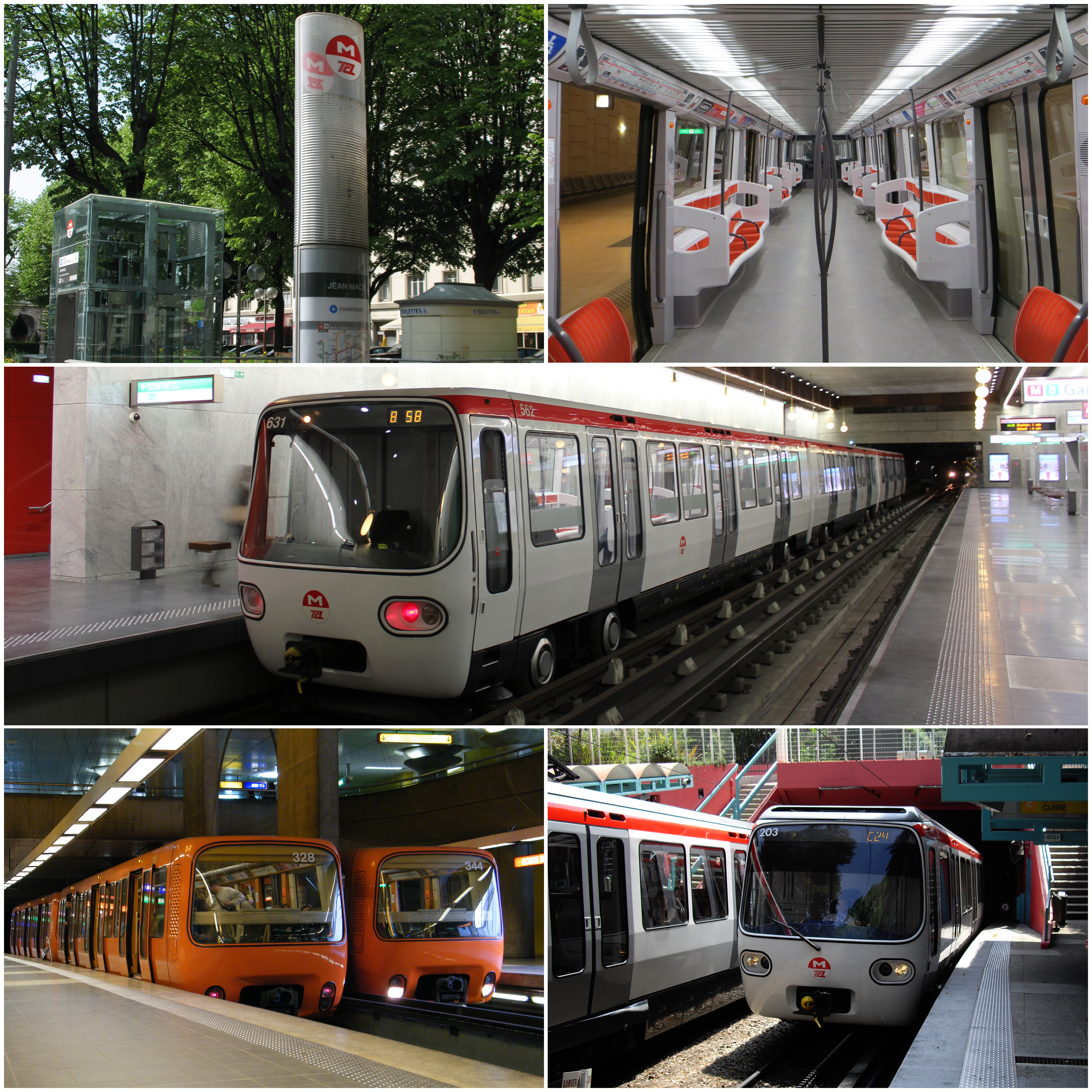

Overview
- Native name: Métro de Lyon
- Owner: SYTRAL Mobilités (in French)
- Locale: Lyon Metropolis, France
- Transit type: Rapid transit
- Number of lines: 4
- Number of stations: 42
- Daily ridership: 810,000 (2025)
- Annual ridership: 219,000,000 (2019)

Operation
- Began operation: 9 December 1974; 51 years ago
- Operator: TCL
- Number of vehicles: 73

Technical
- System length: 34.4 km (21.4 mi)
- Track gauge: 1,435 mm (4 ft 8 1/2 in) standard gauge with roll ways along the rails
- Electrification: 750 V DC guide bars
System map

The Lyon Metro (French: Métro de Lyon, [metʁo d(ə) ljɔ̃]) is a rapid transit system serving Lyon Metropolis, France. First opened in 1974, it currently consists of four lines, serving 42 stations and comprising 34.4 kilometres (21.4 mi) of route. Part of the Transports en Commun Lyonnais (TCL) system of public transport, it is supported by two funiculars and a tramway network.

Unlike other French metro systems, but like RER and other SNCF services, Lyon Metro trains run on the left. This is the result of an unrealised project to run the metro into the suburbs on existing railway lines. The loading gauge for all lines is 2.90 m (9 ft 6.2 in), more generous than the average for metros in Europe. The Lyon Metro has rubber-wheel cars.

In 2025, the daily average ridership on the metro was 810,000.

== Routes ==
The Lyon Metro consists of four lines, A, B, C and D, each identified on maps by its own colour:

Line	Opened	Length	Stations	Termini	Rolling stock
Lyon Metro Line A	1978	9.2 km (5.7 mi)	14	Perrache (railway station); Vaulx-en-Velin–La Soie	MPL 75
Lyon Metro Line B	1978	10.1 km (6.3 mi)	12	Charpennes–Charles Hernu; Saint-Genis-Laval–Hôpital Lyon Sud	MPL 16
Lyon Metro Line C	1974	2.5 km (1.6 mi)	5	Hôtel de Ville–Louis Pradel; Cuire	MCL 80
Lyon Metro Line D	1991	12.6 km (7.8 mi)	15	Gare de Vaise (railway station); Gare de Vénissieux (railway station)	MPL 85

=== Lines A and B ===
Line A from Perrache to Laurent Bonnevay–Astroballe and Line B from Charpennes to Part-Dieu were constructed by cut-and-cover and went into service on 2 May 1978, as the inaugural lines of the Lyon Metro. Trains on both lines run on rubber tyres rather than steel wheels.

Line B was extended to Jean Macé on 9 September 1981, to Stade de Gerland on 4 September 2000 as well as later to Gare d'Oullins on 11 December 2013.

An extension to Vaulx-en-Velin–La Soie on Line A opened in October 2007.

Since 2022, Line B is automated with new MPL 16 rolling stock ordered to Alstom in 2016. The MPL 75 trains previously used on Line B are meant to join the other MPL 75s on Line A to increase capacity.

An extension to Line B saw two stations, Oullins Centre and Saint-Genis-Laval–Hôpital Lyon Sud open on 20 October 2023.

=== Line C ===
The Croix-Rousse-Croix-Paquet rack railway, which was refurbished in 1974, was integrated into the Metro in 1978 as Line C, with an extension to Hôtel de Ville–Louis Pradel (thus running from Hôtel de Ville–Louis Pradel to Croix-Rousse). It was extended to Cuire on 8 December 1984.

The line was constructed using various methods; the incline rising through a deep tunnel, the portion on the flat at Croix-Rousse using cut-and-cover while the section beyond Hénon runs on the surface. The Croix Paquet station claims to be the steepest metro station in Europe, with an incline of 17%.

Line C uses overhead wires and steel wheels while Lines A, B and D use a third rail and rubber tyres. Until Paris Métro Line 15 opens it is the only metro line in France to use overhead lines and the only steel wheeled metro line in France outside Paris.

=== Line D ===
Line D, the first fully automatic metro line in France, started with operators on board trains on 4 September 1991, between Gorge de Loup and Grange Blanche. The line was extended to Gare de Vénissieux on 11 December 1992, when it switched to driverless operation. On 28 April 1997, it was extended again to Gare de Vaise.

Using rubber tyres like lines A and B, trains on line D are controlled by a system known as MAGGALY (Métro Automatique à Grand Gabarit de l’Agglomération Lyonnaise). Unusually for a driverless metro, no platform screen doors are installed on station platforms. The trains use infrared sensors to detect obstructions on the track. Other systems using a similar technology include the Nuremberg U-Bahn (U2 & U3) and Budapest Metro's Line 4.

The deepest line in Lyon, Line D was constructed partly using boring machines and passes under both rivers, the Rhône and Saône. At 12.5 kilometres (7.8 mi) long with 15 stations, it is also the longest line in Lyon.

In 2016, new MPL 16 rolling stock was ordered from Alstom for Line B and Line D; it came into service on Line B in 2022. These trains allow for an increase in capacity on Line D. Further, they will be coupled to form four-car units at rush hours and should replace the MPL 75 of Line B which would then solely run on Line A.

== Operation ==
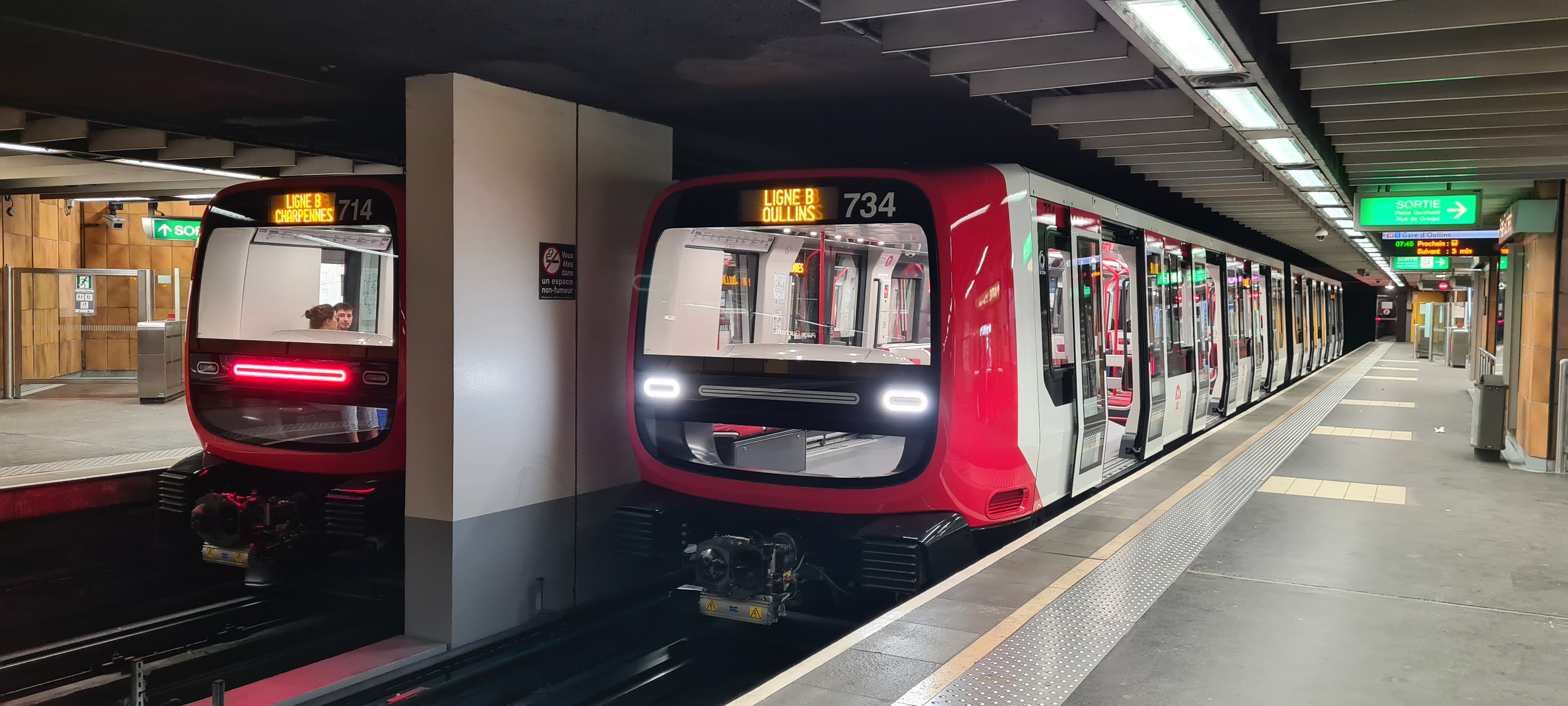
Automatic trains on the Lyon Metro Line B

The Metro, like the rest of the local public transport system, is operated by Keolis Lyon (ex-SLTC - the Société lyonnaise de transports en commun (Lyon public transport company)), under the TCL brand - Transports en commun lyonnais (Lyon public transport). It is operated on behalf of SYTRAL Mobilités - the Syndicat mixte des transports pour le Rhône et l'agglomération lyonnaise (Rhône department and Lyon metropolitan transport syndicate), a Syndicat Mixte. On 1 January 2025 RATP Dev will take over operation of the metro.

== Future expansion ==
A new line, dubbed Line E, was under consideration to link Lyon's western suburbs to the city centre. Twelve variants were initially proposed; two options, running from either Bellecour or Hôtel de Ville to Alaï, were selected for further study and could potentially have been opened around 2030. In 2022, however, the plans for Line E and other metro extensions have been cancelled in favor of plans for new express tramways, partly underground.

== See also ==
- List of Lyon Metro stations
- List of metro systems
