= Funiculars of Lyon =

Two railways in Lyon, France

The Funiculars of Lyon (Funiculaires de Lyon) is a network of funicular railways in Lyon, France. Of the five lines once in existence, only the two routes on the Fourvière hill remain in operation, with the rest of the network now either closed, converted to road vehicle use, or integrated within the Lyon underground system.

== History ==
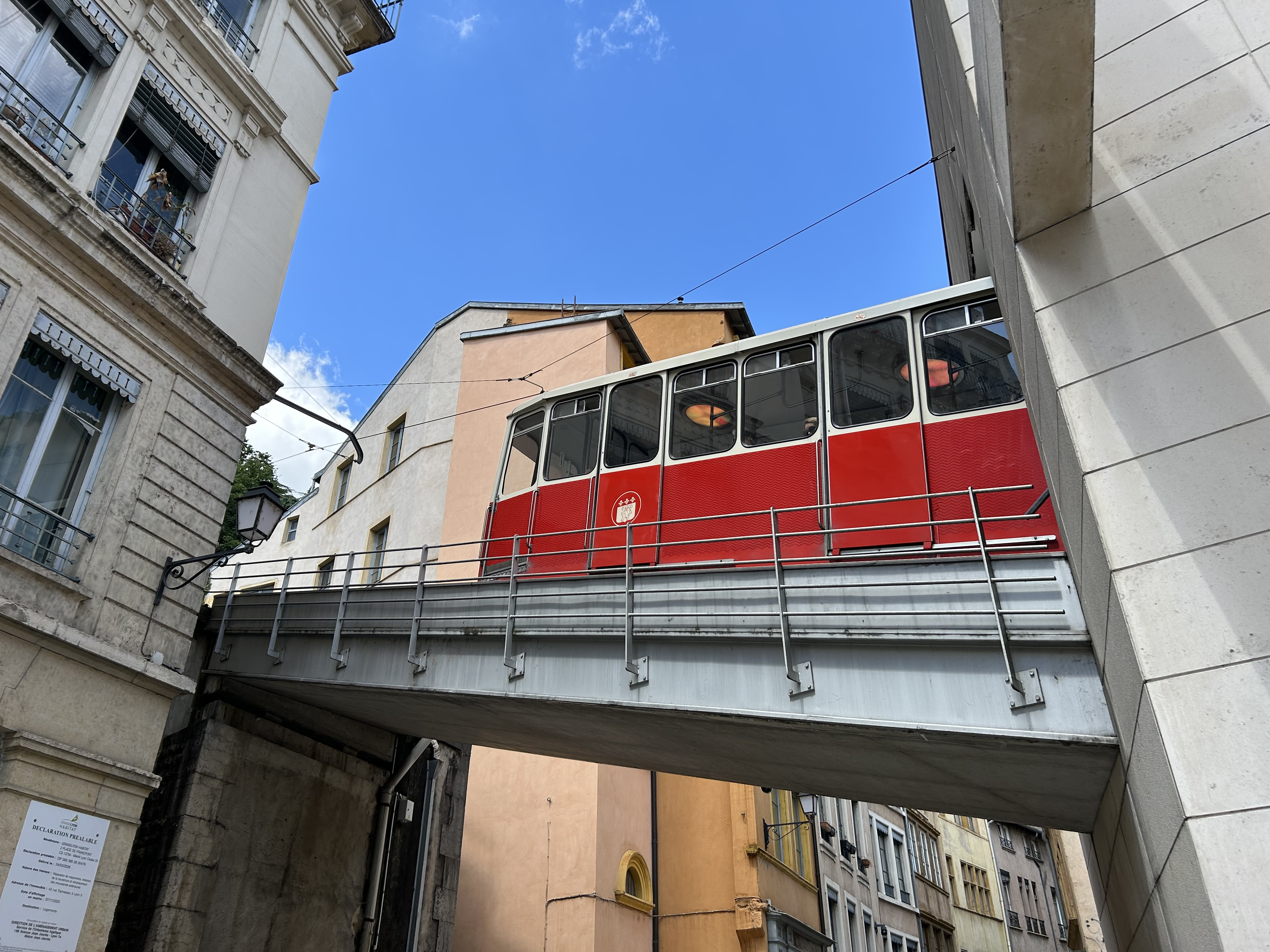
A funicular of Lyon entering Saint Jean station in 2026.

No fewer than five funicular lines, nicknamed ficelles ("threads") were built.

- The first line opened in 1862 and linked Rue Terme and Boulevard de la Croix-Rousse. The funicular was closed and converted to a road tunnel in 1968.
- The second line opened in 1891 and served the Butte de la Croix Rousse. The line was converted into a rack railway in 1972 and rebuilt and extended at both ends to become Line C of the Lyon Metro in 1978.
- The third line opened in 1878 linking Saint-Jean to Saint-Just with an intermediate station at Minimes, climbing the Fourvière hill. The line was converted to a rack railway in 1901 and back to a funicular in 1958.
- The fourth and fifth lines were opened in 1900, linking the Tour Metallique on Fourvière hill to Saint-Paul and the Basilica on Fourvière with Saint-Jean. The first was closed in 1937 and the second was modernised in 1970 with a change of gauge from 1,000 mm (3 ft 3 3/8 in) to 1,300 mm (4 ft 3 3/16 in). The Fourvière - Saint-Jean line is 431 metres (1,414 ft) long with a 30% incline.

Both lines still in service were modernised again in 1986 and 1987. The Fourvière funicular was refurbished at the start of 2018, and the St Just funicular at the start of 2019. A new station at Saint-Jean was built in 1991 to serve the new line of the Metro and both funicular lines, and the whole complex named Vieux-Lyon.

According to the definition of a rapid transit system given by French dictionaries – "electric traction railway, partially or totally underground, serving a large urban area" – Lyon can claim to have one of the world's first rapid transit lines, as the Terme funicular, which meets these characteristics, was opened in 1862, six months before the first section of the Metropolitan Railway in London.

== Current lines ==
=== Route map ===
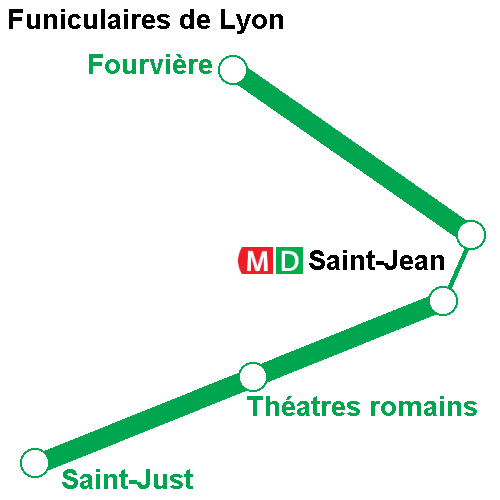

=== F1 (Saint-Jean - Saint-Just) ===
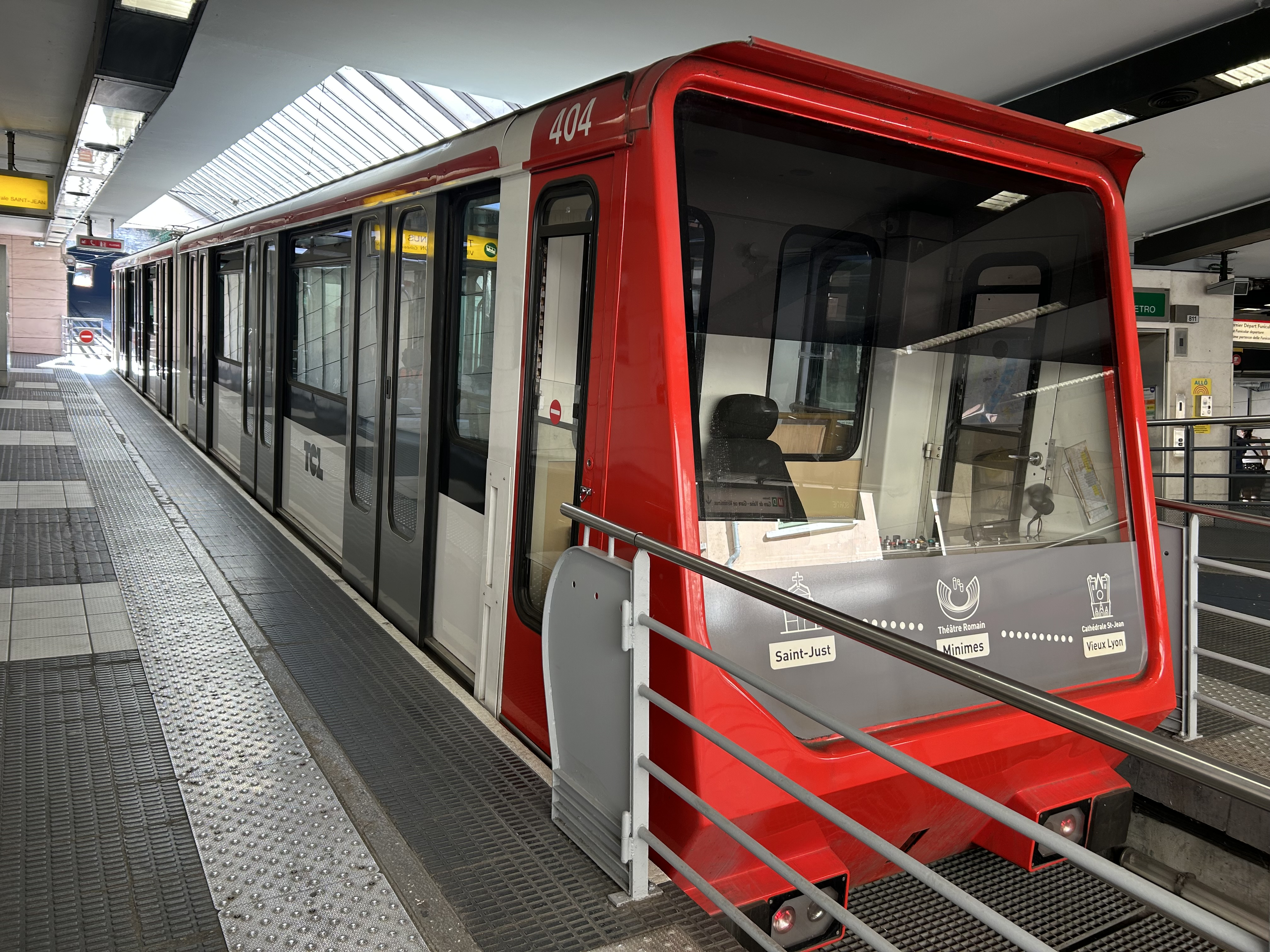
Funicular 1 of Lyon at Vieux-Lyon - Cathédrale Saint-Jean station in 2026.

Saint-Jean - Saint-Just	1,000 mm (3 ft 3 3/8 in) metre gauge
Length	791 metres (2,595 ft)
Height	91.2 metres (299 ft)
Number of stops	3
Fleet	2 funicular cars
Capacity	216 passengers
Length of journey	3 minutes 20 seconds
Opening times	05:00 to 24:00
Frequency of services	5 to 10 minutes

=== F2 (Saint-Jean - Fourvière) ===
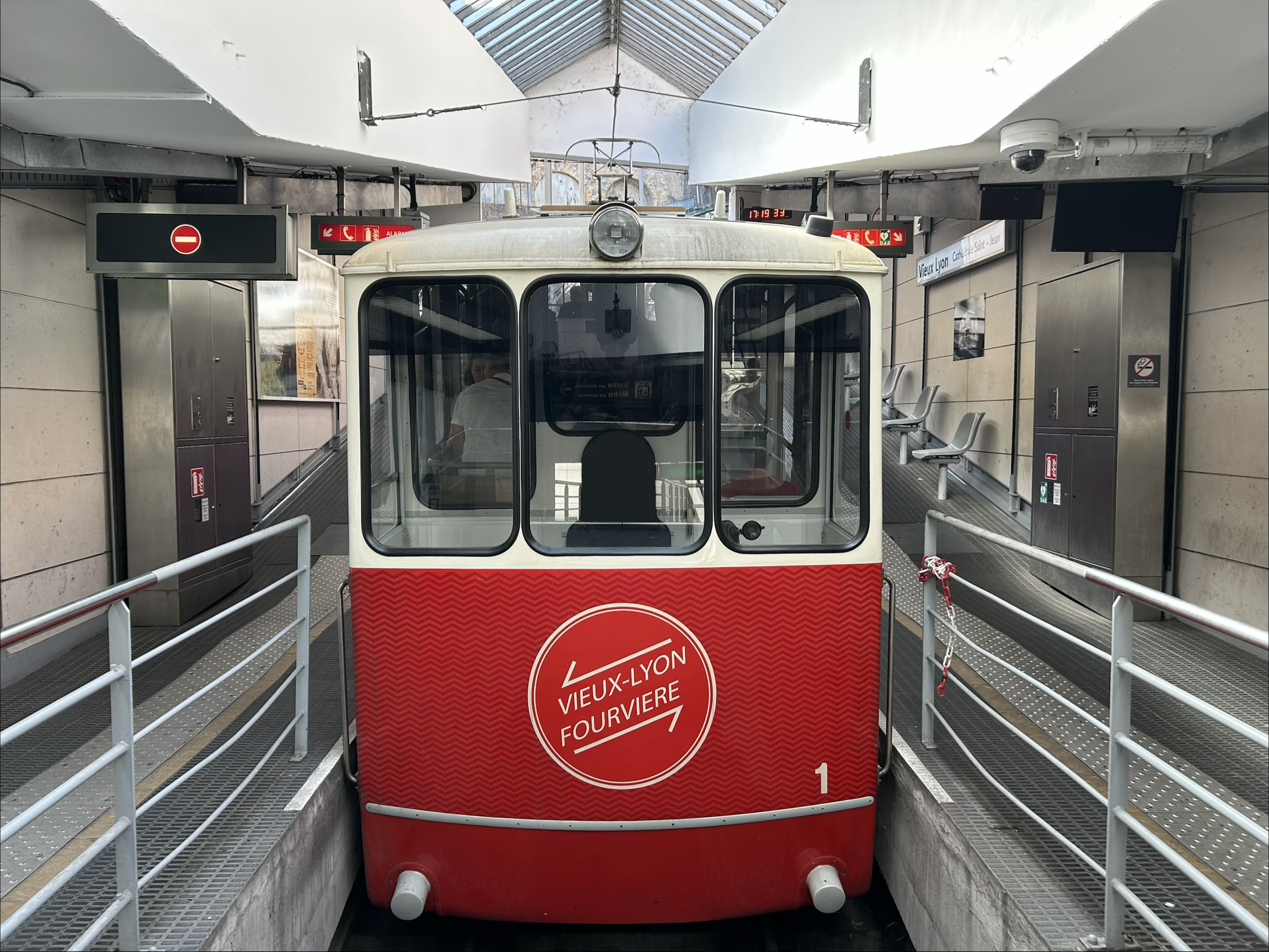
Funicular F2 at Vieux-Lyon - Cathédrale Saint-Jean station in 2026.

Saint-Jean - Fourvière	1,300 mm (4 ft 3 3/16 in)
Length	404 metres (1,325 ft)
Height	116 metres (381 ft)
Number of stops	2
Fleet	2 funicular cars
Capacity	70 passengers
Length of journey	2 minutes
Opening times	06:00 to 22:00
Frequency of services	5 to 10 minutes

== Late 2010s refurbishment ==
From January to June 2018, the Fourvière funicular was refurbished. This refurbishment included a revised livery, brighter and more open carriages, the carriages had a wheelchair space created, and new AC motors installed to replace the old DC motors.

From December 2018 to June 2019, St Just’s Funicular was closed for refurbishment. It received a new livery, similar to the livery on the upcoming MPL16s. It also received a new interior which is brighter and more spacious.

== Funicular cars in preservation ==
Funicular car n°1 is preserved at the AMTUIR (fr). It operated on the single track line from Saint-Jean to the Basilique de Fourvière. The line it served on was modernised in 1970 and equipped with new cars.

The car was given to the AMTUIR (Musée des Transports Urbains) by the Transports en Commun de la Région Lyonnaise (TCRL) on 27 May 1970.

Tramcar n°11 data	
Length	8.62 metres (28 ft 3 in)
Width	2.10 metres (6 ft 11 in)
Height	3.60 metres (11 ft 10 in)
Gross weight	6.2 t (6.1 long tons; 6.8 short tons)
Capacity	12/44
Current	By pantograph for lighting only.
Gauge	1,000 mm (3 ft 3 3/8 in) metre gauge

== See also ==
- List of funicular railways
