= Rubber-tyred metro =

Form of rapid transit

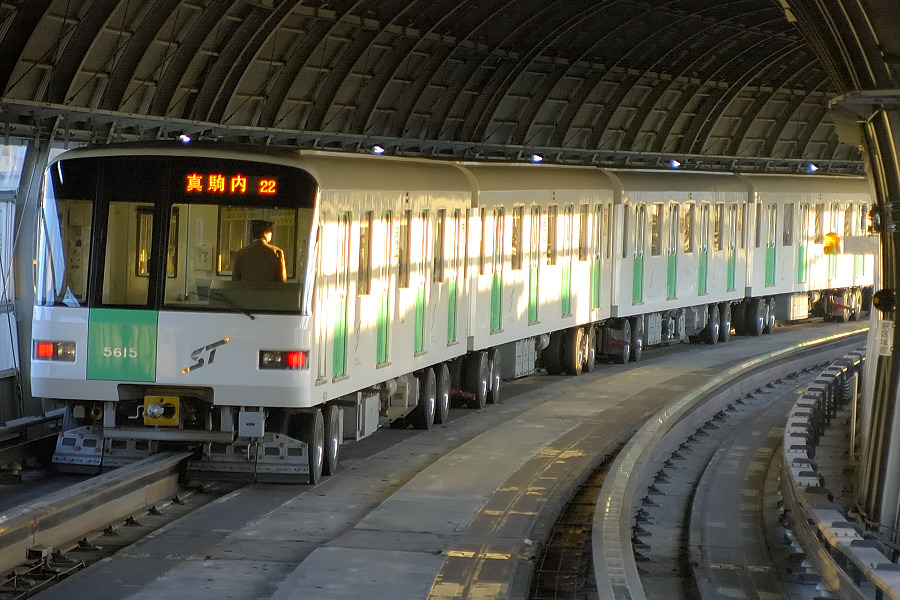
5000 series central rail-guided rubber-tyred rolling stock operated by Sapporo City Transportation Bureau, Japan, and built by Kawasaki Heavy Industries Rolling Stock Company

A rubber-tired metro or rubber-tyred metro is a form of rapid transit system that uses a mix of road and rail technology. The vehicles have wheels with rubber tyres that run on a roll way inside guide bars for traction. Traditional, flanged steel wheels running on rail tracks provide guidance through switches and act as backup if tyres fail. Most rubber-tyred trains are purpose-built and designed for the system on which they operate. Guided buses are sometimes referred to as 'trams on tyres', and compared to rubber-tyred metros.

== History ==
The first idea for rubber-tyred railway vehicles was the work of Scotsman Robert William Thomson, the original inventor of the pneumatic tyre. In his patent of 1846 he describes his 'Aerial Wheels' as being equally suitable for, "the ground or rail or track on which they run". The patent also included a drawing of such a railway, with the weight carried by pneumatic main wheels running on a flat board track and guidance provided by small horizontal steel wheels running on the sides of a central vertical guide rail. A similar arrangement was patented by Alejandro Goicoechea, inventor of Talgo, in February 1936, patent ES 141056. In 1973, he built a development of that patent: 'Tren Vertebrado', Patent DE1755198; at Avenida Marítima, in Las Palmas de Gran Canaria.

During the World War II German occupation of Paris, the Metro system was used to capacity, with relatively little maintenance performed. At the end of the war, the system was so worn that thought was given as to how to renovate it. Rubber-tyred metro technology was first applied to the Paris Métro, developed by Michelin, which provided the tyres and guidance system, in collaboration with Renault, which provided the vehicles. Starting in 1951, an experimental vehicle, the MP 51, operated on a test track between Porte des Lilas and Pré Saint Gervais, a section of line not open to the public.

Line 11 Châtelet – Mairie des Lilas was the first line to be converted, in 1956, chosen because of its steep grades. That was followed by Line 1 Château de Vincennes – Pont de Neuilly in 1964, and Line 4 Porte d'Orléans – Porte de Clignancourt in 1967, converted because they had the heaviest traffic load of all Paris Métro lines. Finally, Line 6 Charles de Gaulle – Étoile – Nation was converted in 1974, to reduce train noise on its many elevated sections. Because of the high cost of converting existing rail-based lines, other lines were not converted, but the new Paris Métro Line 14, which opened in 1998, was built with the rubber-tyred system.

The first completely rubber-tyred metro system was built in Montreal, Quebec, Canada, in 1966. The trains of the Santiago and Mexico City Metros are based on those of the Paris Métro. A few more recent rubber-tyred systems have used automated, driverless trains. One of the first such systems, developed by Matra, opened in 1983 in Lille, and others have since been built in Toulouse and Rennes. Paris Metro Line 14 was automated from its beginning (1998), and Line 1 was converted to automatic operation in 2007–2011. The first automated rubber-tyred system in Kobe, Japan, opened in February 1981. It is the Port Liner, linking Sannomiya railway station with Port Island.

== Technology ==
=== Overview ===
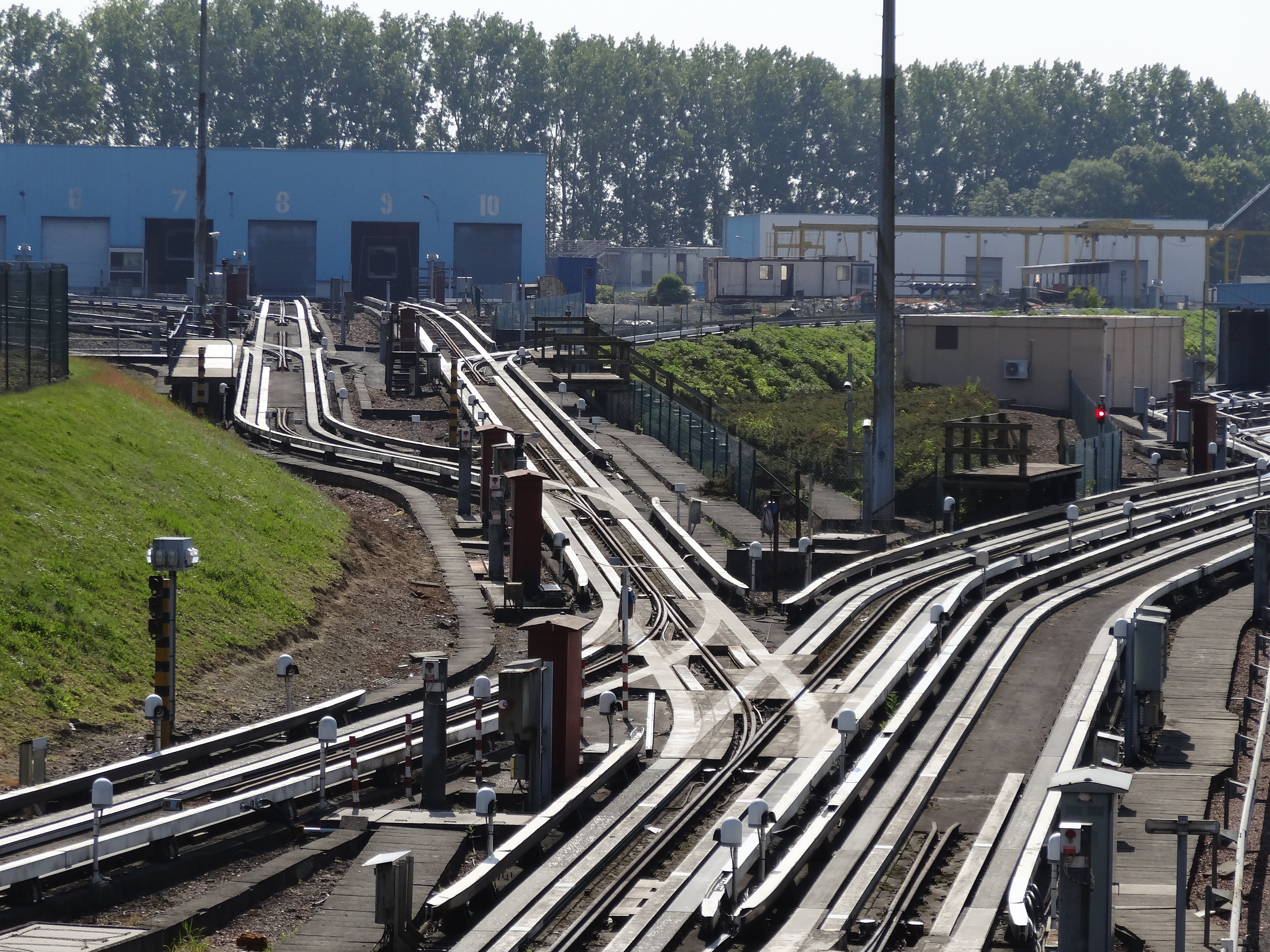
VAL tracks on the Lille Metro

Trains are usually in the form of electric multiple units. Just as on a conventional railway, the driver does not have to steer, with the system relying on some sort of guideway to direct the train. The type of guideway varies between networks. Most use two parallel roll ways, each the width of a tyre, which are made of various materials. The Montreal Metro, Lille Metro, Toulouse Metro, and most parts of Santiago Metro use concrete. The Busan Subway Line 4 employs a concrete slab. The Paris Métro, Mexico City Metro, and the non-underground section of Santiago Metro, use H-Shaped hot rolled steel, and the Sapporo Municipal Subway uses flat steel. The Sapporo system and Lille Metro use a single central guide rail only.

On some systems, such those in Paris, Montreal, and Mexico City, there is a conventional 1,435 mm (4 ft 8 1/2 in) standard gauge railway track between the roll ways. The bogies of the train include railway wheels with longer flanges than normal. These conventional wheels are normally just above the rails, but come into use in the case of a flat tyre, or at switches (points) and crossings. In Paris these rails were also used to enable mixed traffic, with rubber-tyred and steel-wheeled trains using the same track, particularly during conversion from normal railway track. The VAL system, used in Lille and Toulouse, has other sorts of flat-tyre compensation and switching methods.

On most systems, the electric power is supplied from one of the guide bars, which serves as a third rail. The current is picked up by a separate lateral pickup shoe. The return current passes via a return shoe to one or both of the conventional railway tracks, which are part of most systems, or to the other guide bar.

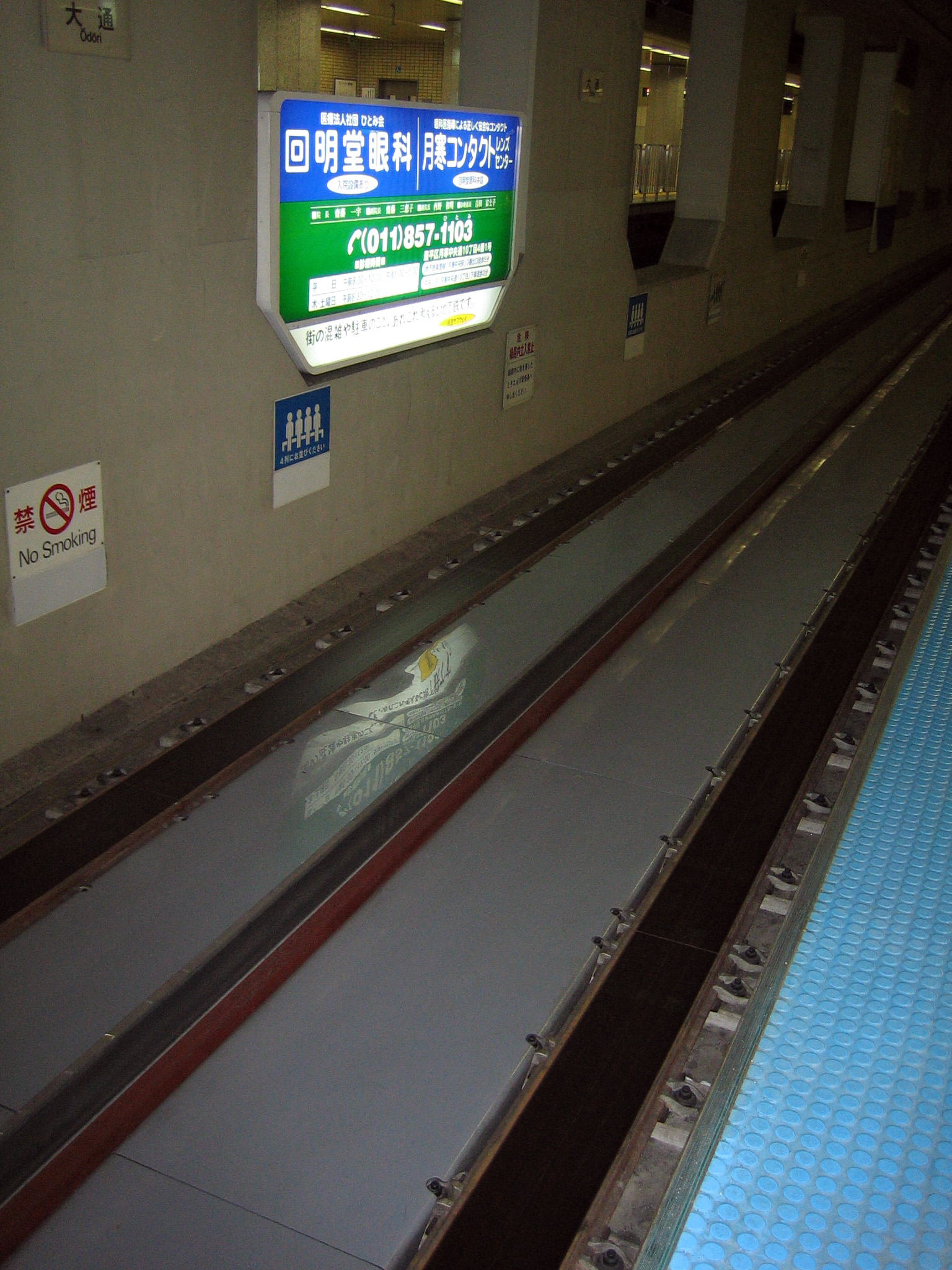
Sapporo Subway guide rail and flat steel roll ways

Rubber tyres have higher rolling resistance than traditional steel railway wheels. There are some advantages and disadvantages to increased rolling resistance, causing them to not be used in certain countries.

=== Advantages ===
Compared to steel wheel on steel rail, the advantages of rubber-tyred metro systems are:

- Faster acceleration, along with the ability to climb or descend steeper slopes (approximately a gradient of 13%) than would be feasible with conventional rail tracks, which would likely need a rack instead. (Note: Rubber-tyred wheels have better adhesion than traditional rail wheels. Nonetheless, modern steel-on-steel rolling stock using distributed-traction with a high proportion of powered axles have narrowed the gap to the performance found in rubber-tyred rolling stock.)
  - For example, the rubber-tyred Line 2 of the Lausanne Metro has grades of up to 12%.
- Shorter braking distances, allowing trains to be signalled closer together.
- Quieter rides in open air (both inside and outside the train).
- Smoother rides on geological unstable soils (as demonstrated by the Mexico City Metro, operating in the Valley of Mexico)
- Greatly reduced rail wear with resulting reduced maintenance costs of those parts.

=== Disadvantages ===
The higher friction and increased rolling resistance cause disadvantages (compared to steel wheel on steel rail):

- Higher energy consumption.
- Worse ride, when compared with well-maintained steel-on-steel systems.
- Possibility of tyre blow-outs - not possible in railway wheels.
- Higher cost of maintenance and manufacture.
- Normal operation generates more heat (from friction).
- Weather variance. (Applicable only to above-ground installations)
  - Loss of the traction advantage in inclement weather (snow and ice). (Note: In order to reduce weather disruption, the Montreal Metro runs completely underground. On Paris Métro Line 6, upgrades of tyres (as used with cars) and special ribbed tracks have been tried out. The southernmost section of the Sapporo Municipal Subway Namboku Line is also elevated, but is covered by an aluminum shelter to reduce weather disruption.)
- Same expense of steel rails for switching purposes, to provide electricity or grounding to the trains and as a safety backup. (Note: In effect, there are two systems running in parallel so it is more expensive to build, install and maintain. This is in turn an advantage for conversions to this technology because it can be done with less service disruptions on an existing line, and allows to use more widespread railway components compared to VAL for example.)
- Tyres that frequently need to be replaced, contrary to rails using steel wheels, which need to be replaced less often. (Note: Since rubber tyres have higher wear rates, they need more frequent replacement, which makes them more expensive in the long run than steel wheelsets with higher first cost (that may be needed anyway as backup). Rubber tyres for guidance are needed.)
- Tyres break down during use and turn into particulate matter (dust), which can be hazardous air pollution, also coating surrounding surfaces in dirty rubber dust.

Although it is a more complex technology, most rubber-tyred metro systems use quite simple techniques, in contrast to guided buses. Heat dissipation is an issue as eventually all traction energy consumed by the train — except the electric energy regenerated back into the substation during electrodynamic braking — will end up in losses (mostly heat). In frequently operated tunnels (typical metro operation) the extra heat from rubber tyres is a widespread problem, necessitating ventilation of the tunnels. As a result, some rubber-tyred metro systems do not have air-conditioned trains, as air conditioning would heat the tunnels to temperatures where operation is not possible.

== Similar technologies ==
Automated driverless systems are not exclusively rubber-tyred; many have since been built using conventional rail technology, such as London's Docklands Light Railway, the Copenhagen metro and Vancouver's SkyTrain, the Hong Kong Disneyland Resort line, which uses converted rolling stocks from non-driverless trains, as well as AirTrain JFK, which links JFK Airport in New York City with local subway and commuter trains. Most monorail manufacturers prefer rubber tyres.

== Different operation systems ==
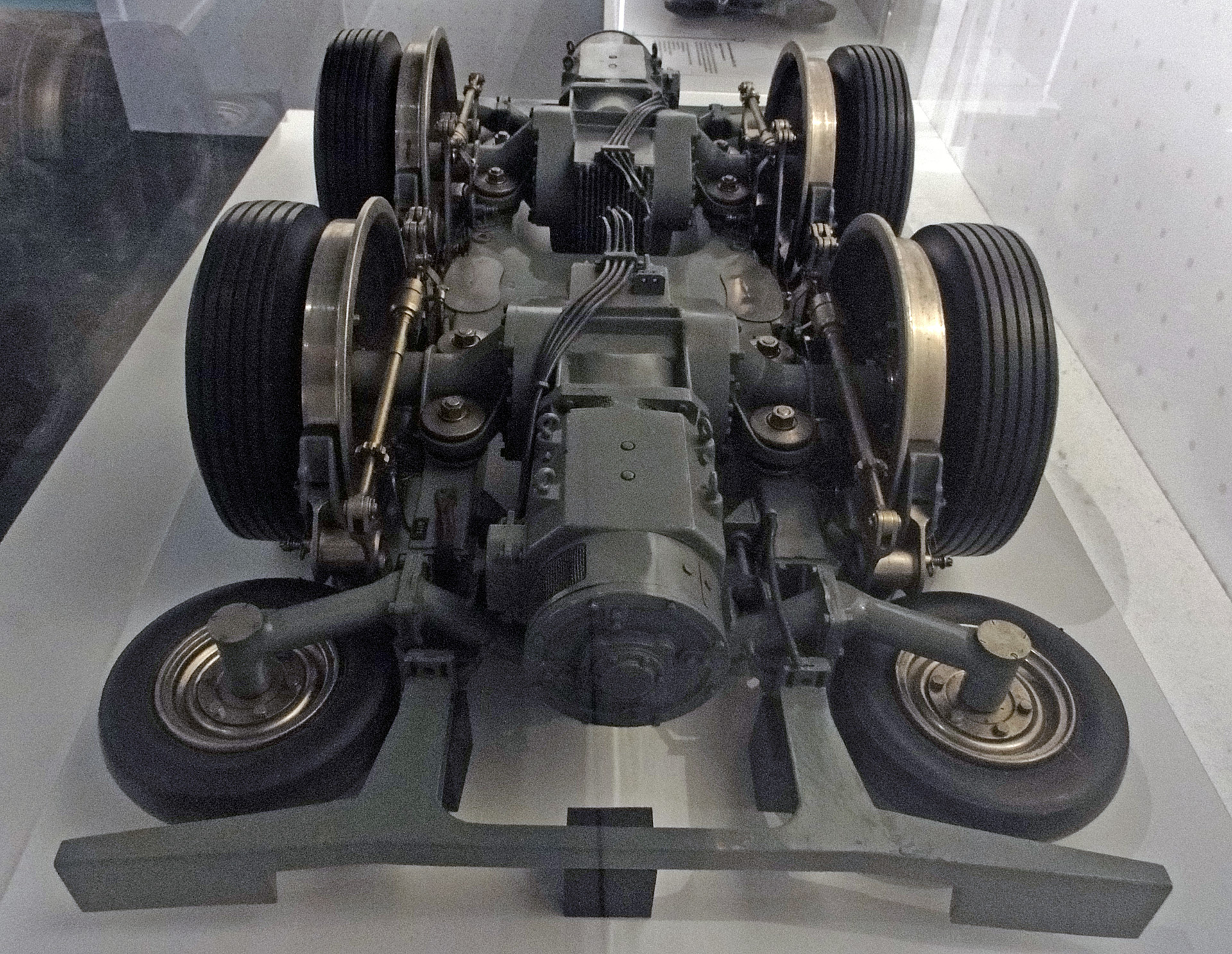
Paris Métro MP 55 bogie

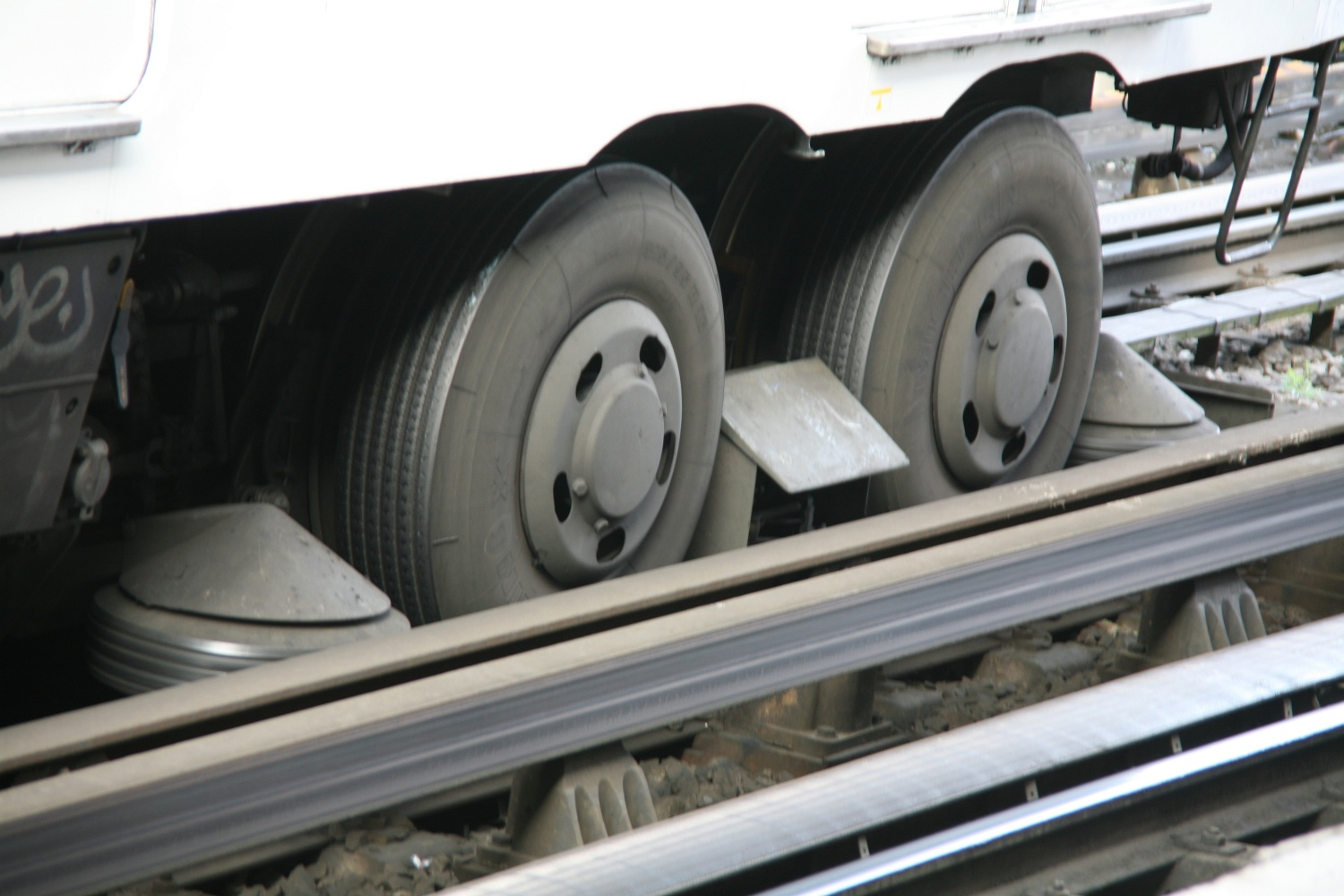
Paris Métro MP 73 Bogie

Paris Métro MP 73

Diagram of guide rail and wheel, Nancy and Caen tram on tyres

Guide rail and wheel diagram, Translohr

Feature	Rubber-tyred metro	Rubber-tyred tram
Summary	Rubber-tyred metros are essentially large, rubber-tired trains that run on specialized guideways with parallel rails and guide rails, designed for high-capacity transit systems like Paris and Montreal.	Rubber-tyred trams, such as the Translohr system, are more akin to guided buses or trams on tires, using a single central guiding rail instead of parallel guideways to achieve the same steep-gradient capabilities.
Primary purpose	High-capacity, high-performance rapid transit.	Light rail, less intense applications than a metro.
Track/guideway	Dedicated infrastructure with rollways for rubber tires and a separate steel rail for steel guidance wheels.	A single, central guiding rail on a concrete track.
Wheel configuration	Dual wheels: rubber-tyred wheels for traction and braking, and steel wheels with flanges for guidance.	Primarily rubber tires with a flange that engages the central guiding rail.
System complexity	Higher mechanical complexity due to multiple wheel types and specialized guideways.	Also mechanically complex, often using a single guiding rail system.
Vehicle type	Designed for high-speed metro operations, often purpose-built.	Can resemble a conventional tram or trolleybus but uses the guiding rail for direction.
Performance and cost	Better acceleration and braking, able to climb steeper gradients. High energy use, high maintenance for tires and guideway.	Capable of steeper gradients. Can have higher maintenance and air pollution from tires.

== List of rubber-tyred metro systems ==
This list is for Rubber-tyred metro systems. Not to be confused with Rubber-tyred tram systems.

Country/Region	City/Location	System	Technology	Year opened
Canada	Montreal	Montreal Metro	Bombardier MR-73 (Green, Blue, Yellow); Alstom/Bombardier MPM-10 (Orange, Green)	1966
Chile	Santiago	Santiago Metro (Lines 1, 2, and 5)	Alstom NS-74 (5); Concarril NS-88 (2); Alstom NS-93 (1, 5); Alstom NS-04 (2); CAF NS-07 (1); CAF NS-12 (1); Alstom NS-16 (2, 5)	1975
China	Chongqing	Bishan SkyShuttle	BYD Skyshuttle	2021
China	Guangzhou	Zhujiang New Town Automated People Mover System	Bombardier Innovia APM 100	2010
China	Shanghai	Shanghai Metro (Pujiang line)	Bombardier Innovia APM 300	2018
France	Lille	Lille Metro	Matra VAL206; Siemens VAL208	1983
France	Lyon	Lyon Metro (Lines A, B, and D)	Alstom MPL 75 (A, B); Alstom MPL 85 (D)	1978
France	Marseille	Marseille Metro	Alstom MPM 76	1977
France	Paris	Paris Métro (Lines 1, 4, 6, 11, and 14)	Michelin / Alstom, 1,435 mm between rollways	1958 (Note: The system opened in 1901, but was not converted to a rubber-tyred system until 1958.)
France	Paris Charles de Gaulle Airport	CDGVAL	Siemens VAL208	2007
France	Paris Orly Airport	Orlyval	Matra VAL206	1991
France	Rennes	Rennes Metro	Siemens VAL208 (A) Siemens Cityval (B)	2002
France	Toulouse	Toulouse Metro	Matra VAL206; Siemens VAL208	1993
Germany	Frankfurt Airport	SkyLine	Bombardier Innovia APM 100 (as Adtranz CX-100)	1994
Germany	Munich Airport		Bombardier Innovia APM 300	2015
Hong Kong	Hong Kong International Airport	Automated People Mover	Mitsubishi Crystal Mover; Ishikawajima-Harima	1998; 2007 (Phase II)
Indonesia	Soekarno–Hatta International Airport	Soekarno–Hatta Airport Skytrain	Woojin	2017
Italy	Turin	Metrotorino	Siemens VAL208	2006
Japan	Hiroshima	Hiroshima Rapid Transit (Astram Line)	Kawasaki; Mitsubishi; Niigata Transys	1994
Japan	Kobe	Kobe New Transit (Port Island Line / Rokkō Island Line)	Kawasaki	1981 (Port Island Line); 1990 (Rokkō Island Line)
Japan	Osaka	Nankō Port Town Line	Niigata Transys	1981
Japan	Saitama	New Shuttle		1983
Japan	Sakura	Yamaman Yūkarigaoka Line	Nippon Sharyo	1982
Japan	Sapporo	Sapporo Municipal Subway	Kawasaki	1971
Japan	Tokorozawa / Higashimurayama	Seibu Yamaguchi Line	Niigata Transys	1985
Japan	Tokyo	Nippori–Toneri Liner	Niigata Transys	2008
Japan	Tokyo	Yurikamome	Mitsubishi; Niigata Transys; Nippon Sharyo; Tokyu	1995
Japan	Yokohama	Kanazawa Seaside Line	Mitsubishi; Niigata Transys; Nippon Sharyo; Tokyu	1989
South Korea	Busan	Busan Subway Line 4	K-AGT (Woojin)	2011
South Korea	Seoul	Sillim Line	K-AGT (Woojin)	2022
South Korea	Uijeongbu	U Line	Siemens VAL208	2012
Macau	Macau, Taipa, and Cotai	Macau Light Rapid Transit	Mitsubishi Crystal Mover	2019
Malaysia	Kuala Lumpur International Airport	Aerotrain	Bombardier Innovia APM 100 (as Adtranz CX-100)	1998
Mexico	Mexico City	Mexico City Metro (All lines except A & 12)	Michelin, 1,435 mm (4 ft 8 1/2 in) between rollways	1969
Singapore	Singapore	Light Rail Transit	Bombardier Innovia APM 100 (C801 [as Adtranz CX-100] and C801A) and future APM 300R (C801B); Mitsubishi Crystal Mover (C810 and C810A)	1999
Switzerland	Lausanne	Lausanne Metro Line M2	Alstom MP 89	2008
Taiwan	Taipei	Taipei Metro Brown Line	Matra/GEC Alsthom VAL 256; Bombardier Innovia APM 256	1996
Taiwan	Taoyuan Airport	Taoyuan International Airport Skytrain	Niigata Transys	2018
Thailand	Bangkok	Gold Line	Bombardier Innovia APM 300	2020
UAE	Dubai International Airport	Dubai International Airport Automated People Mover	Mitsubishi Crystal Mover (Terminal 3); Bombardier Innovia APM 300 (Terminal 1)	2013
United Kingdom	London Gatwick Airport	Terminal-Rail Shuttle	Bombardier Innovia APM 100 (Replaced C-100s)	1988
United Kingdom	London Heathrow Airport	Heathrow Terminal 5 Transit	Bombardier Innovia APM 200	2008
United Kingdom	London Stansted Airport	Stansted Airport Transit System	Westinghouse/Adtranz C-100; Adtranz/Bombardier CX-100	1991
United States	Chicago O'Hare International Airport	Airport Transit System	Bombardier Innovia APM 256 (Replaced VAL256s in 2019)	1993–2018 (VAL), 2021 (Innovia)
United States	Dallas Fort Worth International Airport	Skylink	Bombardier Innovia APM 200	2007
United States	Denver International Airport	Automated Guideway Transit System	Bombardier Innovia APM 100	1995
United States	George Bush Intercontinental Airport	Skyway	Bombardier Innovia APM 100 (as Adtranz CX-100)	1999
United States	Hartsfield–Jackson Atlanta International Airport	ATL SkyTrain	Mitsubishi Heavy Industries Crystal Mover	2009
United States	Hartsfield–Jackson Atlanta International Airport	The Plane Train	Westinghouse C-100/Bombardier Innovia APM 100	1980
United States	Miami	Metromover	Bombardier Innovia APM 100 (Replaced C-100s late 2014)	1986
United States	Phoenix Sky Harbor International Airport	PHX Sky Train	Bombardier Innovia APM 200	2013
United States	San Francisco International Airport	AirTrain (San Francisco International Airport)	Bombardier Innovia APM 100	2003
United States	Washington Dulles International Airport	AeroTrain	Mitsubishi Heavy Industries Crystal Mover	2010

=== Under construction ===
Country/Region	City/Location	System
South Korea	Busan	Busan Metro Line 5
United States	Los Angeles International Airport	SkyLink

=== Defunct systems ===
Country/Region	City	System	Technology	Year opened	Year closed
France	Laon	Poma 2000	Cable-driven	1989	2016
Japan	Komaki	Peachliner	Nippon Sharyo	1991	2006

== See also ==
- Budd–Michelin rubber-tired rail cars
- Flat tire
- Guided bus
- Hybrid systems
- Light metro#List of light metro systems
- Micheline (railcar)
- Outline of tires
- Railway electrification system
- Rubber-tyred trams
- Tire (also spelled tyre)
- Toronto Zoo Domain Ride
- Tünel – a rubber-tyred funicular in Istanbul, Turkey
- VAL (Véhicule Automatique Léger)
