= 4th arrondissement of Lyon =

- Municipal arrondissement
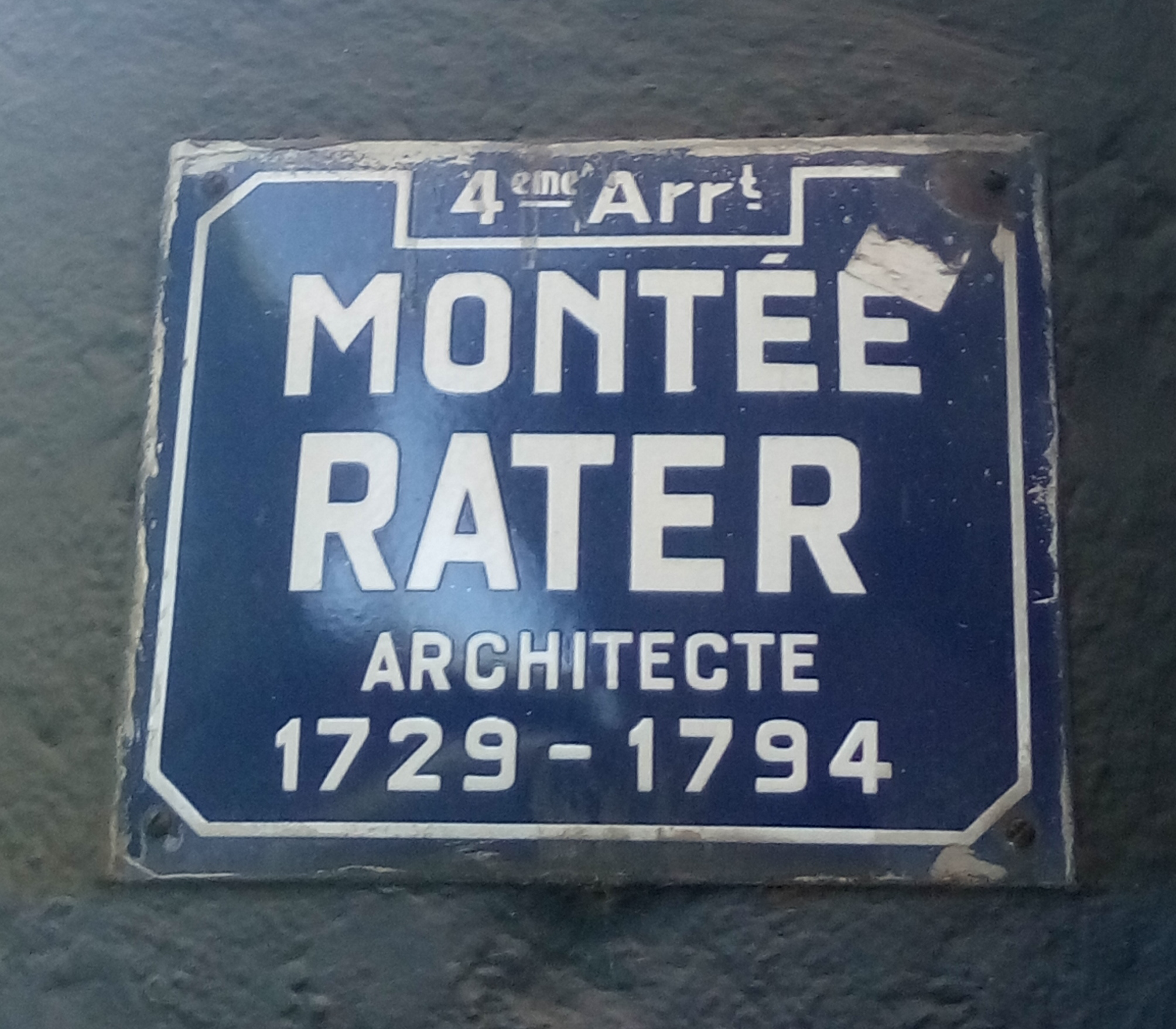
- Street sign in the 4th arrondissement

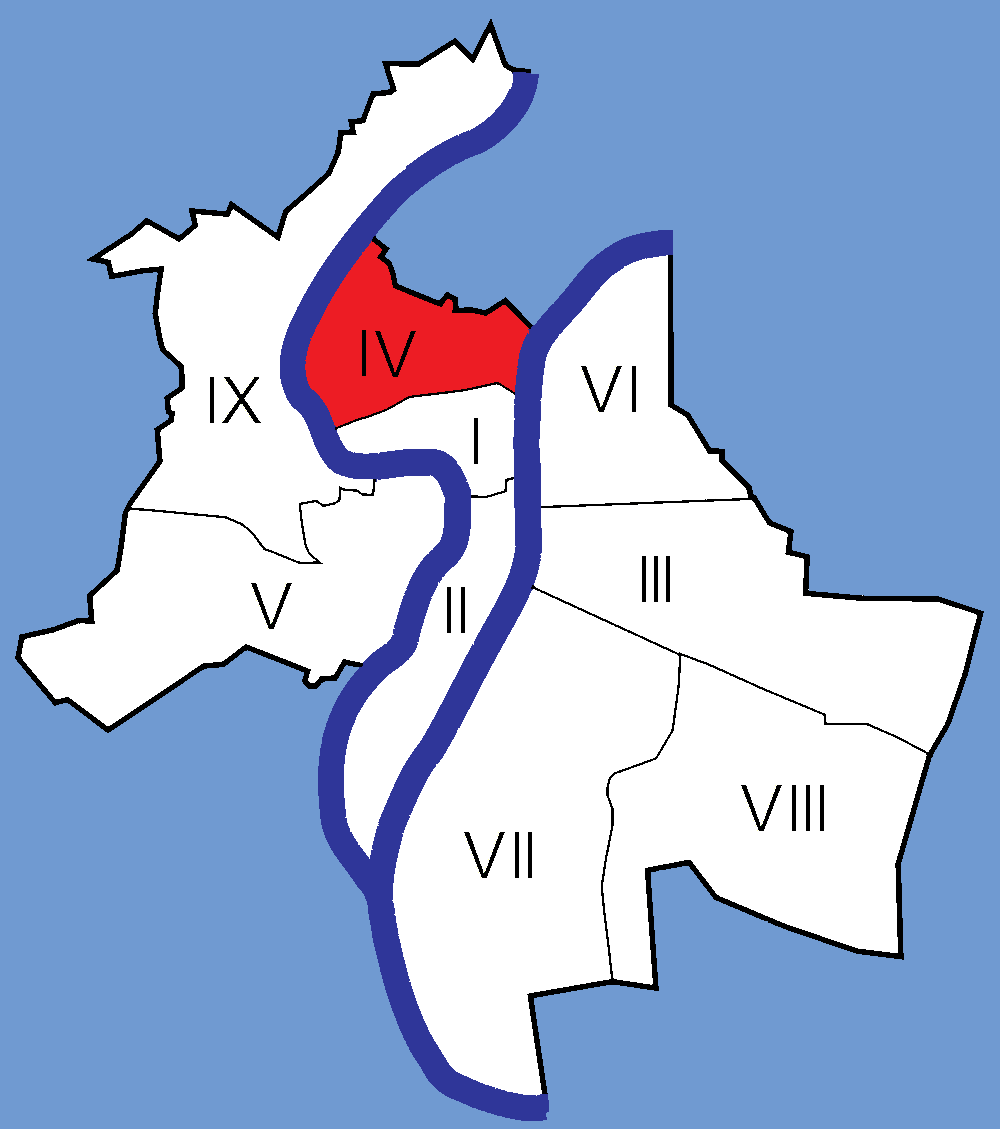
- Location within Lyon
- Coordinates: 45°46′41″N 4°49′41″E
- Country: France
- Region: Auvergne-Rhône-Alpes
- Department: Lyon Metropolis
- Commune: Lyon

Government
  - Mayor (2020–2026): Rémi Zinck (EELV)
- Area: 2.93 km^{2} (1.13 sq mi)
- Population (2023): 34,752
  - Density: 11,900/km^{2} (30,700/sq mi)
- INSEE code: 69384

The nine arrondissements of Lyon

Arrondissements of Lyon

The 4th arrondissement of Lyon (French: 4^{e} arrondissement de Lyon) is one of the nine arrondissements of the City of Lyon.

== History ==
The 4th arrondissement of Lyon was created on 24 March 1852 (date of creation of the first five arrondissements), with the same borders of the old town of La Croix-Rousse.

Dominique Bolliet (PS) is currently the mayor of this arrondissement.

== Geography and equipments ==
=== Area and demography ===
- 293 ha (720 acres)
- 2006 : 34 302 inhabitants
- Relative density : 11,535 inhabitants per square kilometre (29,880/sq mi)

=== Quarters ===
- Plateau de la Croix-Rousse
- Serin-Gillet
- Gros Caillou

=== Streets and squares ===
- Place de la Croix-Rousse
- Boulevard de la Croix-Rousse
- Grande Rue de la Croix-Rousse
- Boulevard des Canuts
- Rue Hénon
- Montée de la Boucle
- Esplanade du Gros Caillou
- Parc de la Cerisaie
- Parc Francis Popy
- Parc du Clos Carret
- Rue d'Austerlitz
- Rue Dumenge

== Animation ==
=== Sportive equipments ===
- Stade Grégory Coupet
- le Clos Jouve (Haut lieu de la Boule Lyonnaise)

=== Monuments and buildings ===
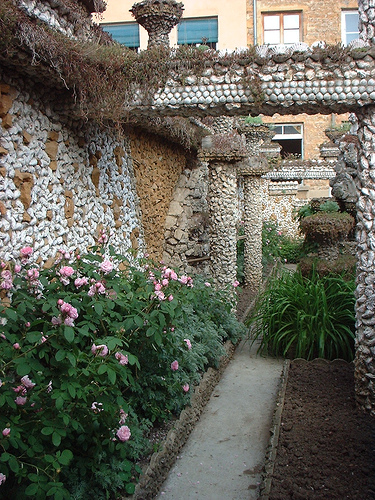
Jardin Rosa Mir

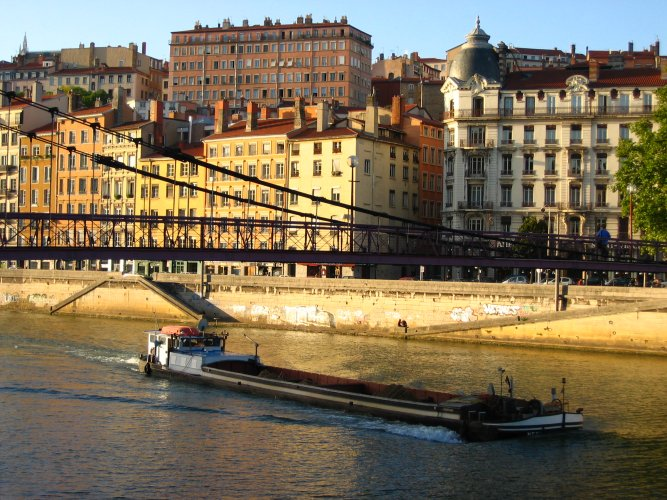
The Maison Brunet, viewed from the Saône

- Statue de Jacquard
- Jardin Rosa Mir
- Villa Gillet
- Maison Brunet
- Sculpture Le Chant des Canuts, a 1984 statue made by Georges Salendre, and installed in a square near the city hall

=== Art ===
- Théâtre de la Croix-Rousse
- Maison des Canuts

=== Events ===
- Every day except Monday, the market in La Croix-Rousse (a bio market on Saturday morning), located along the boulevard de la Croix-Rousse, on nearly 1 km
- Every Saturday and Sunday morning, the town crier
- Every year in September, the harvest of the République des Canuts (Parc de la Cerisaie)
- Every year in October and November, the chestnuts vogue
- During the second weekend of September, the Grande Braderie, located the Grande Rue and the Place de la Croix-Rousse

=== Transports ===
This zone is served by :

- Metro :
- Buses : 2, 33, 45, 61
- Trolleybuses : S6, C13, C18

== See also ==
- List of the streets in Lyon
- Lyon
- Arrondissement of Lyon
- History of Lyon
