= Rue d'Austerlitz =

Street in Lyon, France

- Rue des Fossés
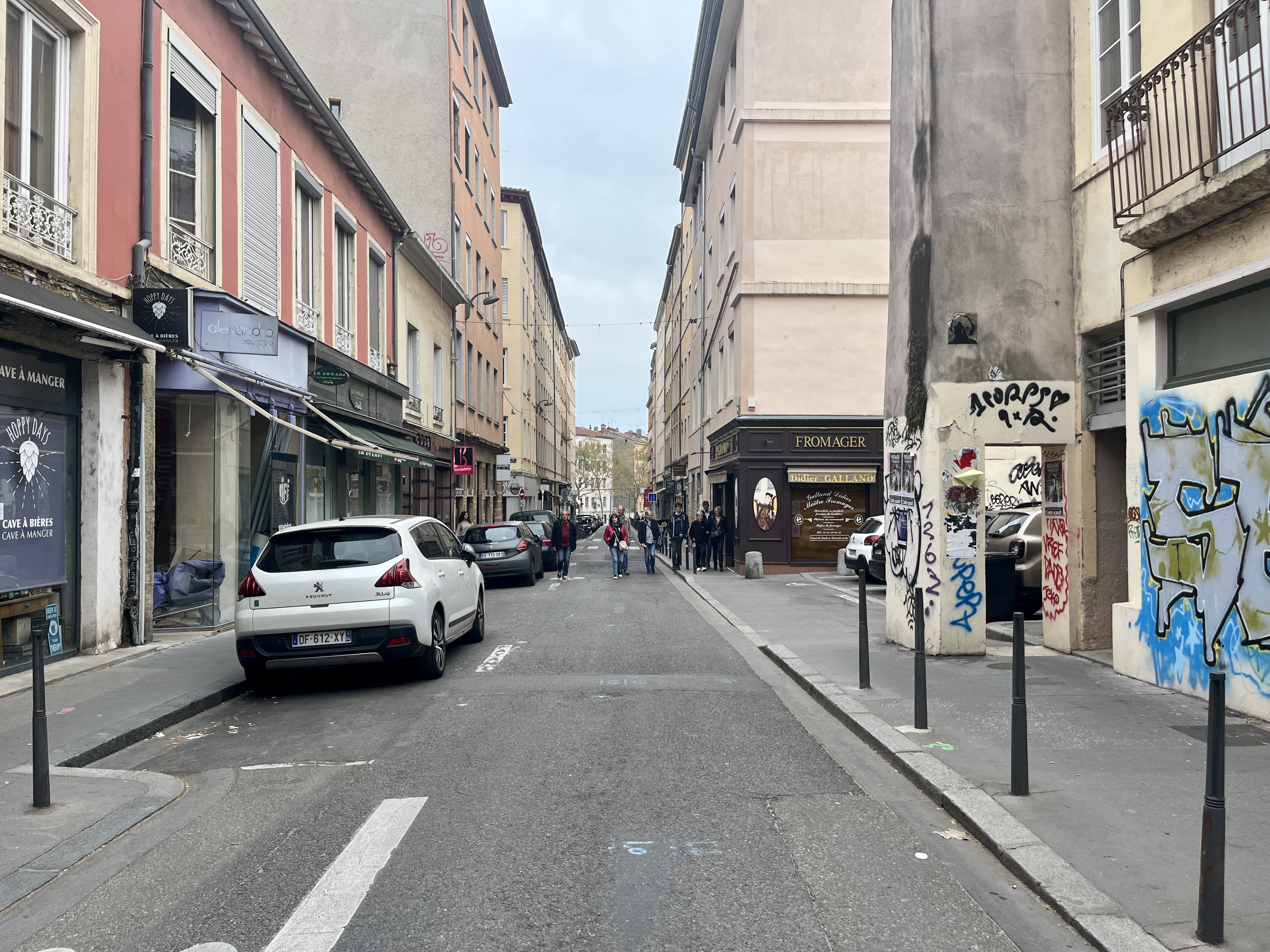
- Interactive map of Rue d'Austerlitz
- Location: 4th arrondissement of Lyon, Lyon, France
- Postal code: 69004
- Coordinates: 45.775755°N 4.834078°E

Construction
- Construction start: 1812

The Rue d'Austerlitz is a street in the 4th arrondissement of Lyon, in La Croix-Rousse quarter. It begins on the Rue du Mail, at the corner of the Place de la Croix-Rousse, crosses the Rue du Pavilion, the Rue de Belfort and the Rue Aimé Boussange, and ends on the Place Bellevue. Its name refers to the Battle of Austerlitz, one of the greatest victories of Napoleon. There are metro and velo'v stations.

== History ==
Nearby the Rue Dumenge, the Rue d'Austerlitz was originally named the Rue des Fossés because it ran along the ditches dug at the base of the old wall. It was formed in 1812 during the creation of the "clos Dumenge" composed of buildings or workshops specially designed for weavers (the canuts). The Voraces had their headquarters in the cafe of the Mère Marshal in 1848, at the corner of the Rue du Mail. The street was eventually named Rue d'Austrelitz after deliberation of the Municipal Council on 4 August 1854, during the Second Empire. The upper part of the street was part of the town which was developed in front of the door of La Croix-Rousse from the 15th century. The No. 4 was offered to the Hospices of Lyon on 7 March 1900.

In the past, there were a military gymnasium, and a greenspace that still exists today in the street. In fact, there were five streets which were named after the victories of the battles of Napoleon Bonaparte: Marengo, Lodi, Jena, Eylau and Austerlitz. However, among them, only the Rue Austerlitz has retained its name until today.

== Architecture and events ==
The street starts with old one-floor houses, then with higher facades. After the Rue de Belfast, there were buildings only on the eastern side : simple facades of 19th century canuts houses. The apartments are typical of the canuts architecture : particularly high, in the goal of installing the looms, and bright. The bottom of these buildings consisted of small shops, often businesses selling main foods. The Rue d'Austerlitz, far more than its neighbor the Rue Dumenge, has retained its commercial vocation. In front, there is the garden Deswarte. At Nos. 21 and 23, two plaques pay tribute to painters E. Brouillard and G. N'Guyen who lived in the street.

The association of merchants on the street regularly organizes events, including a giant Advent calendar, some windows on the street are numbered and each day one of them opens, revealing a person who distributes sweets to passersby. Within the scoop of the 2008 Fête des Lumières, there were also a Tic Tac Toe using the windows of inhabitants and a Giant Tetris to which passersby played with a carpet underfoot.
