= Técély card =

Contactless smart card for public transport in Lyon

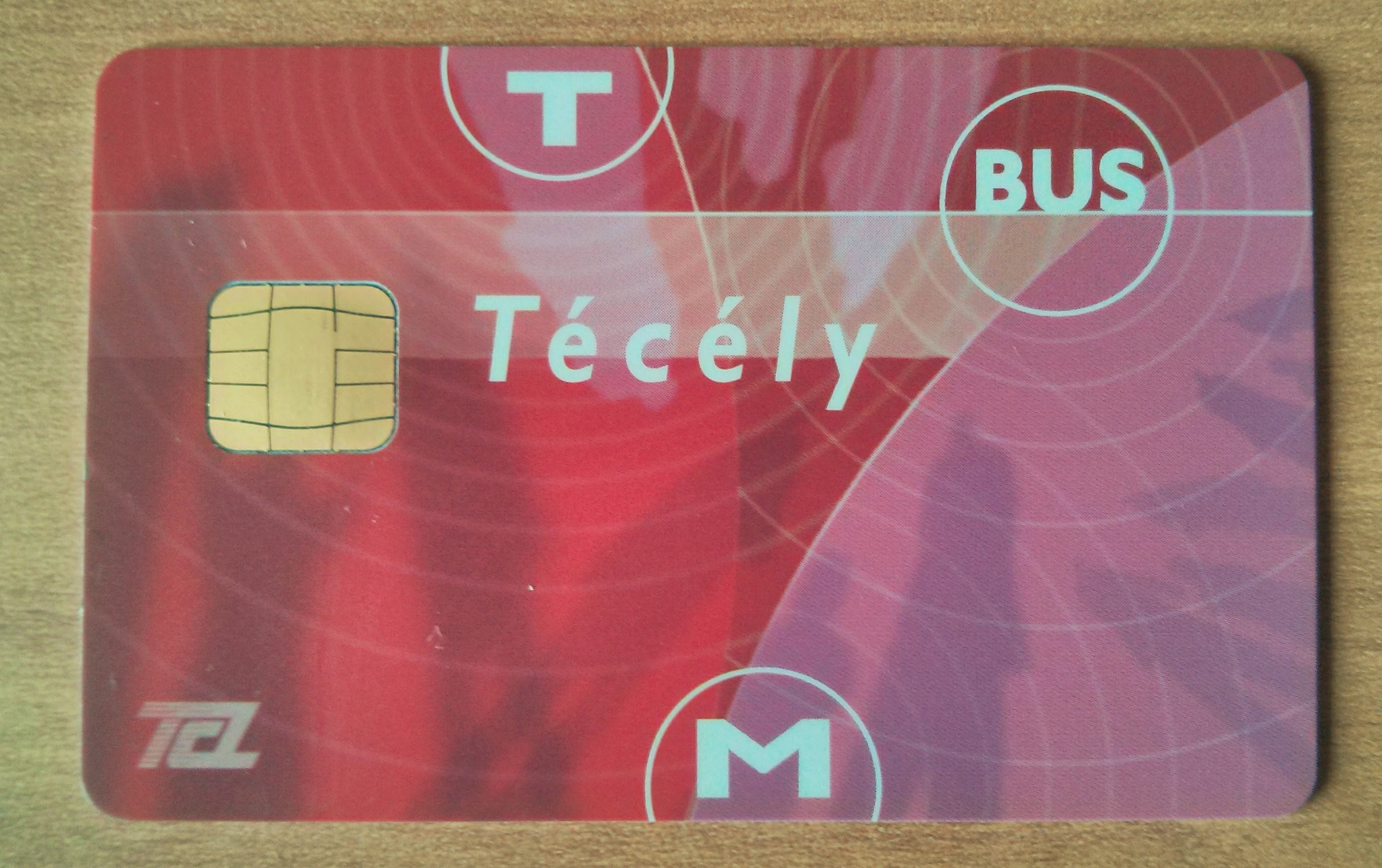
- Location: Lyon, France
- Launched: 1 July 2002
- Validity: TCL (métro, funicular, tram, bus, trolleybus)
- Retailed: TCL agencies (get a new card, recharge a card); Mail order (get a new card); TCL ticket machines (recharge a card); TCL service points (recharge a card); ATMs of CIC and Crédit Mutuel (recharge a card)
- Website: La carte TCL (in French)

The Técély card (TCL card) is the smartcard of TCL, the public transport network in Lyon, France, launched on 1 July 2002. Unlike other smartcards, where a topup amount is required at the start and is deducted each time a passenger makes a trip, the TCL card has a €5 fee, and the option to put on either a weekly or monthly pass on top of this. This must be renewed every week or month keep the card usable. The card expires five years after its purchase date.
