= Hôtel de Ville–Louis Pradel station =

Metro station in Lyon, France

Hôtel de Ville–Louis Pradel
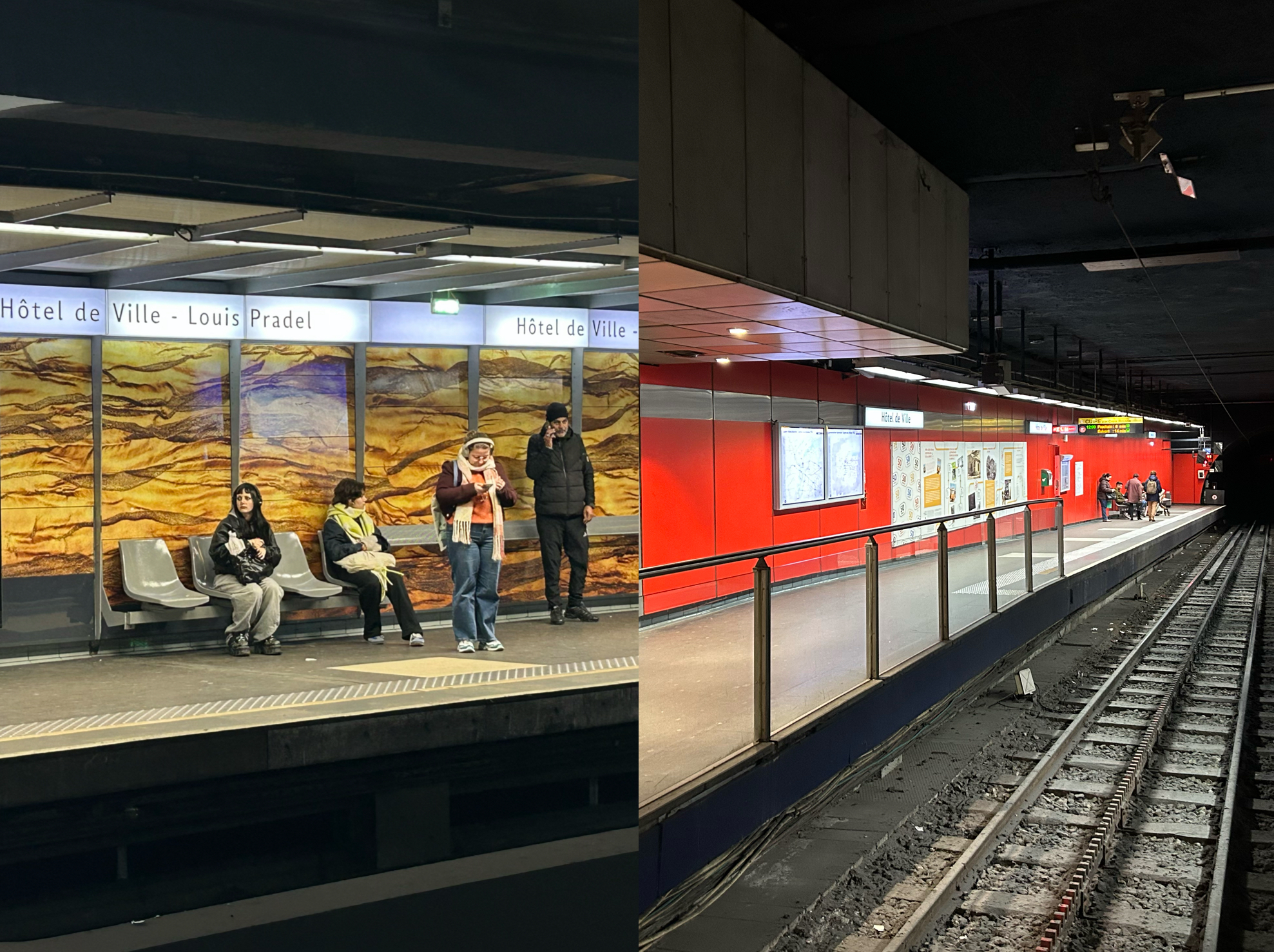

General information
- Location: 1st arrondissement of Lyon; France
- Coordinates: 45°46′04″N 4°50′10″E
- System: Lyon Métro station
- Owner: SYTRAL Mobilités (in French)
- Operator: TCL
- Line: Lyon Metro Lyon Metro Line A Lyon Metro Line C
- Platforms: Line A: 2 side platforms Line C: 1 side platform, 1 island platform
- Tracks: Line A: 2 Line C: 2

Construction
- Structure type: Underground
- Accessible: Yes

History
- Opened: 2 May 1978

Services
| Preceding station | Lyon Metro | Following station |
|---|---|---|
| Cordeliers towards Perrache | Line A | Foch towards Vaulx-en-Velin–La Soie |
| Terminus | Line C | Croix-Paquet towards Cuire |
Location

Hôtel de Ville–Louis Pradel [o.tɛl də vil lwi pʁa.dɛl] is a transfer station in the Lyon Metro, providing a connection between lines A and C. The station is located in the Presqu'île of Lyon, France. Serving Lyon's 1st arrondissement, the station is near Lyon City Hall with access to Place des Terreaux, Opéra Nouvel, Museum of Fine Arts of Lyon, and other nearby attractions. The station is a major interchange and is Line C's southern terminus providing its only connection with the rest of the metro system.

== History ==
Hôtel de Ville–Louis Pradel station opened on May 2, 1978. The opening of the station coincided with the opening of Line A and the extension of Line C which had previously been operating since 1974.

It is named for the Hôtel de Ville (town hall) and the Place Louis-Pradel, which is named for Louis Pradel, mayor 1957–76.

== Station Layout ==
The upper level of Hôtel de Ville–Louis Pradel station consists of side platforms for Line A. The lower level consists of Line C's terminus utilizing a Spanish solution track layout. The central platform for Line C contains a number of pillars immediately adjacent to the railway tracks that may block the doors for exiting MCL 80 trains used on this line.

== Gallery ==
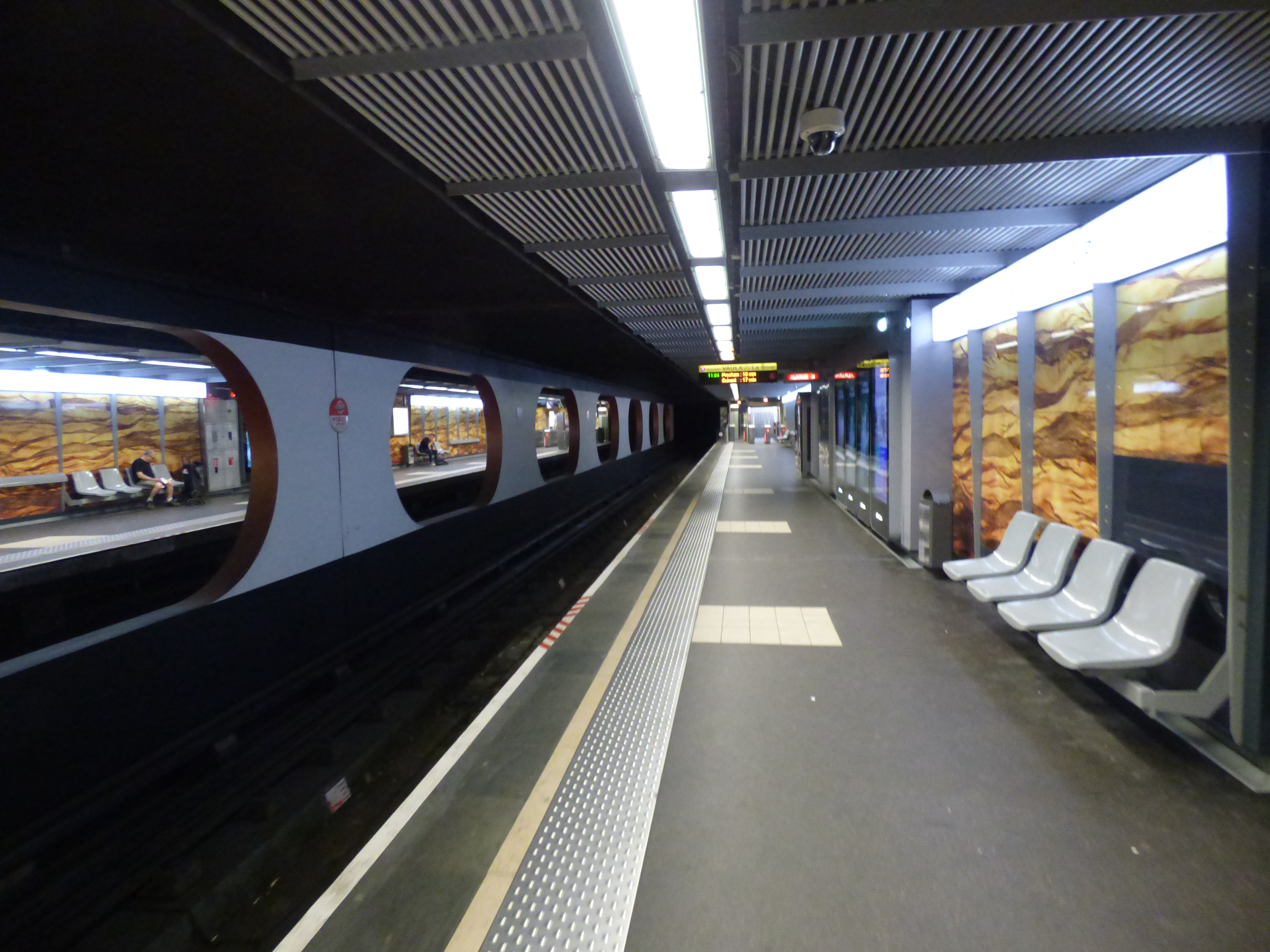
Line A eastbound platform

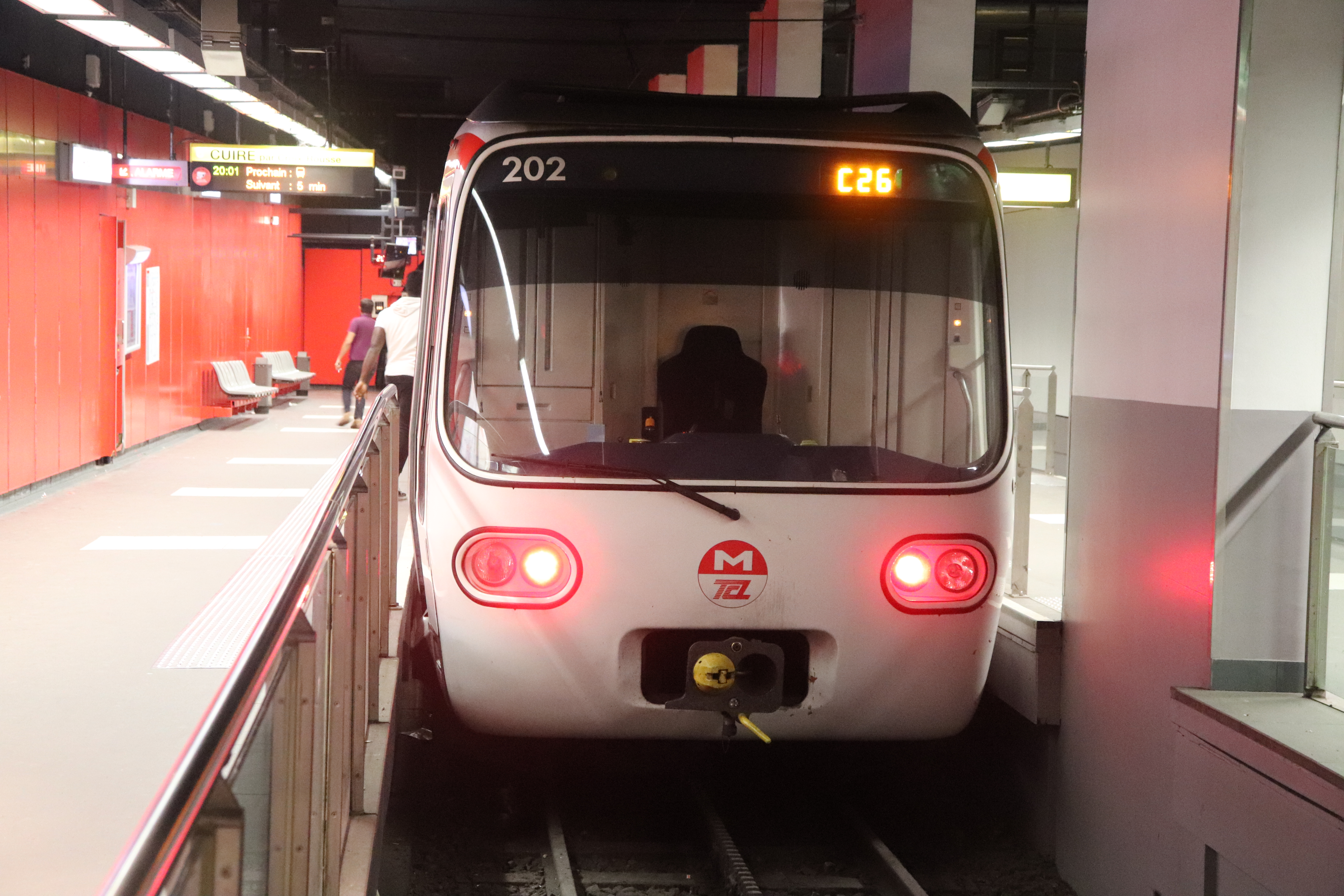
Line C platforms

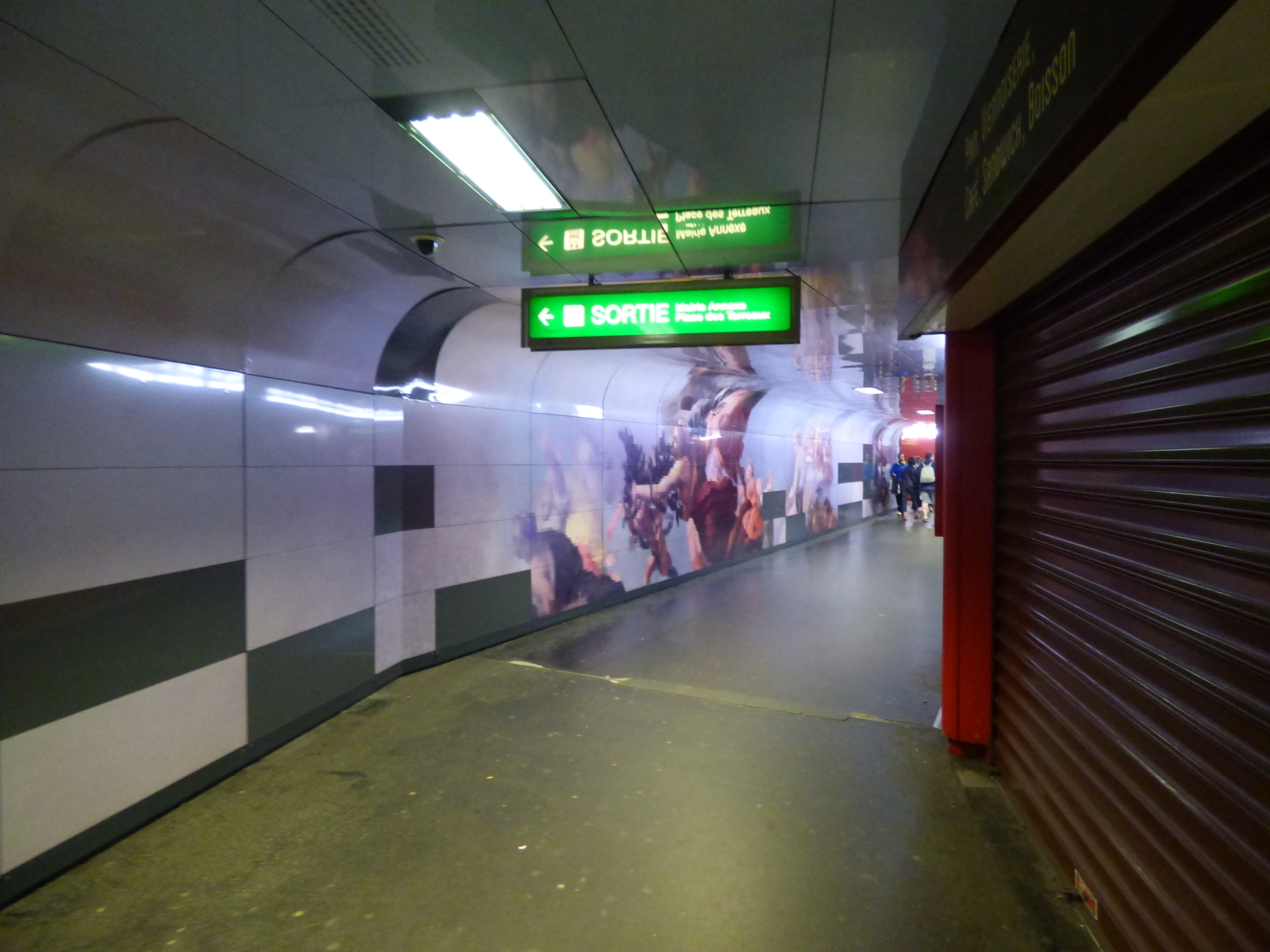
A corridor of the station
