= Lyon Metro Line C =

Metro line in Lyon, France

Line C

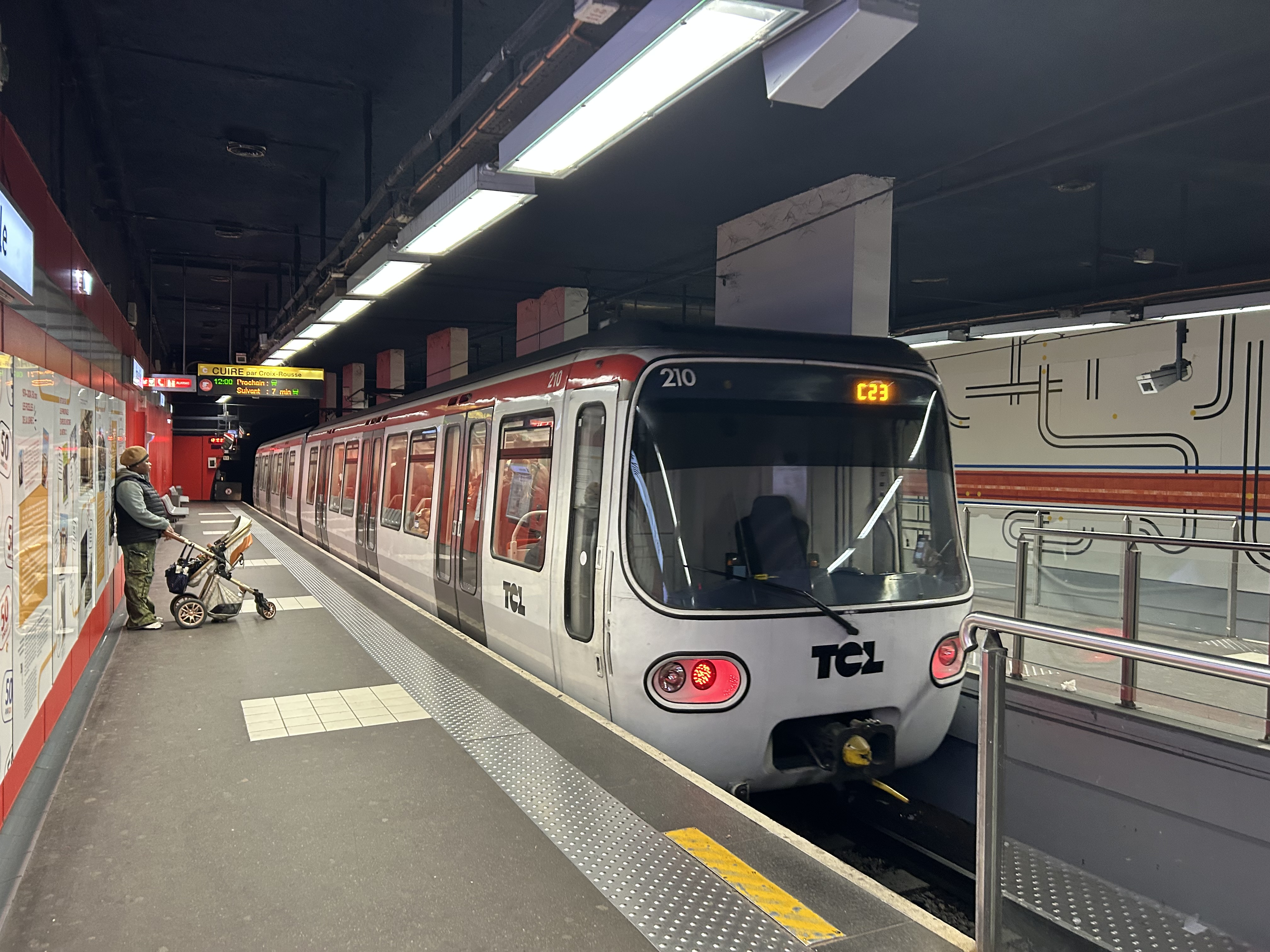

Overview
- Native name: Ligne C
- Termini: Hôtel de Ville–Louis Pradel; Cuire
- Connecting lines: Lyon Metro Lyon Metro Line A
- Stations: 5

Service
- Type: Rapid transit with racks
- System: Lyon Metro
- Operator: TCL
- Rolling stock: MCL 80
- Ridership: Annual: 10,217,000 (2019)

History
- Opened: 12 April 1891 (funicular); 6 December 1974 (metro)
- Last extension: 8 December 1984
- Closed: 3 July 1972 (funicular)

Technical
- Line length: 2.4 km (1.5 mi)
- Rack system: Von-Roll
- Track gauge: 1,435 mm (4 ft 8 1/2 in) standard gauge
- Electrification: 750 V DC overhead line
- Maximum incline: 17%
- Average inter-station distance: 625 m (2,051 ft)

Line C (Ligne C) of the Lyon Metro is the modern incarnation of the Funiculaire Croix-Rousse – Croix-Paquet (Croix-Rousse – Croix-Paquet Funicular), an old cable-hauled railway operating on part of the current alignment.

== History ==
In 1891 the original funicular line was opened, running between its namesake stations. After surviving the closure of the nearby funiculaire Rue Terme – Croix-Rousse in 1967, this line closed in 1972 for refurbishment and conversion to rack railway technology, reopening for service in 1974 (four years before lines A and B opened). When it was integrated with the metro as Lyon Metro Line C in 1978, the line's southern end was extended from Croix-Paquet to Hôtel-de-Ville (City Hall), also equipped with rack rail. A further extension of Line C opened on 8 December 1984, when its northern end was extended from Croix-Rousse to Cuire as an adhesion railway (no rack).

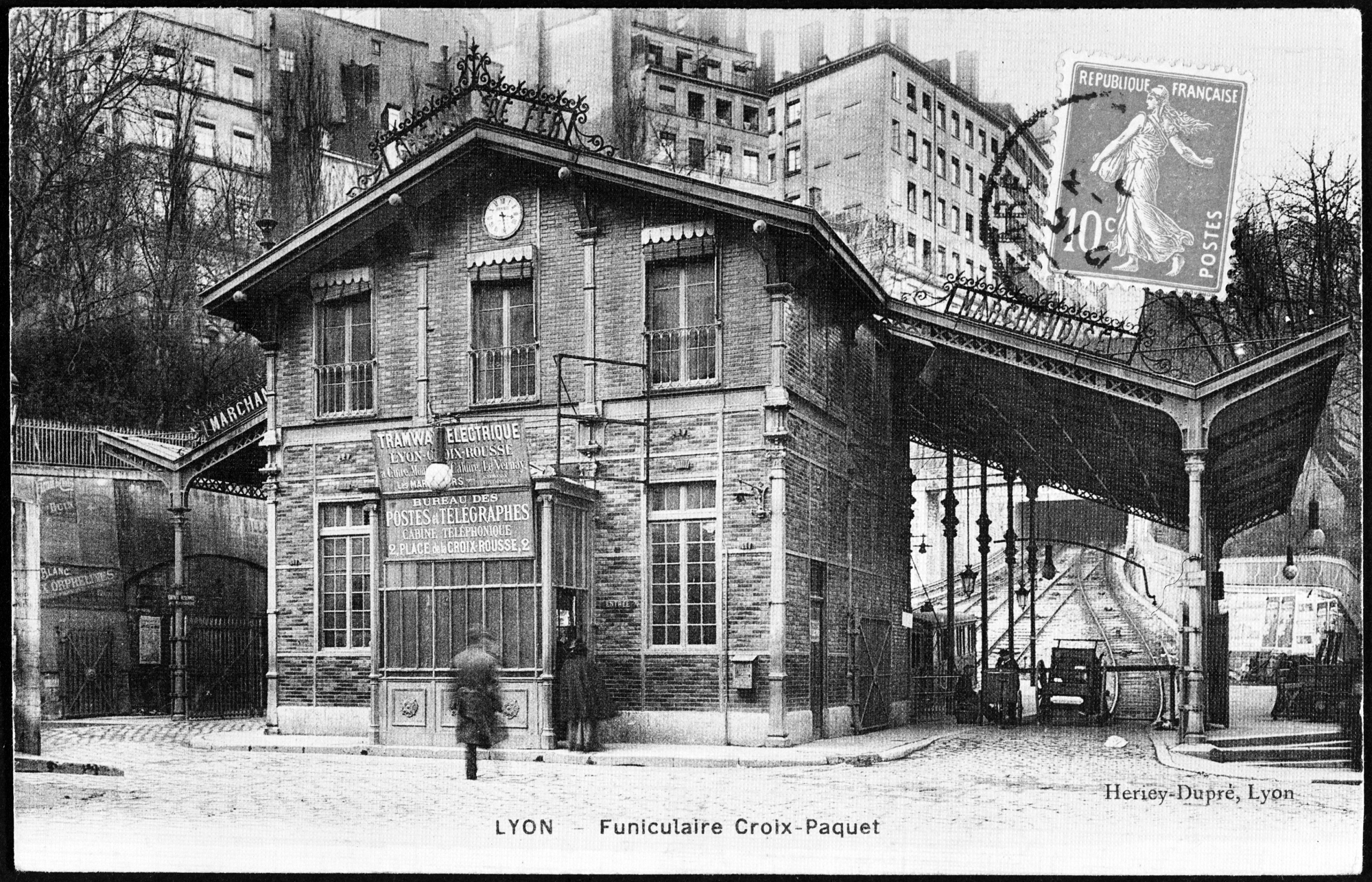
The funicular in 1910

The line now serves five stations, and is 2.4 kilometres (1.5 mi) long. It was constructed using various methods: the original route used by the former funicular line runs up a steep incline rising from a deep tunnel to an exposed trench, the newly built level segment at Croix-Rousse using cut-and-cover, and the latest section beyond Hénon running on the surface. Croix Paquet station claims to be the steepest metro station in the world, with an incline of 17%. The repurposed alignment of the original funicular from Croix-Paquet to Croix-Rousse is among the world's oldest structures currently used by metro trains, having first opened in 1891.

It is currently the only steel-wheeled line on the Lyon Metro, as well as the only steel-wheel metro line in France outside Paris, excluding sections of the Paris Metro that run beyond the Paris city limits. Until Paris Metro Line 15 opens, it will be the only metro line in France to use overhead wires instead of a third rail (although the Paris Métro lines initially built by the Nord-Sud Company (now lines 12 and 13) did originally use overhead before being taken over by the CMP (now RATP) and were converted to third rail power following the takeover).

== List of the stations ==
- Hôtel de Ville–Louis Pradel
- Croix-Paquet
- Croix-Rousse
- Hénon
- Cuire

Diagram of Line C

== Chronology ==
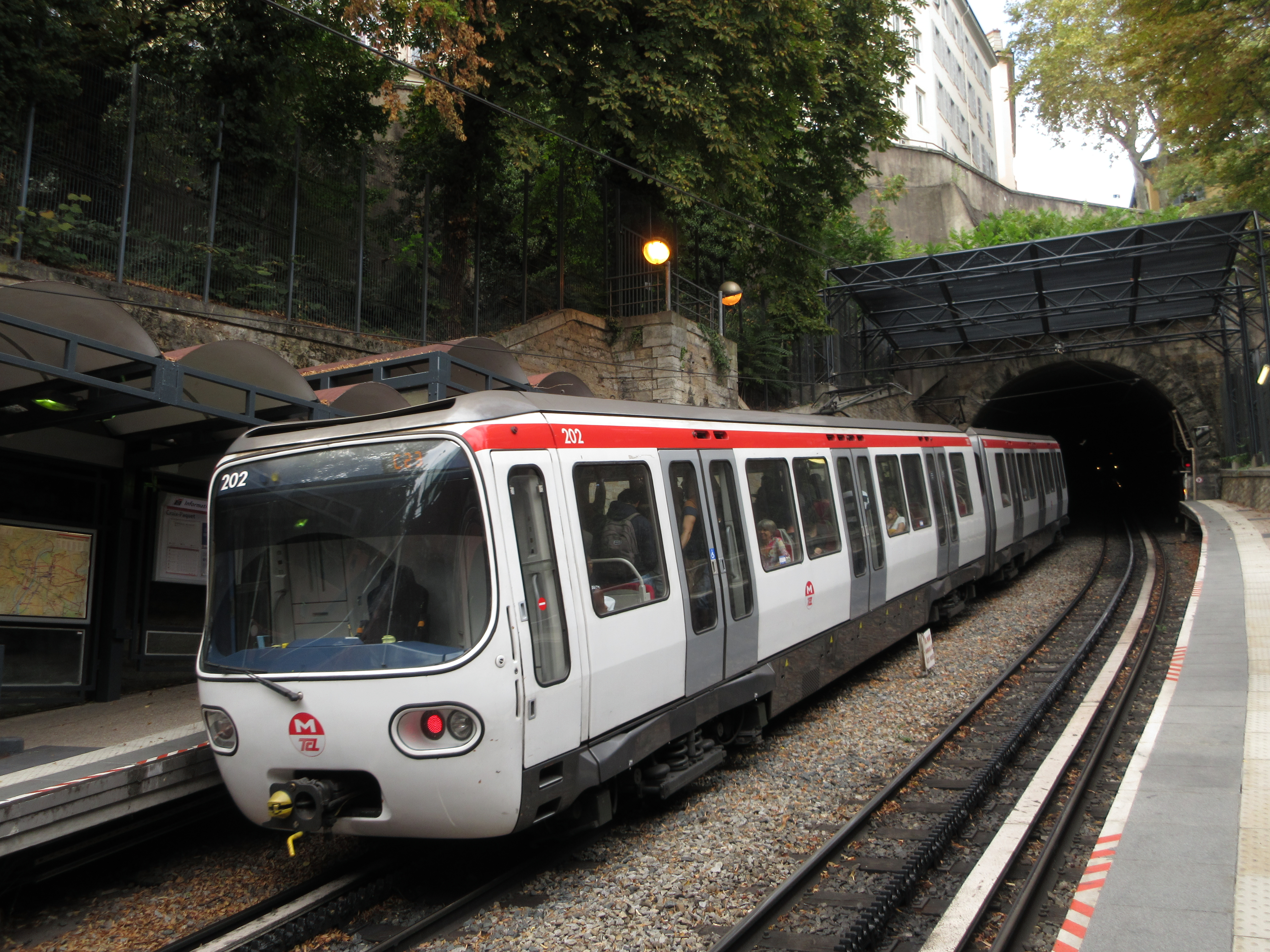
A rack-railway train of line C at the station Croix-Paquet.

- 9 December 1974: Croix-Paquet—Croix-Rousse
- 2 May 1978: Hôtel de Ville–Louis Pradel – Croix-Rousse
- 10 December 1984: Hôtel de Ville–Louis Pradel – Cuire
