= Parc de la Cerisaie =

Park in Lyon

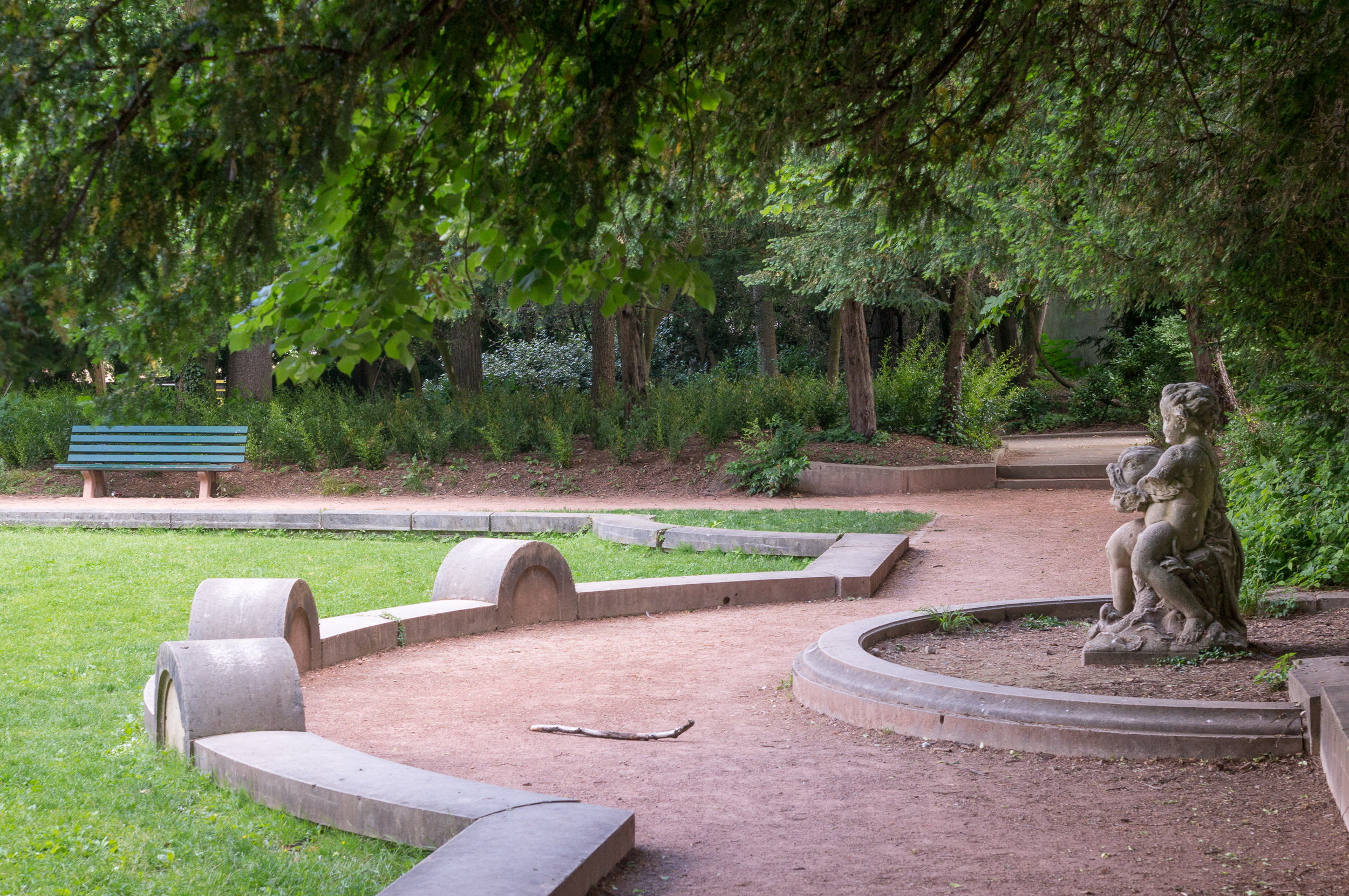
- Interactive map of Parc de la Cerisaie
- Type: Urban park
- Location: Lyon, 4th arrondissement
- Coordinates: 45.7761°N 4.814886°E
- Area: 11 acres (4.5 ha)
- Created: 1913
- Operator: City of Lyon
- Open: Winter: 8am - 7pm Summer: 8am - 10pm
- Website: Lyon City website's entry

The parc de la Cerisaie (French pronunciation: [paʁk də la səʁizɛ], Park of the Cherry Orchard) is an urban park in the Croix-Rousse 4th arrondissement of Lyon, France. It is partially situated on a slope, leading from the plateau of the Croix-Rousse down towards the river Saône.

== History ==
The park was constructed on a 19th-century property by the rich industrial Gillet family, on the land above their factories. The park was designed in 1913 and included about 1,200 trees. In the center of the park they had a large house built, known as Villa Gillet. The park and villa were sold to the city in 1973. Today the house is the base of operations of the Villa Gillet cultural institution, and the park is open to the public.

== Recreation ==
The park has children's playgrounds, lawns and benches, an exercise area and plenty of paved paths, making it a popular and important green space for people from the surrounding neighbourhoods.

== Sculptures ==
The park houses a sculpture trail, including works from César Baldaccini, Gérald Martinand, Jean-Pierre Raynaud, Geneviève Dumont, Gérard Michel, Markus Raetz, Bernard Pagès, Alain Lovato, Takis and Ulrich Rückriem.

== Vineyard ==
The République des Canuts association has a small vineyard in the park; 300 plants of gamay grape, planted in 1986. Pressed in Croix-Rousse, the wine produced is the Clos des Canuts.

== Gallery ==
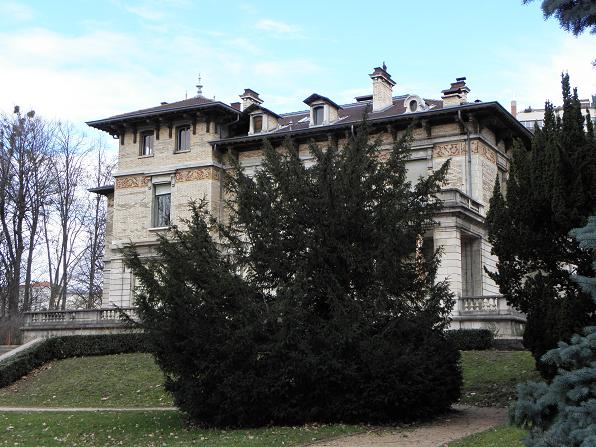
The Villa Gillet

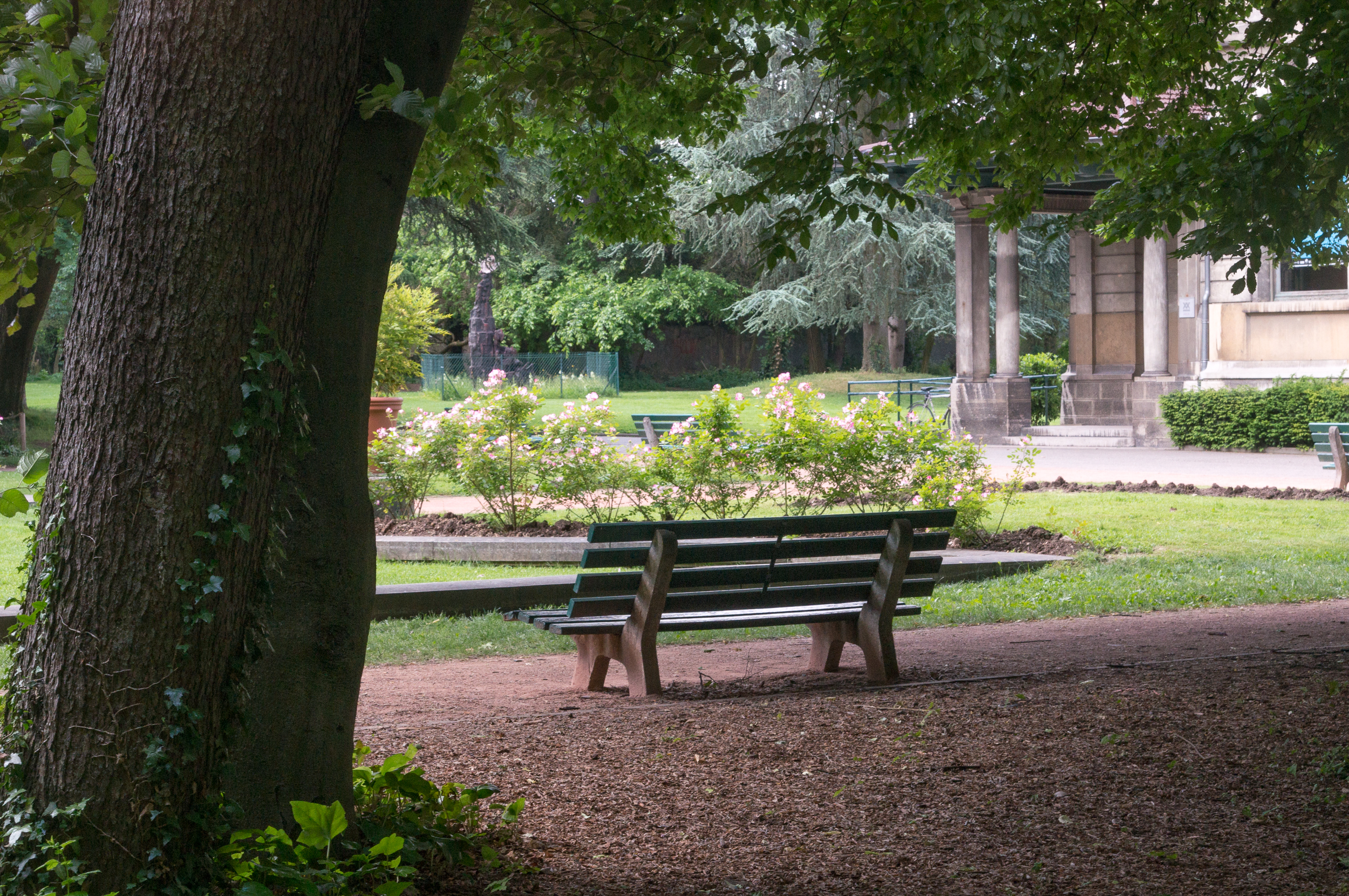
Mature trees and flowerbeds typical of the park

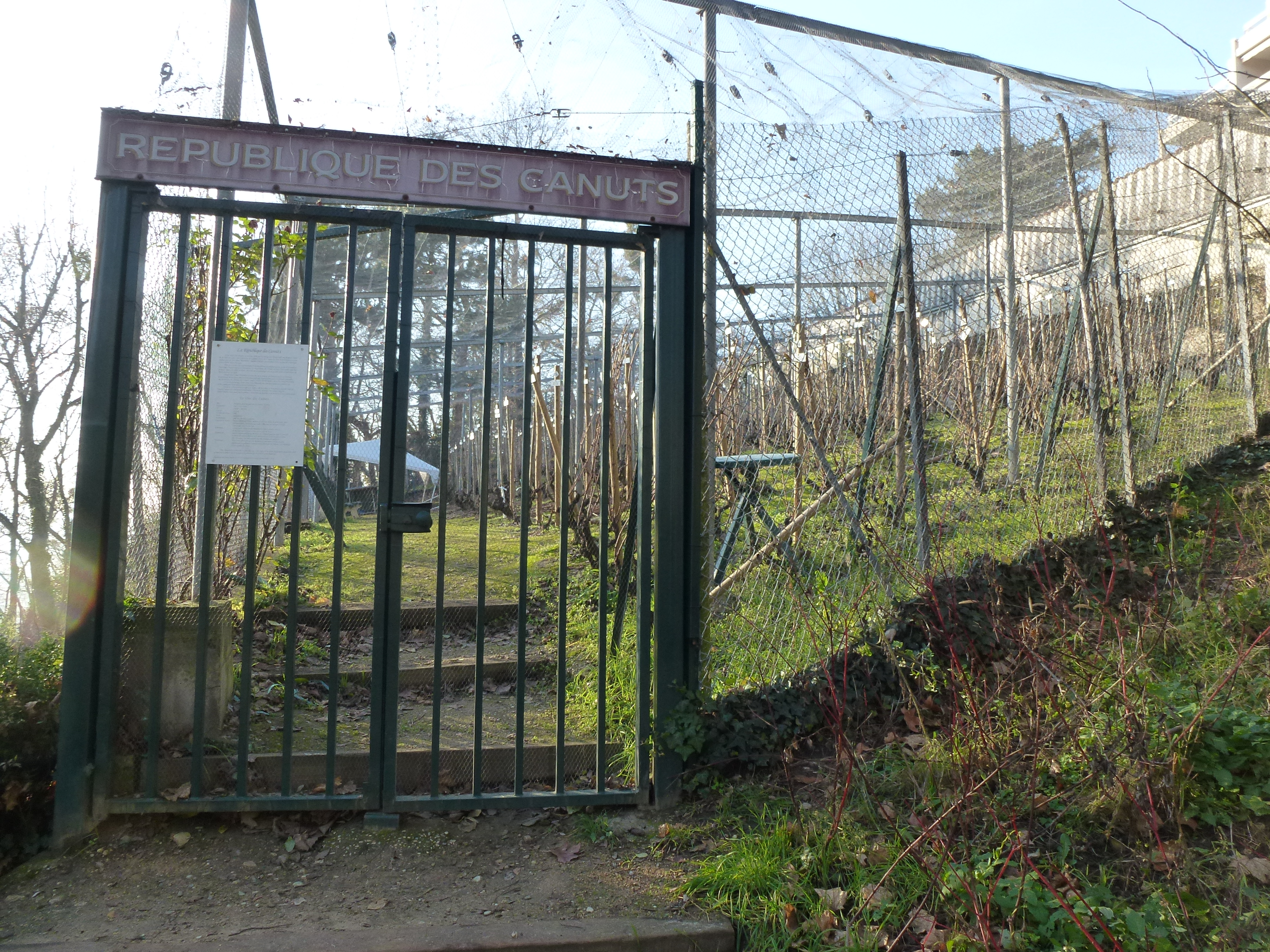
The vineyard, fenced off for security.

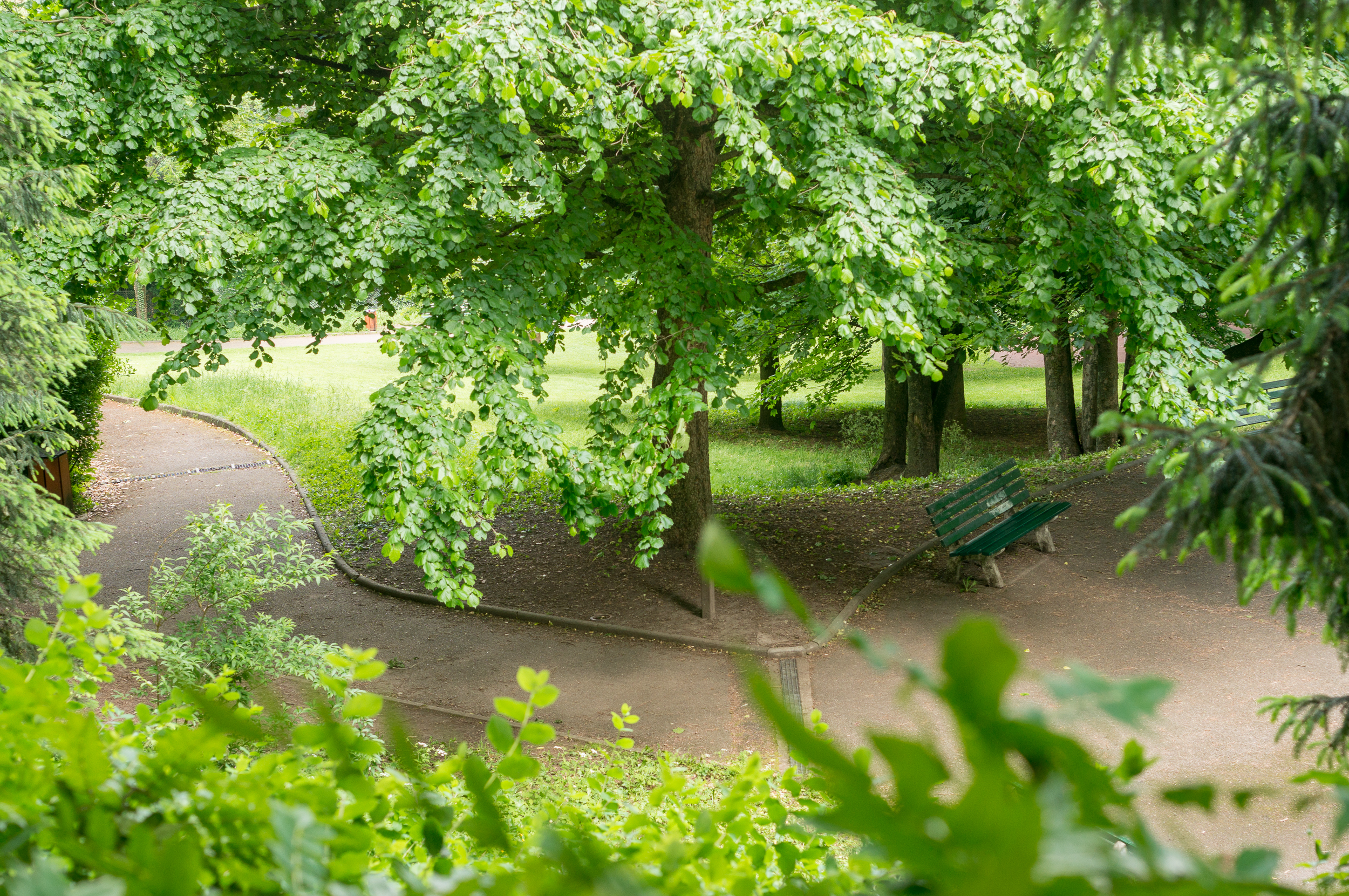
Path and park bench, under deciduous trees in spring.

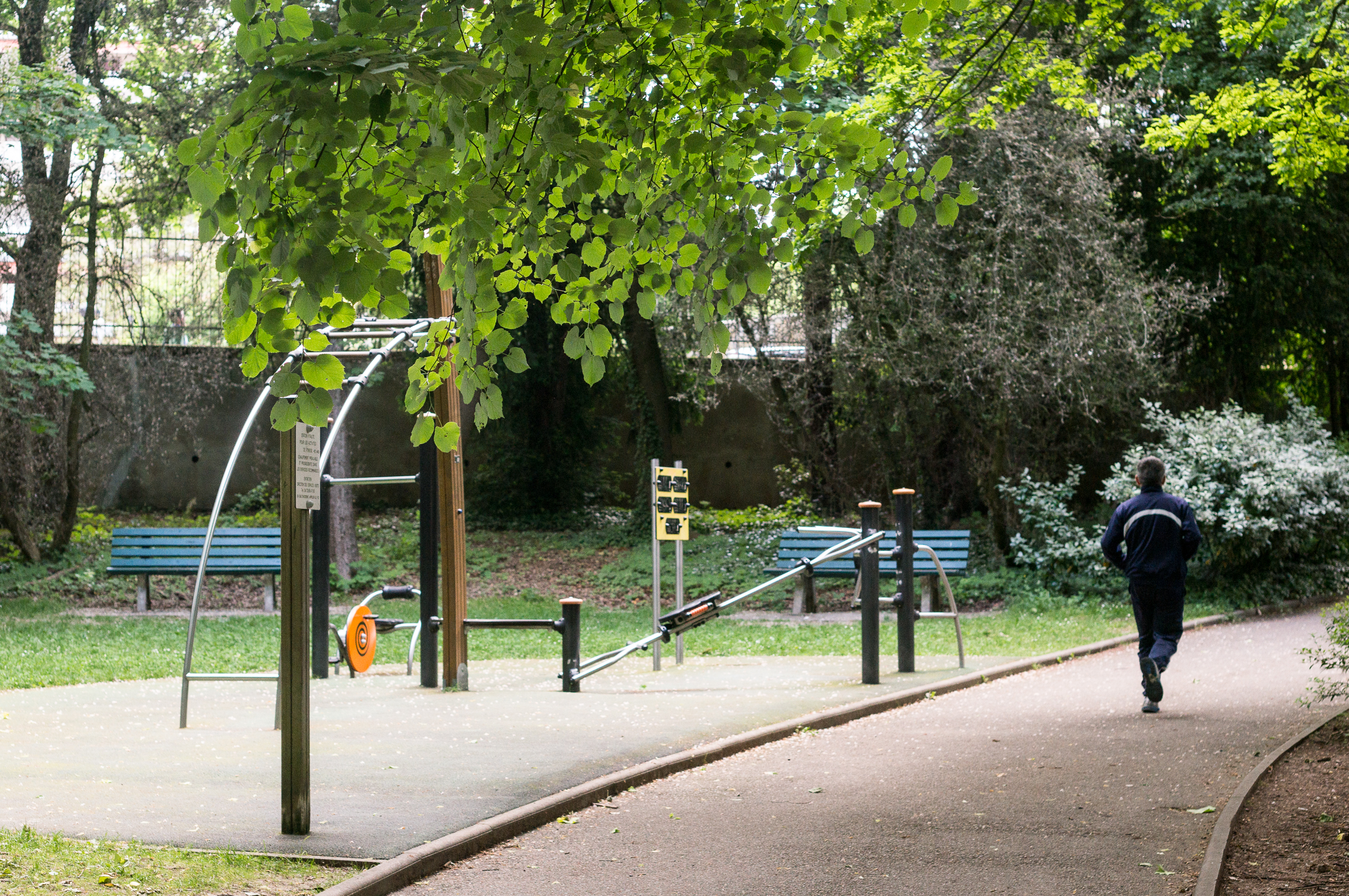
Exercise facilities in the park
