= Jardin Rosa Mir =

Garden in Lyon, France

Coordinates: 45.780516°N 4.832057°E

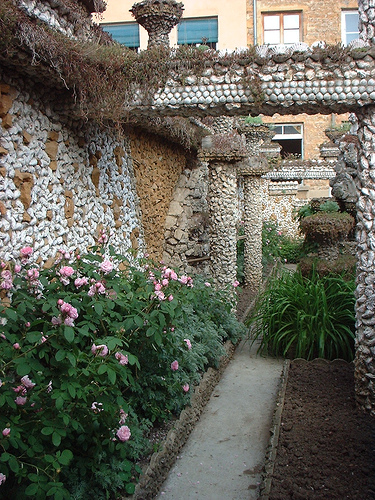
A path of the garden

The Jardin Rosa Mir (English: Rosa Mir Garden) is a garden located in the center of La Croix-Rousse quarter in the 4th arrondissement of Lyon, and created by Jules Senis. It is housed in a courtyard of the building at No. 83 Grande Rue de la Croix-Rousse. It can be accessed through a path located at No. 87 in the same street.

== History ==
This garden was created by Jules Senis (1913-1983), a tiler and bricklayer artisan, Spanish anarchist who had fled to France to escape the Spanish Civil War. He was diagnosed with cancer, but recovered after several years in hospital. During his illness, he had vowed to build a garden if he managed to leave the hospital, and thus created the garden Rosa Mir, to which he devoted the last twenty-five years of his life.

He dedicated this garden to his mother Rosa Mir Mercader.

== Description ==
Plants that compose this garden are mostly geraniums, ivy, lemon trees, prickly pear, roses, agaves and weeds. The garden is made of many columns topped with succulent plants, gantries and ties decorated with thousands of seashells (oysters, scallops), various kinds of stones, coral, desert roses, volcanic rocks and snails that cover all surfaces. At the center of the garden, there is a kind of fountain of about three meters high, covered with multicolored stones. On the left, an altar is dedicated to the Virgin Mary.

The garden has an area of 400 sqm. The decor is inspired by Spanish art, and seems to draw on the Antoni Gaudi's work in Barcelona (Park Guel or the Sagrada Família). The originality of this garden for visitors often evokes Ferdinand Cheval's work, although the garden is more of a mixture of floral structures and finely decorated combining minerals and plants.

An association was created around 1983 to prevent the garden from being destroyed. It was listed in the supplementary inventory of the monuments historiques in 1987 and has the label Patrimoine du XXe siècle (20th-century heritage), and has been the property of the City of Lyon since 1983. The garden is regularly frequented by visitors from around the world and has been mentioned in Japanese publications.

The journalist Pierrick Eberhard described the garden as a "kitsch masterpiece" which reflects "the extraordinary expertise in the service of the fixed idea of work".

The garden is open every Saturday from 2 p.m. to 6 p.m. from April to October.

== Photos ==
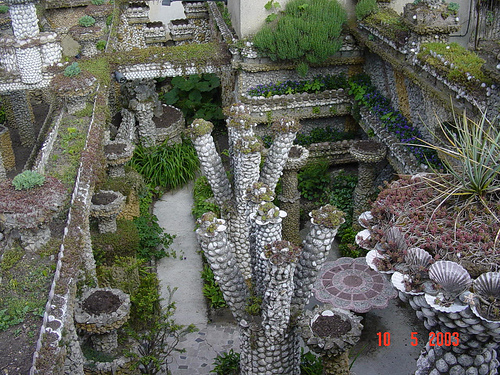
View of the garden from the stairs

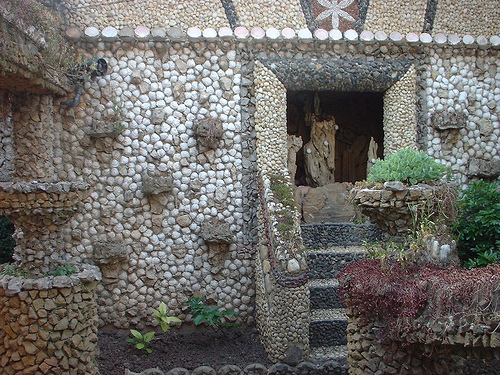
The niche with the altar devoted to the Virgin Mary

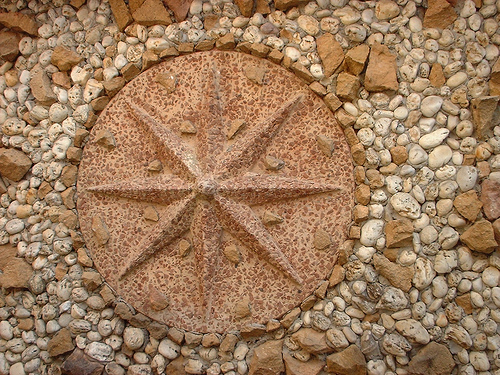
A desert rose

== See also ==
- 4th arrondissement of Lyon
- Visionary environments
