= Rue Dumenge =

Thoroughfare in Lyon, France

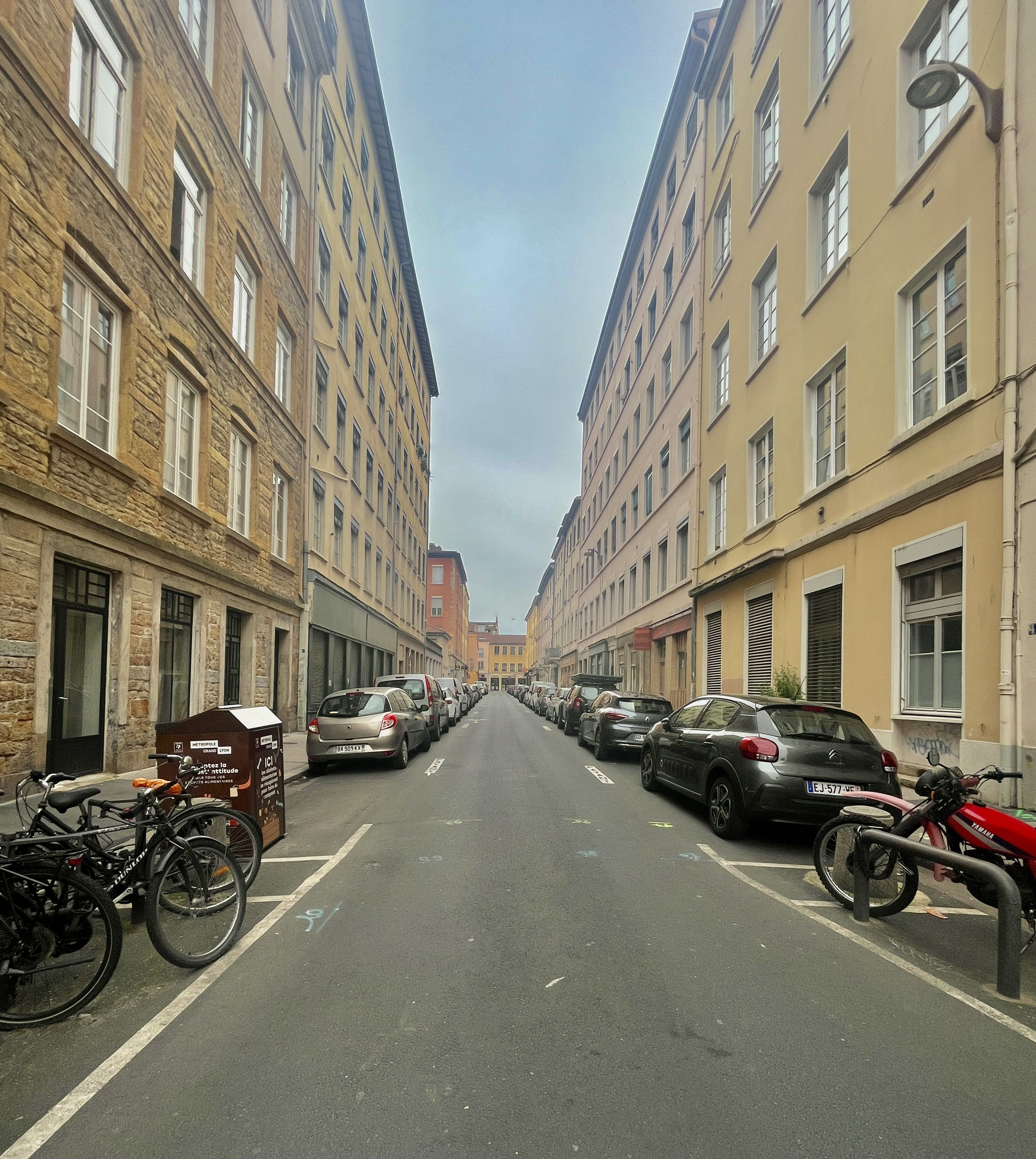
- April 2023
- Former name(s): Rue de l'Émancipation; Rue de la Démocratie
- Location: 4th arrondissement of Lyon, Lyon, France
- Postal code: 69004
- Coordinates: 45.776705°N 4.834467°E

Construction
- Construction start: 1812

The Rue Dumenge is a street located in the 4th arrondissement of Lyon, in the quarter of La Croix-Rousse. It begins on the Rue du Mail, crosses the Rue du Pavillon and the Rue de Belfort and ends on the Rue Dumont-d'Urville. The street is served by a metro station of the line C and a velo'v station.

== History ==
In the early nineteenth century, Pierre-Gabriel Dumenge owned some lands in La Croix-Rousse. He yielded to the city of Lyon some of them which were necessary to align the street. In 1812, on a two-acre field, he built an estate called Clos Dumenge, which provided building-workshops specially designed for weavers (the canuts). They are particularly bright and high in order to house the looms. Dumenge took the opportunity to give his name to one of the streets bordering the housing estate (see the municipal council of 21 September 1817). The Rue Sainte-Rose (called after the name of the daughter of the man who had opened the street) and the Rue Dumenge were renamed the Rue de l'Émancipation in 1849, then the Rue de la Démocratie in 1850, but both streets resumed their former name in 1851. Finally in 1891, the Rue Sainte-Rose was incorporated into the Rue Dumenge. As memory of the canut past of the street, a shuttle of weaving is represented on the gate at No. 10.

Adèle Bouvier, grandmother of French President Nicolas Sarkozy, was born at No. 2 rue Dumenge, on 5 March 1891.

== Architecture and associations ==
In the southern side, a beautiful stone archway can be seen, and after the Rue du Pavillon, a small one-story house and a workshop with balustrades, stairs and a glass roof. In the northern side, there is an alignment of three or four-floor facades of residential buildings, mainly canut-styled. The street ends with a set of small houses, and the corner of the Rue Dumont-d'Urville is adorned with a little man in its niche. There are few restaurants as well as workshops which house several associations about environment, including Greenpeace France (Lyon group), Ecologist magazine S!lence, the network Sortir du Nucleaire, Salon Primrose, and others.
