= Canut (surname) =

Surname of Catalan origin

Canut (Eastern Catalan: [kəˈnut]) is a Catalan surname. It is of religious lineage. Canut is one of the oldest surnames of Catalonia. The name was taken to pay tribute to King Canute IV of Denmark, a devout Catholic king. It can likewise be found around the immediate areas surrounding Catalonia.

Notable people with the surname include:

- Carles Canut (1944–2018), Spanish actor
- Joan Ribó i Canut (born 1947), Spanish politician and engineer
- Juan Canut de Bon (1846–1896), Spanish Protestant preacher
- Ludmilla Lacueva Canut (born 1971), Andorran writer
- Nacho Canut (born 1957), Spanish musician
