= MCL 80 =

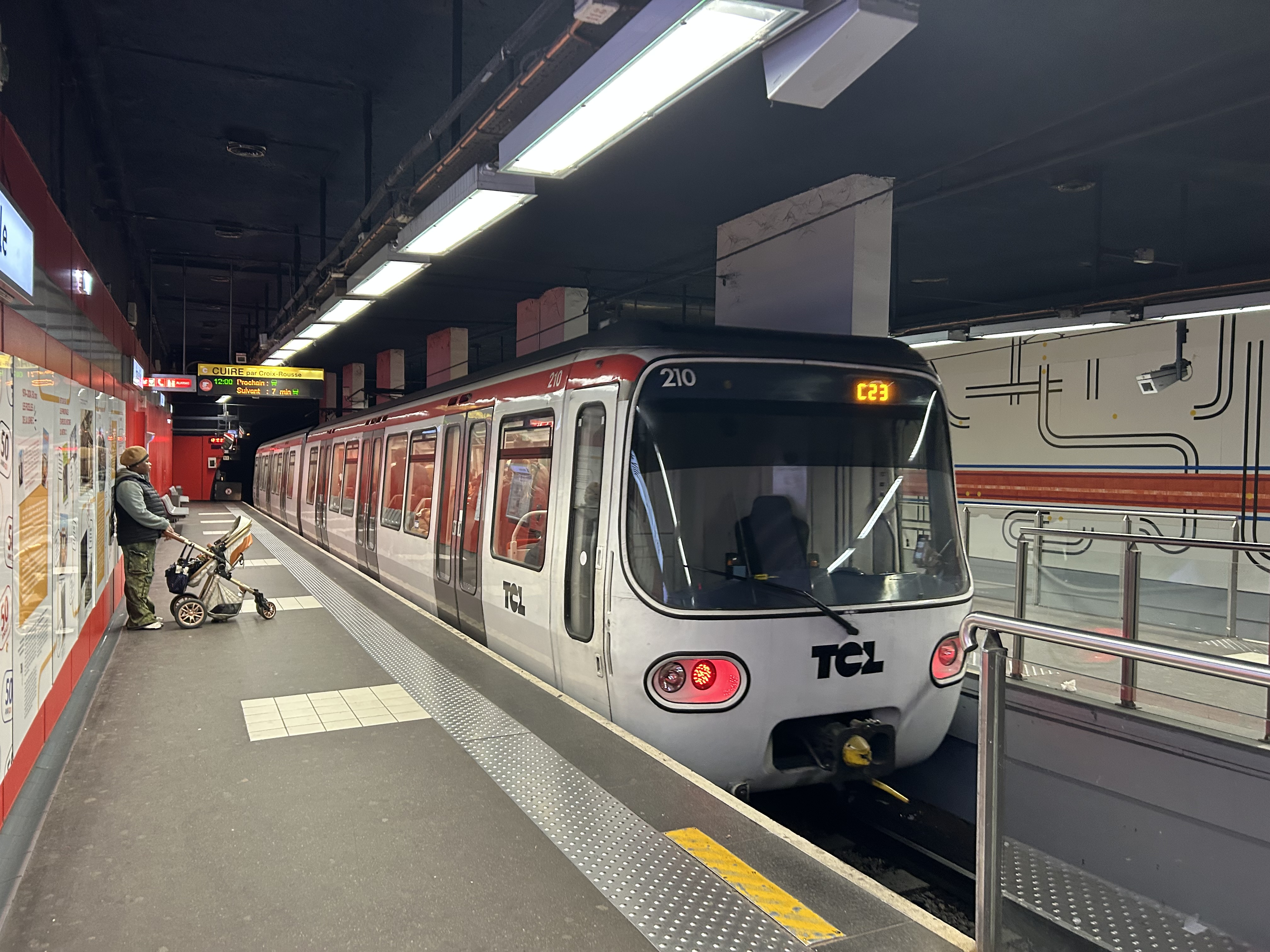
- In service: 1984–present
- Manufacturers: Alstom and SLM
- Constructed: 1979–1983
- Entered service: 1984
- Number built: 10 (5 units)
- Fleet numbers: 201–210
- Capacity: 100 seated; maximum 400
- Operator: Lyon Metro
- Line served: C

Specifications
- Train length: 36.66 m (120 ft 3 1/4 in)
- Car length: 18.33 m (60 ft 1 5/8 in)
- Width: 2.89 m (9 ft 5 3/4 in)
- Height: 3.58 m (11 ft 9 in)
- Floor height: 1.1 m (3 ft 7 1/4 in)
- Wheel diameter: 690 mm (27 in)
- Wheelbase: 2.62 m (8 ft 7 in)
- Maximum speed: 80 km/h (50 mph)
- Traction system: Chopper control
- Traction motors: 4 × 217 kW (291 hp) DC motor
- Power output: 868 kW (1,164 hp)
- Electric systems: 750 V DC overhead catenary
- Current collection: Pantograph
- UIC classification: (A1)(A1)+(1A)(1A)
- Track gauge: 1,435 mm (4 ft 8 1/2 in) standard gauge

The MCL 80 (Métro Crémaillère Lyon 1980) is the Electric Multiple Unit type used on the Lyon Metro's Line C. All five trains were built by Alstom (then Alsthom) and Swiss Locomotive and Machine Works (SLM) and were delivered and entered service in 1984. This train model is the only model of the Lyon Metro using steel wheels, rather than rubber tyres.
