= TCL (public transport) =

Public transport network in Lyon, France

Transports en commun lyonnais

Overview
- Owner: SYTRAL Mobilités (in French)
- Locale: Metropolis of Lyon; Communauté de communes de l'Est lyonnais (Community of communes of east Lyon); 7 other communes in Rhône department
- Transit type: Metro; Funicular; Tramway; Bus and trolleybus
- Number of lines: 4 métro lines; 2 funicular lines; 7 tramway lines; 24 high-frequency bus and trolleybus lines; Over 100 other bus and trolleybus lines
- Annual ridership: 496.213 millions (2019)
- Headquarters: Boulevard Marius-Vivier-Merle; Lyon (3rd arrondissement)
- Website: tcl.fr

Operation
- Began operation: 21 June 1879: Creation of the OTL (Compagnie des Omnibus et Tramways de Lyon); 1 January 1967: Creation of TCL, replacing the OTL
- Operator(s): Keolis; RATP

TCL, before 1 September 2025 known as Transports en commun lyonnais (French pronunciation: [tʁɑ̃spɔʁ ɑ̃ kɔmœ̃ ljɔnɛ]; 'Lyon public transport'), is the public transport network in the Metropolis of Lyon, administered by the SYTRAL Mobilités authority. It is the second largest public transport network in France (after Paris), and covers 72 communes, including all 58 communes of the Metropolis of Lyon, spread over 746 square kilometres (288 sq mi).

TCL is managed by SYTRAL Mobilités that sets policies and finances the infrastructure.

Systral Mobilities awarded RATP an operational contract for all rail based services succeeding Keolis effective 1 January 2025. Keolis retained the contract to operate buses and trolleybuses.

== Network ==
=== Lines ===
TCL manages:

- 4 metro lines
- 2 funiculars
- 7 tramway lines (The Rhônexpress tram-train line is not run by TCL)
- 24 high-frequency bus lines, including electric trolleybuses
- Over 100 other bus lines, including electric trolleybuses
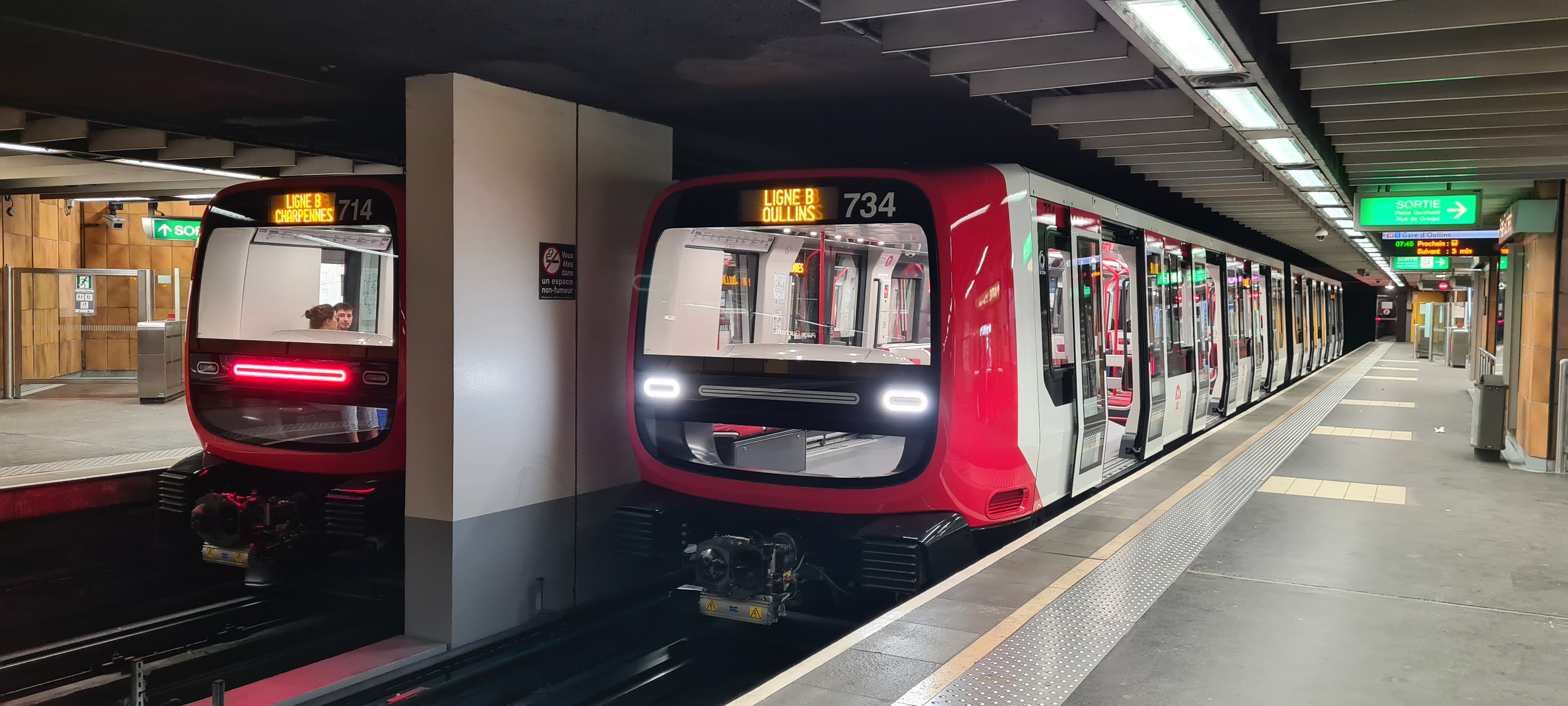
Métro
(at Place Guichard–Bourse du Travail station, line B)

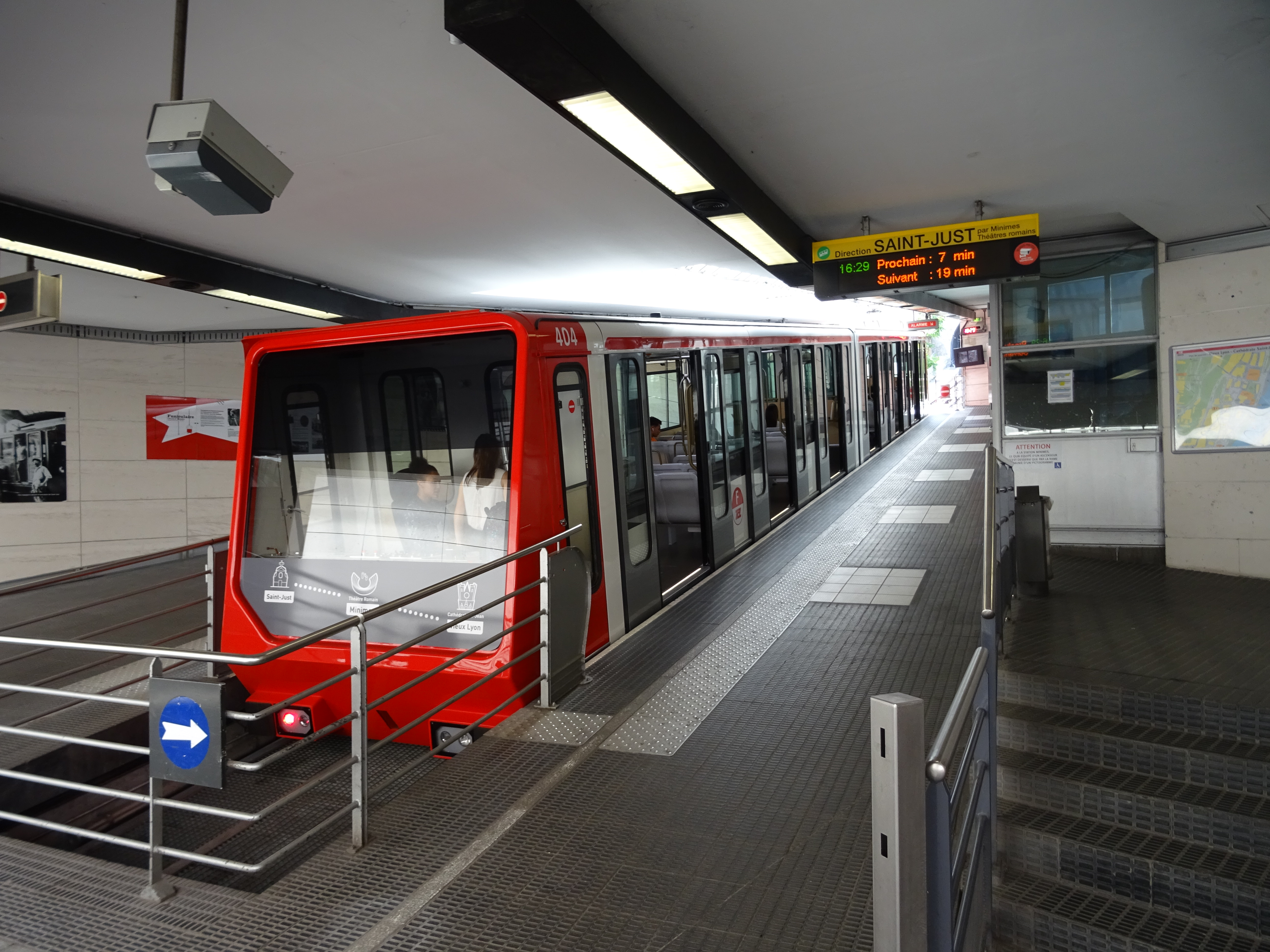
Funicular
(at Vieux Lyon–Cathédrale Saint-Jean station, line F1)

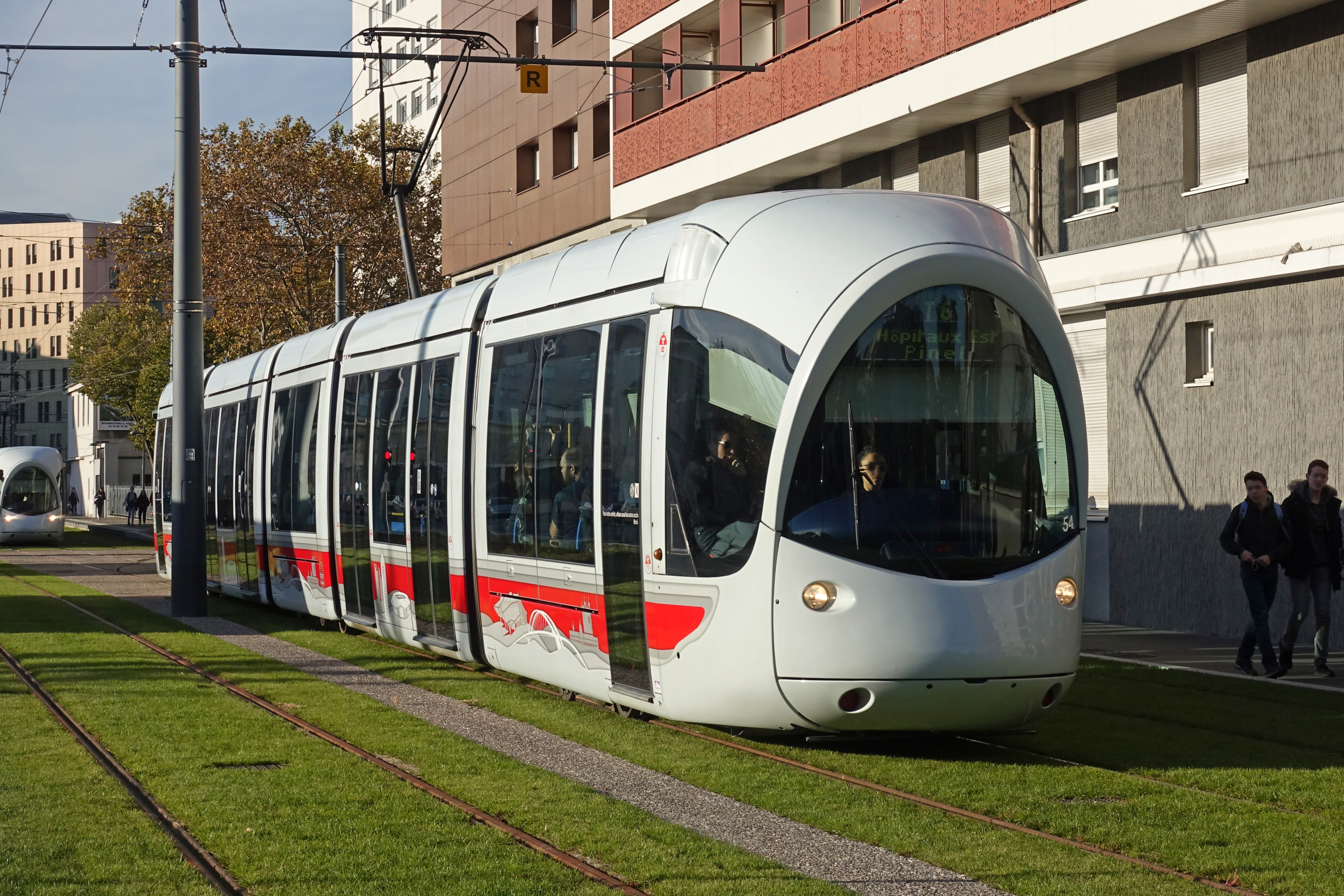
Tramway
(near Debourg station, line T6)

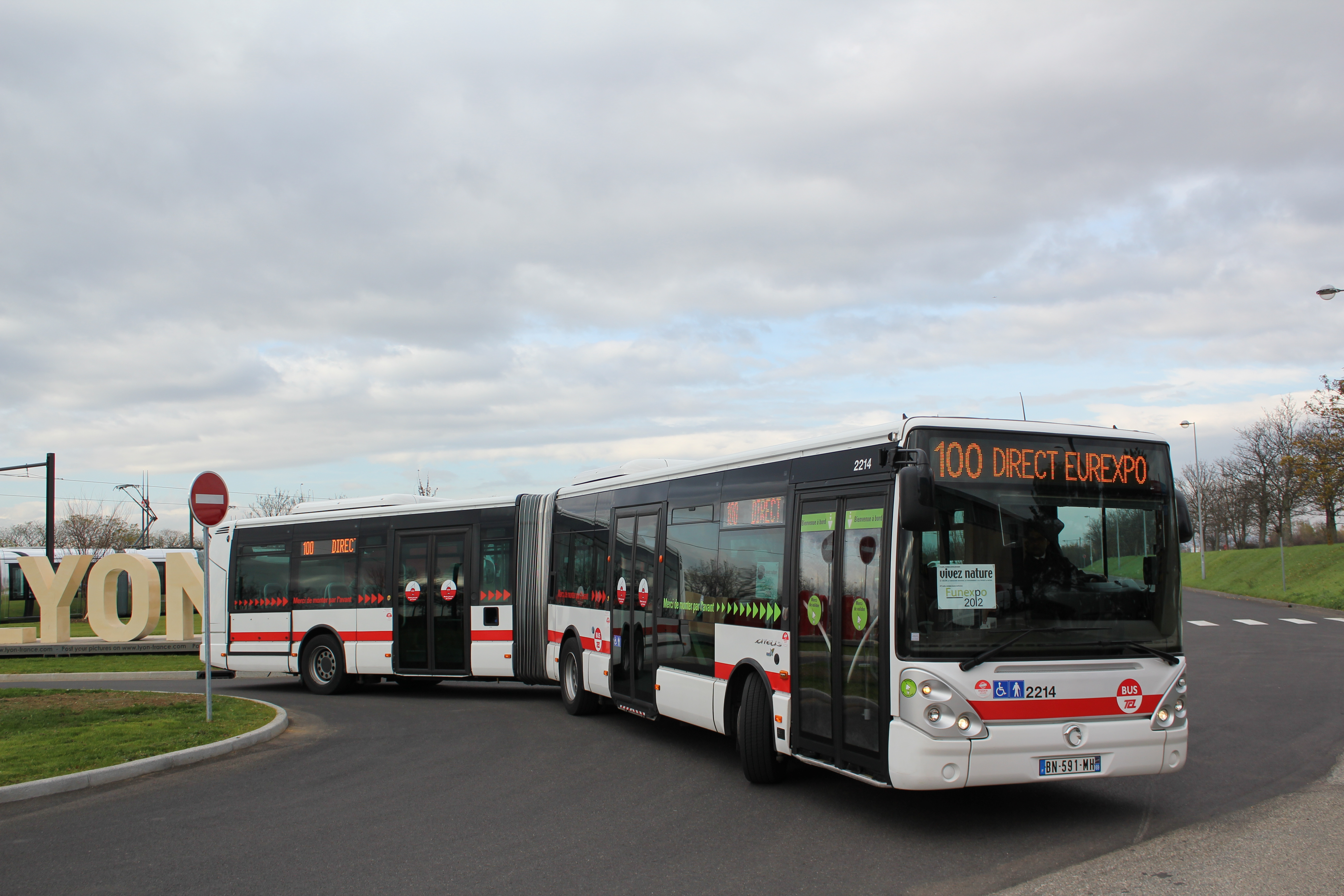
Bus
(near Eurexpo, line N100)

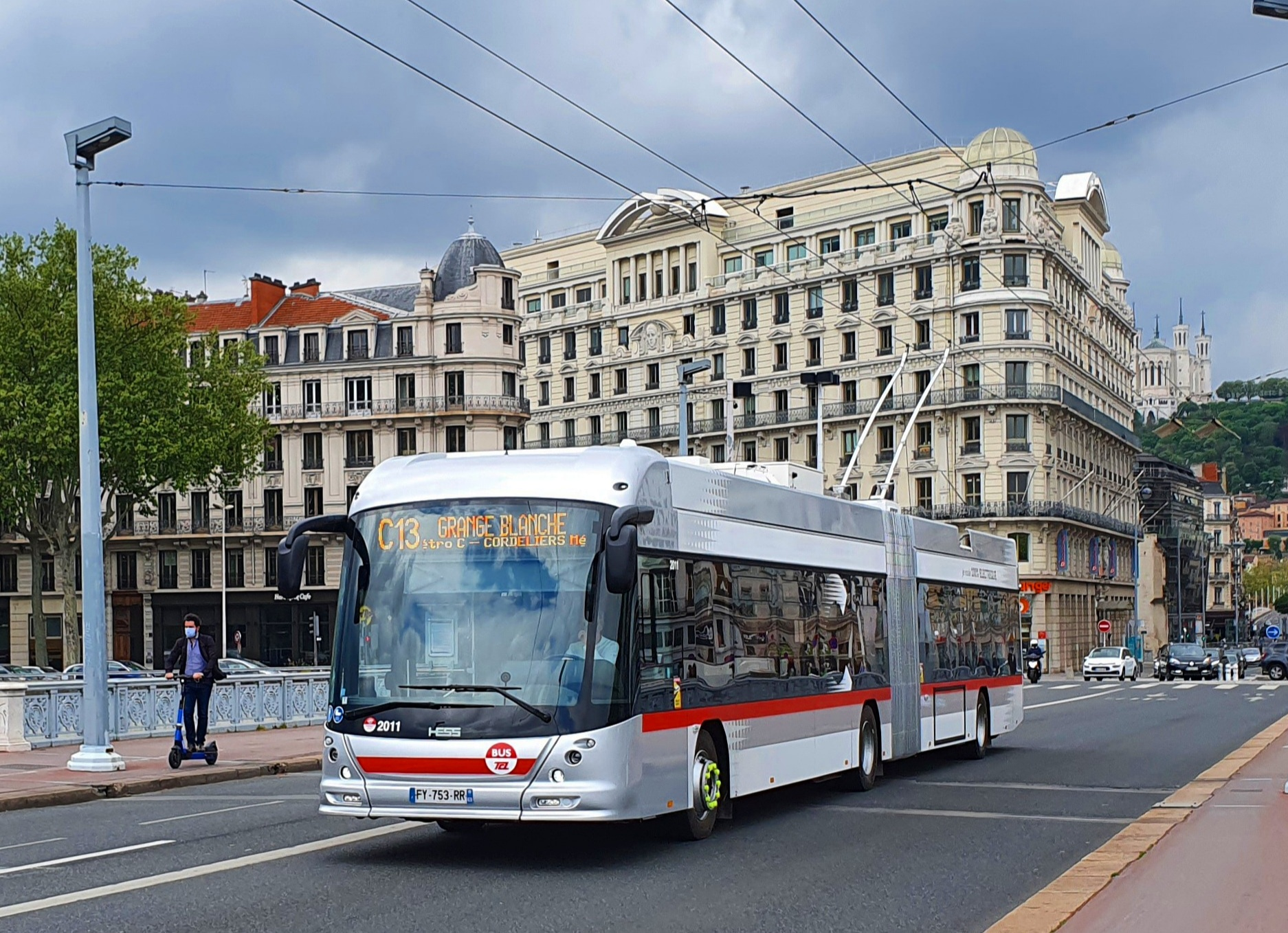
Trolleybus
(on the Lafayette Bridge, line C13)

=== Major stations ===
The TCL network is built around several big stations connecting metro and tram lines:

- Bellecour is set in the very centre of the city and has many connections with other stations.
- Hôtel de Ville–Louis Pradel
- Charpennes–Charles Hernu is the crossroad of several metro and tram lines to every direction (north, east, south, west).
- Saxe–Gambetta
- Gare Part-Dieu–Vivier Merle is in La Part-Dieu business district and serves Part-Dieu railway station, the most important railway station in Lyon.
- Perrache is a major TCL station served by metro, tramway and bus lines located inside Perrache Multimodal Hub, a large transport dedicated building that also houses Perrache coach station, served by regional, national and international coach services. By a short footbridge, pedestrians can directly walk from the multimodal hub to Perrache railway station, the second most important railway station in Lyon.
- Vaulx-en-Velin–La Soie

Some other major stations are connecting suburban bus lines to metro or tram lines, and sometimes railway stations:

- Gare de Vaise–Gérard Collomb (Vaise railway station)
- Gare de Vénissieux (Vénissieux railway station)
- Gare d'Oullins (Oullins railway station)
- Gorge de Loup (Gorge de Loup railway station)
- Laurent Bonnevay–Astroballe

=== Night service ===
Several bus lines run one bus per hour throughout the night, mostly to allow young people to get home. Since September 2021 there have been three such lines, labelled "Pleine Lune" ("full moon") (fr). A fourth line, Pleine Lune 4, was discontinued in March 2020.

- Pleine Lune 1 (PL1): Terreaux – La Feuillée → Cordeliers → Part-Dieu–Jules Favre → Charpennes–Charles Hernu → INSA – Einstein → Cité Internationale
- Pleine Lune 2 (PL2): Hôtel de Ville → Bellecour–Antonin Poncet → Saxe–Gambetta → Bachut–Mairie du 8ème → Grange Blanche
- Pleine Lune 3 (PL3): Hôtel de Ville → Saint-Irénée → Valmy → Écully Centre → Campus Lyon Ouest

== Fares ==
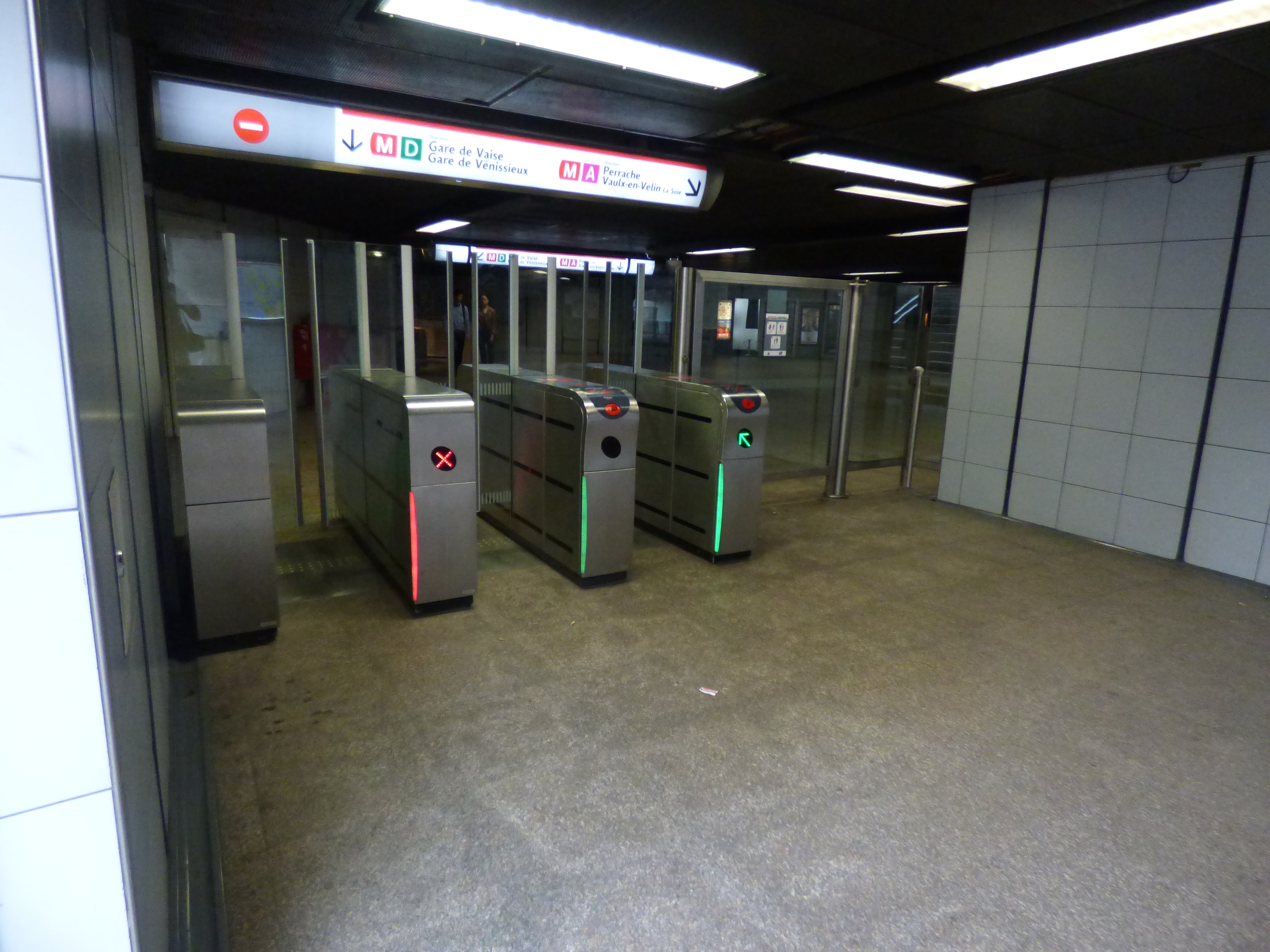
Ticket barriers at an entrance of Bellecour metro station

The TCL network has a fare system composed of paper tickets and a contactless smartcard named Técély.

Tickets or the Técély card need to be validated at ticket barriers when entering a metro or funicular station, or at ticket validators located on board of trams, buses and trolleybuses. Validation of ticket or Técély card is mandatory at each connection, except for connections between metro or funicular lines.

=== Tickets ===
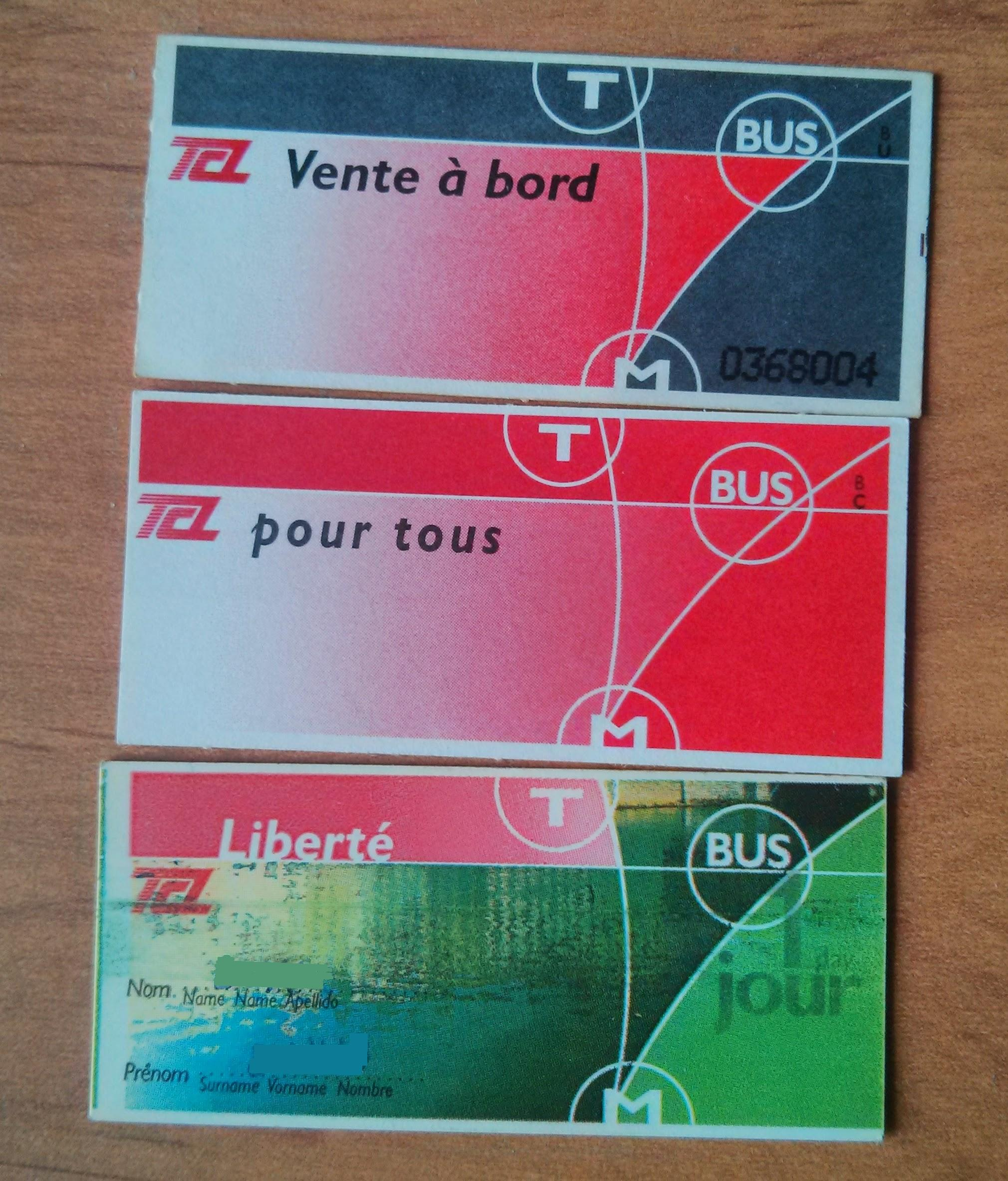
Some types of TCL tickets

There are multiple types of tickets, with different validity durations. There are also different tarifications regarding the age of the passenger.

The most basic ticket is the "1-hour ticket", it can be validated unlimitedly during 1 hour starting from the first validation. It costs €1.90, and it can also be purchased in booklets of 10 tickets at €18 (€1.80 each ticket). This ticket is red.

A "1-hour ticket" at a reduced price is available for people under 26 years old and students under 28 years old, it is sold only by booklets of 10 tickets at €15.40 (€1.54 each ticket). This ticket is yellow.

Another version of the "1-hour ticket" is sold by bus and trolleybus drivers, this one costs €2.20. It is more expensive than a usual ticket in order to encourage people to buy tickets at vending machines or other sales points. This ticket is grey.

There are also long duration tickets valid during 2, 24, 48 or 72 hours starting from the first validation. These tickets are green.

=== Técély card ===
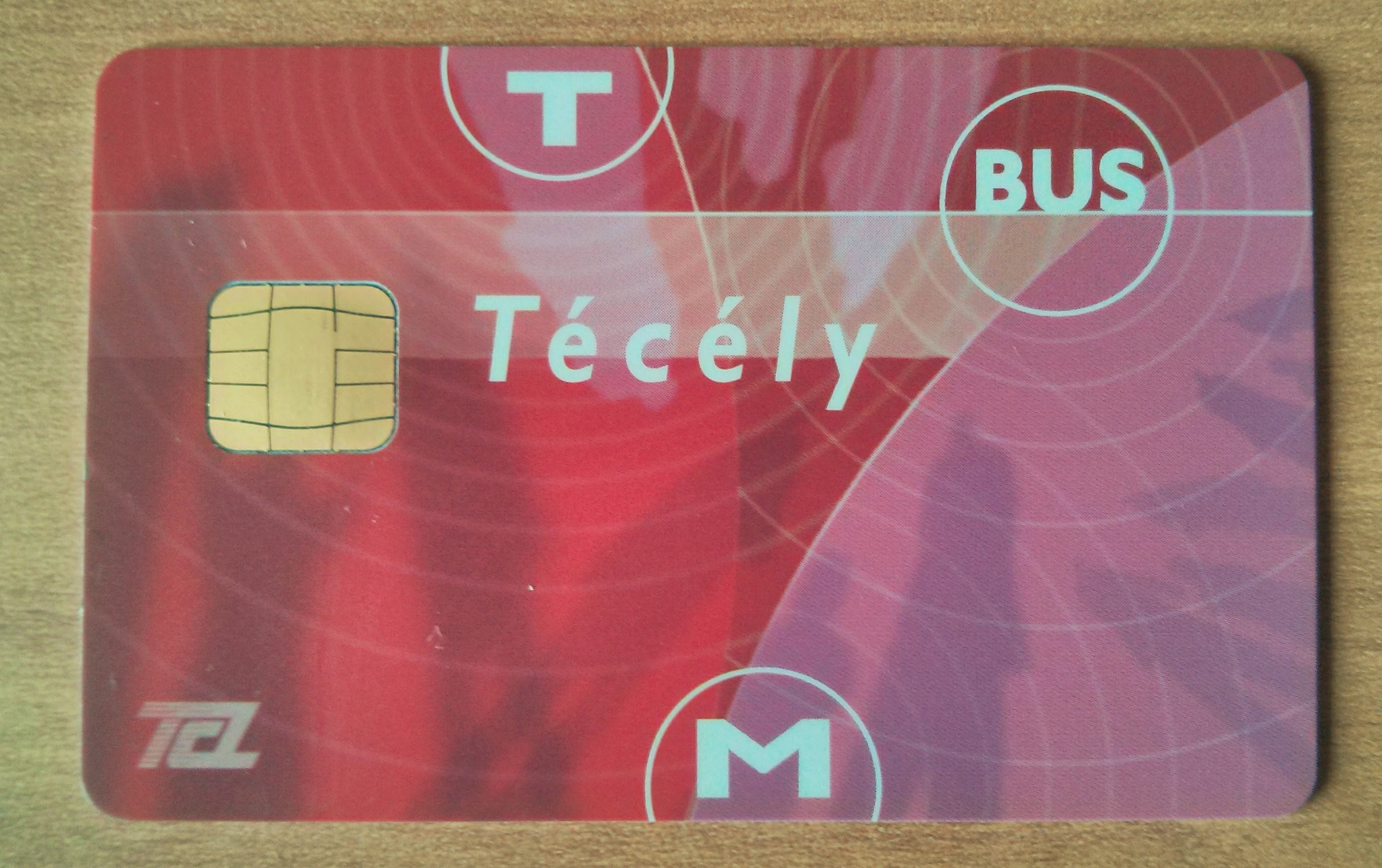
Técély card

Introduced on 1 July 2002, the Técély card (Carte Técély) is the contactless smartcard of the TCL network. The card itself costs €5 and is usable during five years, it can be obtained in the five TCL agencies or by mail order.

To be valid, the Técély card needs to be recharged with a weekly, monthly or annual pass.

Booklets of 10 "1-hour tickets" can also be recharged on the Técély card, at normal or reduced price, depending on the age or status of the card holder. Up to 40 tickets can be contained at a time on a Técély card.

Tickets recharged on the card will be debited at validation only if no weekly, monthly or annual pass is recharged on the card. If there is a pass and tickets recharged at the same time on the card, no ticket will be debited at validation.

=== Sales points ===
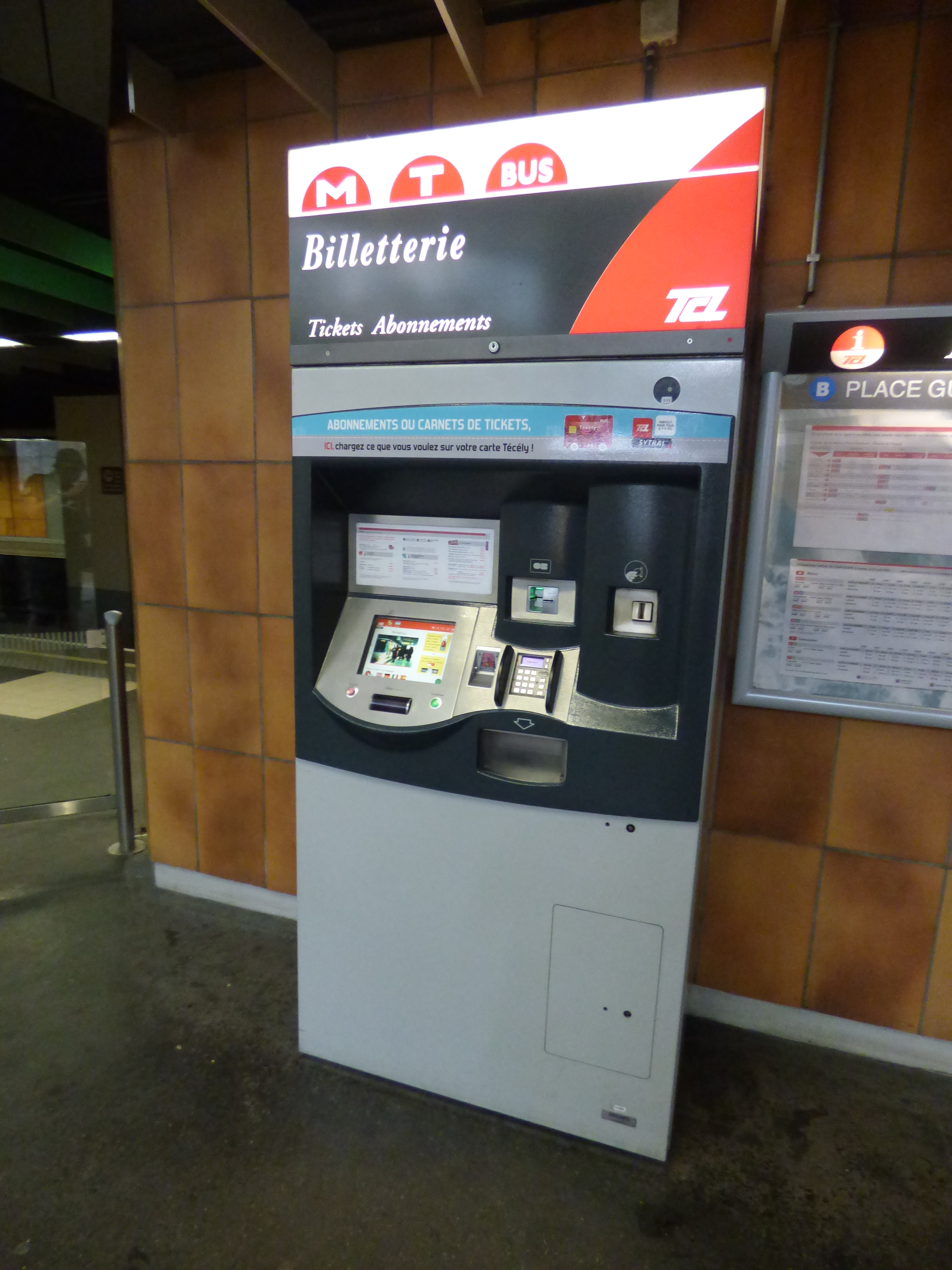
A ticket vending machine at Place Guichard–Bourse du Travail metro station

Buying tickets and recharging Técély cards is possible at different types of sales points:

- 5 TCL agencies (Agence TCL) are located at major stations (Bellecour, Grange Blanche, Gorge de Loup, Part-Dieu, La Soie). This is the only place to get a new Técély card.
  - Proposed services: Buy tickets, recharge the Técély card with "1-hour tickets", recharge the Técély card with a weekly/monthly/annual pass, recharge the Técély card with a monthly pass subscription, get a new Técély card.
- 477 ticket vending machines are available across all metro, funicular and tram stations, and at some stations of trolleybus lines C1, C2 and C3.
  - Proposed services: Buy tickets, recharge the Técély card with "1-hour tickets", recharge the Técély card with weekly/monthly/annual pass.
- 220 TCL service points (Point service TCL) are located in TCL's partners shops.
  - Proposed services: Buy tickets, recharge the Técély card with "1-hour tickets", recharge the Técély card with a monthly/annual pass.
- More than 100 ATMs of CIC and Crédit Mutuel banks propose to recharge Técély cards, even with a payment card from another bank.
  - Proposed services: Recharge the Técély card with "1-hour tickets", recharge the Técély card with a monthly/annual pass.

== See also ==
- Lyon Metro
- Funiculars of Lyon
- Lyon tramway
- Rhônexpress
- Buses in Lyon
- Trolleybuses in Lyon
- Réseau Express de l'Aire métropolitaine lyonnaise
