= Buses in Lyon =

Bus network

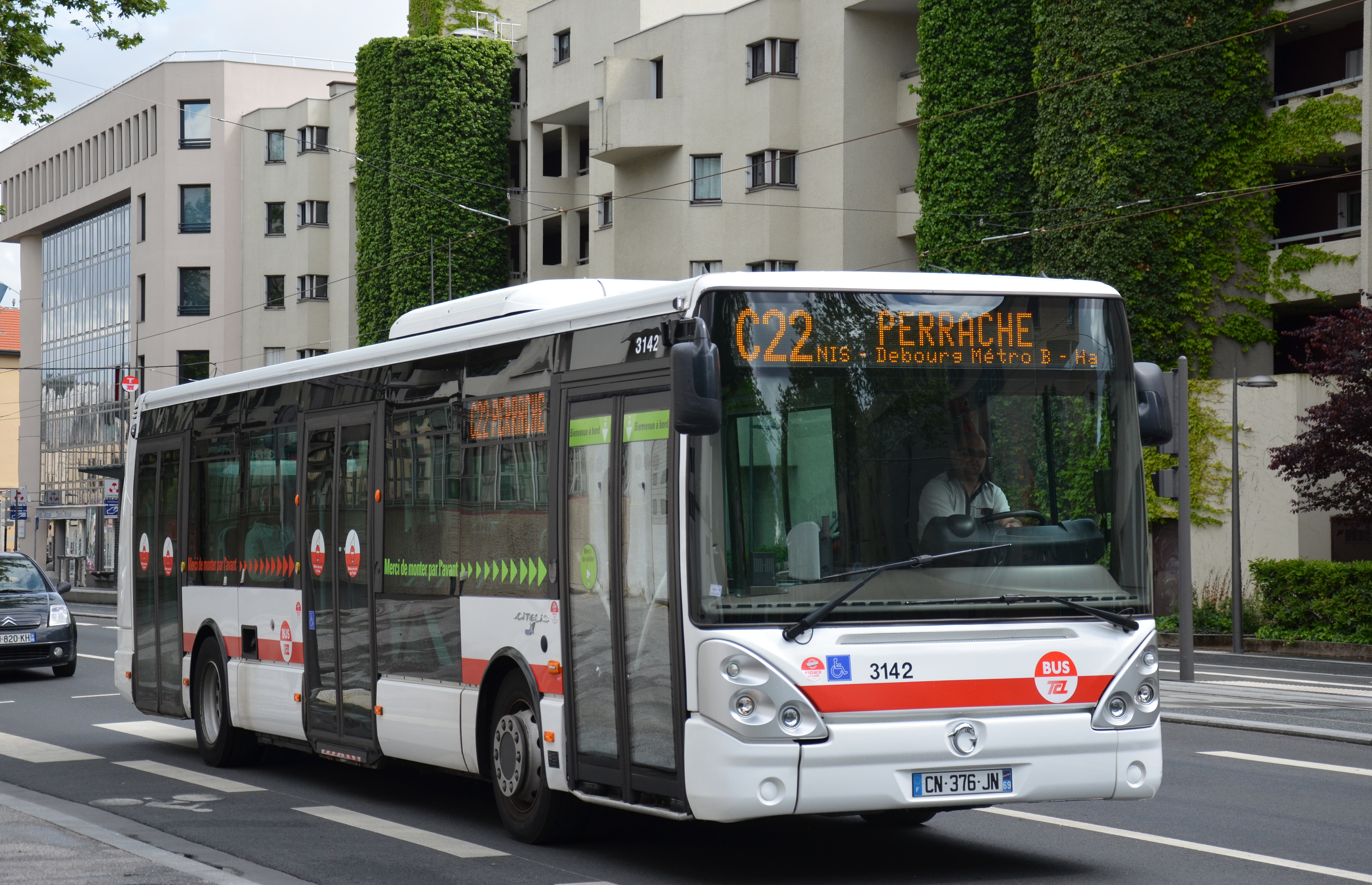
Line C22 of buses in Lyon

The Lyon surface bus network is operated by Keolis on behalf of SYTRAL for TCL. It includes over 140 lines of buses and trolleybuses spread out through Lyon and the greater Grand Lyon area. Four nocturnal lines (Pleine Lune) operate from 1:00 am to 4:00 am from Thursday to Saturday during university periods. Only urban and departmental lines owned by TCL are listed here. Most vehicles belong to Irisbus brand (e.g. Renault Véhicules Industriels). Since January 2007, all lines of the surface network (except C1, C2 and C3 lines) have been used by "MPA" (Montée Porte Avant). The return to this mode of operation took place gradually in the second half of 2006. On 1 January 2007, the former network Gibus of Givors was integrated into the TCL network as Line 80, 81, 82 and R3.
