= Canut =

Lyonnais silk workers

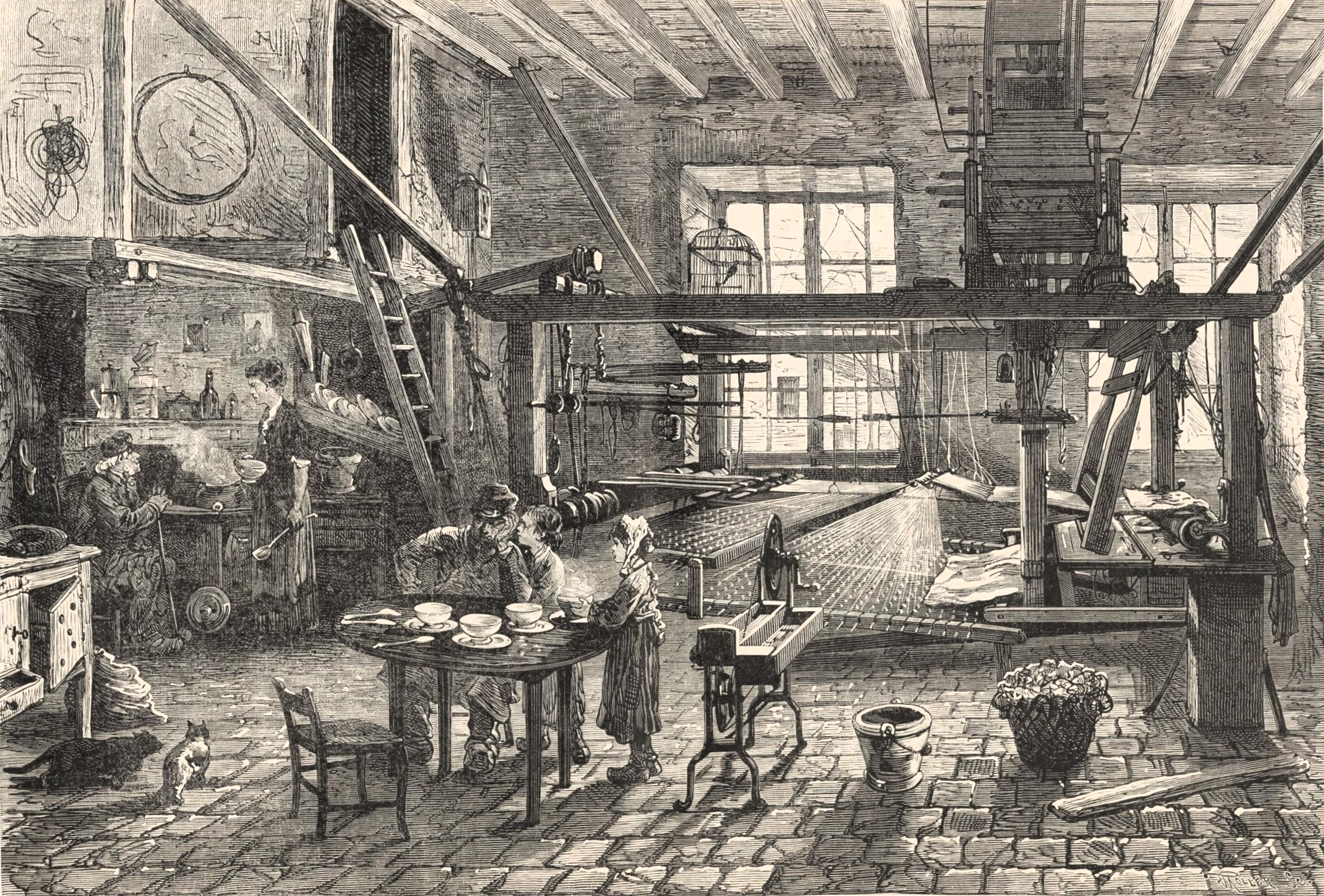
The interior of a canut's home. Engraving by Moller, 1860.

The canuts (French: [kany]) were Lyonnais silk workers, often working on Jacquard looms. They were primarily found in the Croix-Rousse neighbourhood of Lyon in the 19th century. Although the term generally refers to Lyonnais silk workers, silk workers in the nearby commune of l'Arbresle are also called canuts.

== Etymology ==
The word canut may come from an abbreviation of the French expression "Voici les cannes nues!" (Look at those bare canes!), as canes without any charms or ribbons were considered a sign of poverty. It may equally well come from the word canette (spool) referring to the spool on which the silk was kept prior to being used.

== History ==
The canuts were Lyonnais silk workers in the 19th century, often working on Jacquard looms primarily in the Croix-Rousse neighbourhood.

The canuts were subject to extremely poor working conditions. On account of these conditions, they staged many worker uprisings, known as the Canut revolts. The first revolt, in October 1831 is considered to be one of the first worker uprisings. The canuts occupied Lyon, shouting "Vivre libre en travaillant ou mourir en combattant!" (Live free working or die fighting!) King Louis-Philippe sent 20,000 soldiers and 150 cannons to suppress the "riot". On February 14, 1834, the canuts revolted a second time, occupying the heights of Lyon. The revolt lasted 6 days before being suppressed by 12,000 soldiers. According to historian Gérard Cholvy, the revolts had a profound effect on the French scholar Frédéric Ozanam.

== Other uses ==
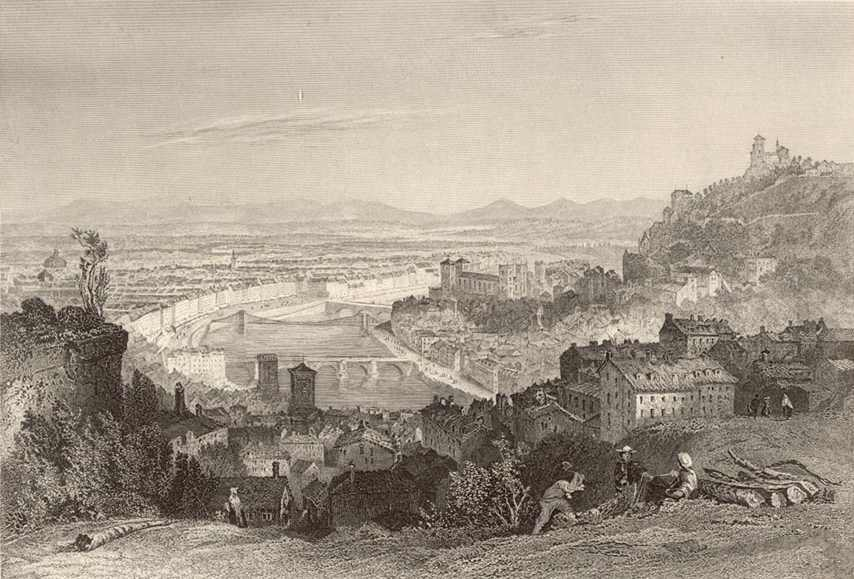
Lyon and Croix-Rousse in 1869.

Laurent Mourguet was an unemployed canut when he created the character Guignol and his eponymous puppet show for children, supposedly in his own image.

Cervelle de canut (lit. silk worker's brains) is a cheese spread/dip, a Lyonnais speciality. The dish is a base of fromage blanc, seasoned with chopped herbs, shallots, salt, pepper, olive oil and vinegar.

The canuts were the subject of songs by Aristide Bruant and Éric La Blanche.

In contemporary times, the word canut is often used to talk about citizens of Lyon in general in an affectionate way.

== See also ==
- Luddites
- History of silk
- Canut (surname)
