= Gare de Lyon (disambiguation) =

The Gare de Lyon is a large railway station in Paris.

Gare de Lyon may also refer to:

- Lyon-Part-Dieu station, a mainline railway station in the 3rd arrondissement of Lyon
- Lyon-Perrache station, a mainline railway station in the 2nd arrondissement of Lyon
- Lyon-Saint-Exupéry TGV station, a high-speed rail station near Lyon, directly attached to Lyon–Saint-Exupéry Airport
- Lyon-Gorge-de-Loup station, a railway station in the 9th arrondissement of Lyon
- Lyon-Jean Macé station, a railway station in the 7th arrondissement of Lyon
- Lyon-Saint-Paul station, a railway station in the 5th arrondissement of Lyon
- Lyon-Vaise station, a railway station in the 9th arrondissement of Lyon
- Gare de Lyon (Paris Metro), a Metro and RER station serving the railway station in Paris
