= Lyon-Gorge-de-Loup station =

Railway station in the 9th arrondissement of Lyon, France

Coordinates: 45°45′58″N 4°48′17″E

Lyon-Gorge-de-Loup
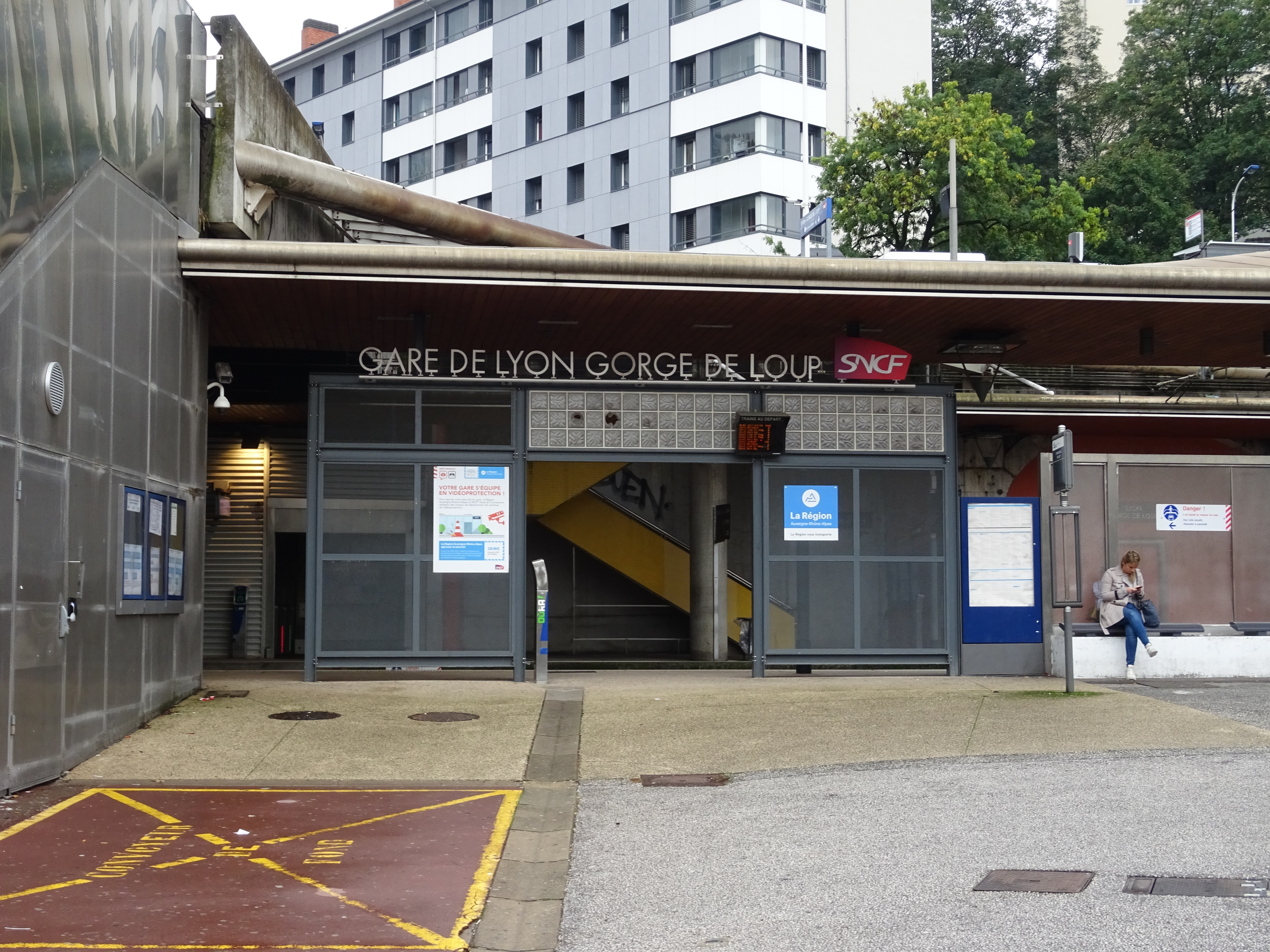
- Main entrance in 2019

General information
- Location: Rue du professeur Guérin; 9th arrondissement of Lyon, Metropolis of Lyon; France
- Owner: SNCF
- Operator: SNCF
- Line: Lyon-Saint-Paul – Montbrison
- Platforms: 2
- Tracks: 2
- Connections: Lyon Metro Lyon Metro Line D

Other information
- Station code: 87721175

Passengers
- 2023: 674,786

Services
Preceding station	TER Auvergne-Rhône-Alpes	Following station
Écully-la-Demi-Lune towards Brignais	21	Lyon-Saint-Paul Terminus
Écully-la-Demi-Lune towards Sain-Bel	22	Lyon-Saint-Paul Terminus
Connections to other stations
Preceding station	Lyon Metro	Following station
Valmy towards Gare de Vaise–Gérard Collomb	Line D transfer at Gorge de Loup	Vieux Lyon–Cathédrale Saint-Jean towards Gare de Vénissieux
Location

Lyon-Gorge-de-Loup station ((French pronunciation: [ljɔ̃ ɡɔʁʒ də lu])) is a railway station in the Gorge de Loup area of western Lyon, France, mainly used by TER ARA lines towards Lyon-Saint-Paul station. It is also served by the Tram-train de l'Ouest and Line D of the Lyon Metro network.

== Gallery ==
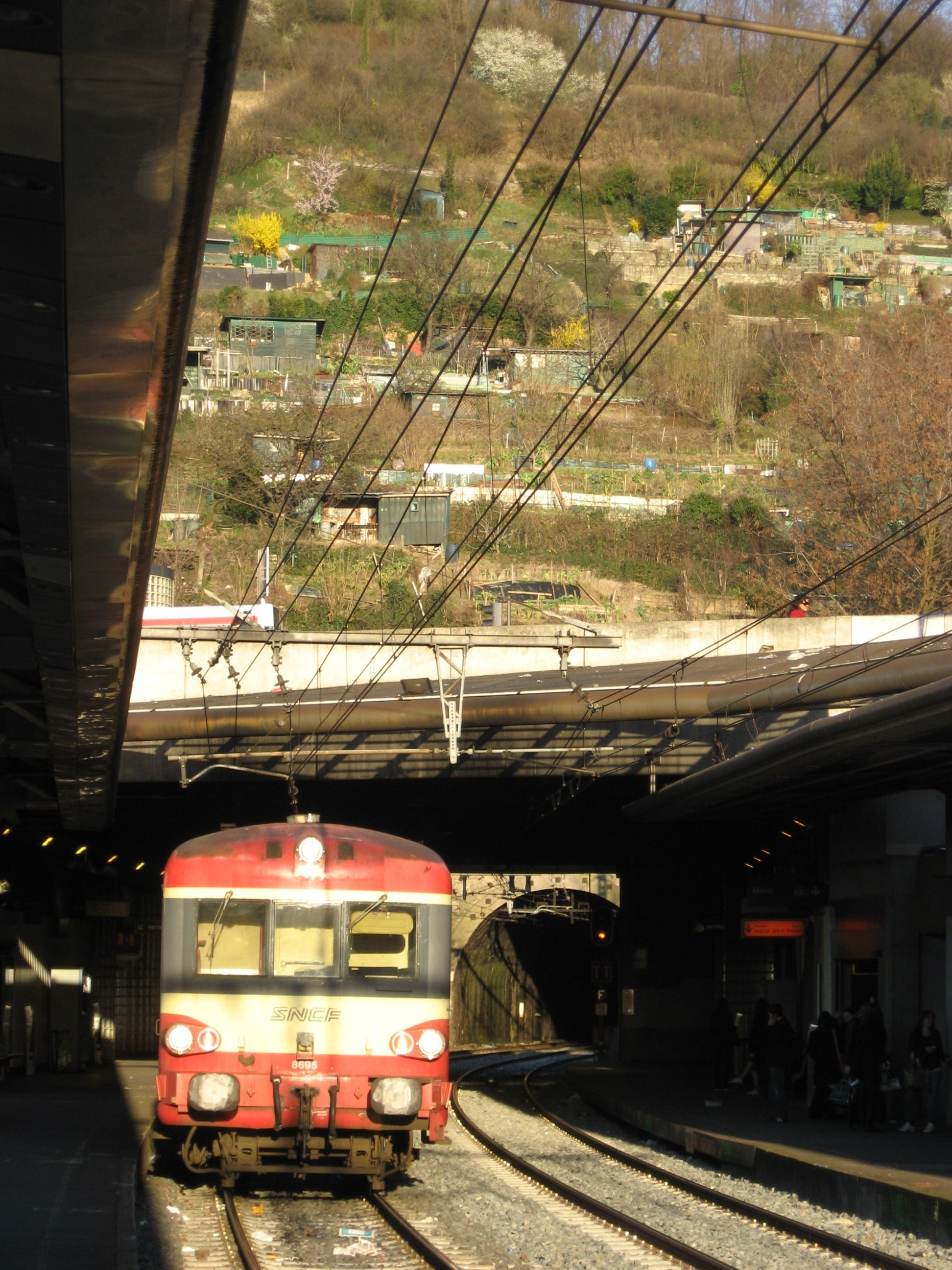
Gorge-de-Loup station platforms seen in 2009 prior to the introduction of Tram-train services.

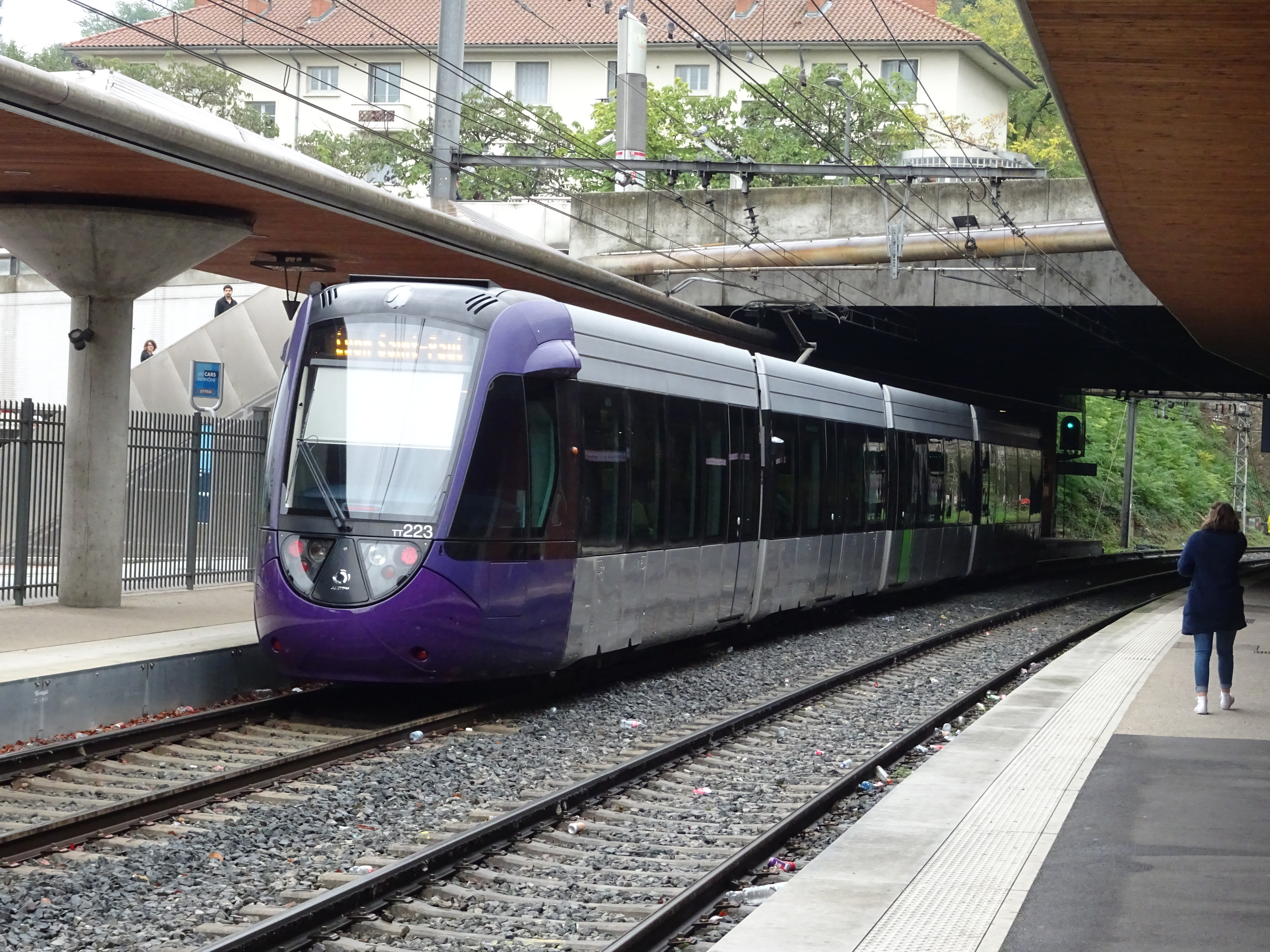
Tram-train service in 2019

== See also ==
- Transport in Rhône-Alpes
- TER Auvergne-Rhône-Alpes
- 9th arrondissement of Lyon
- Réseau Express de l'Aire urbaine Lyonnaise
