= Tram-train de l'ouest lyonnais =

Railway network in Lyon, France

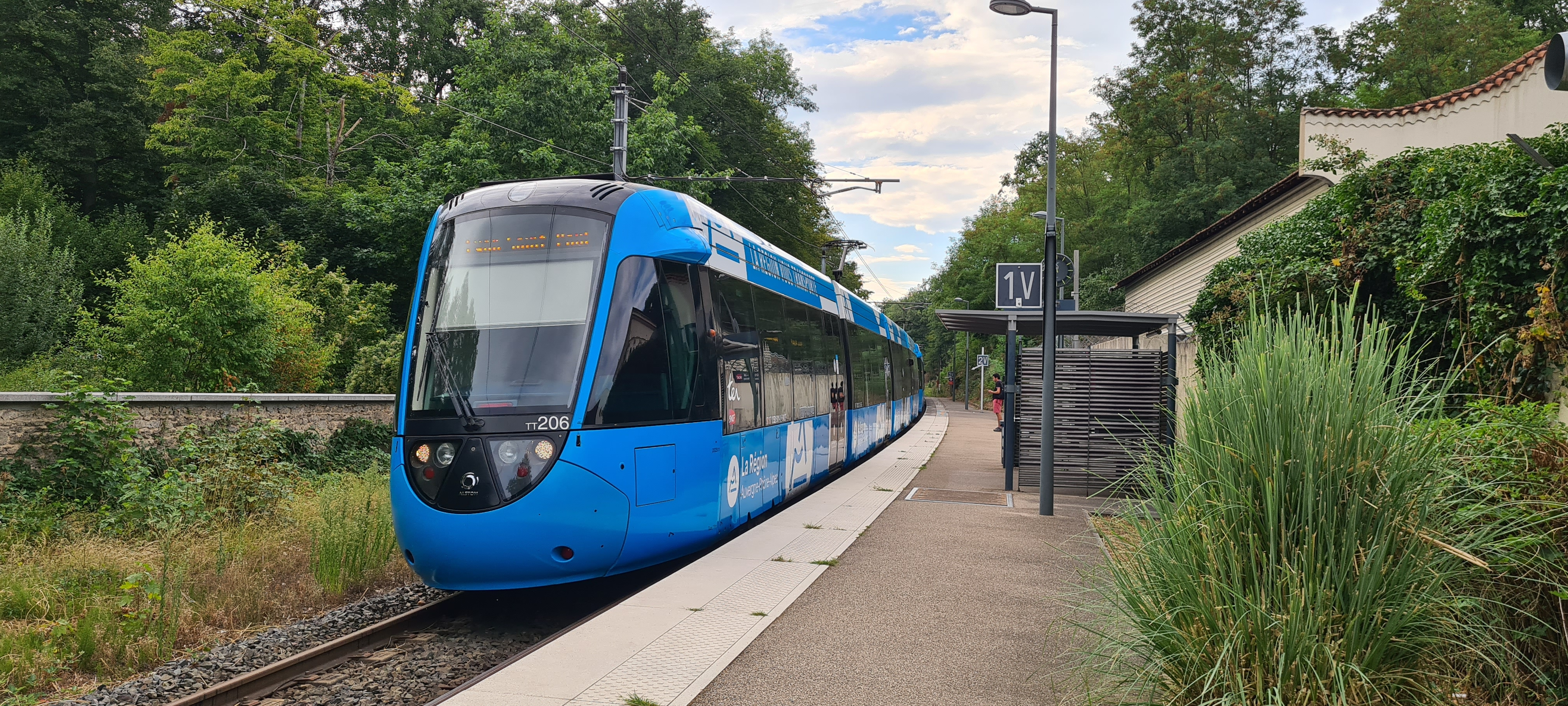
- Tram-train in Casino-Lacroix-Laval station

Overview
- Locale: Lyon, France
- Transit type: Tram-train
- Number of lines: 2 (+1 planned)
- Number of stations: 23

Operation
- Began operation: 22 September 2012
- Operator: SNCF Voyageurs
- Number of vehicles: 24 Alstom Citadis Dualis

Technical
- System length: 55 km (34 mi)
- Track gauge: 1,435 mm (4 ft 8 1/2 in) standard gauge
System map

The tram-train de l'ouest lyonnais (in English, Western Lyon tram-train) is a tram-train network in the urban area of Lyon in the region Auvergne-Rhône-Alpes, with two lines departing from Lyon-Saint-Paul station. This network is managed as a part of the TER Auvergne-Rhône-Alpes regional train system and it is operated by SNCF Voyageurs.

Both two tram-train lines offers a connection with Lyon Metro Line D at Lyon Gorge de Loup.

== Project ==
The project consists of the creation of three tram-train lines departing from Lyon Saint-Paul to Sain-Bel, Brignais and Lozanne, with the aim to improve the traffic between these railway stations.

Some rail lines have been doubled, platforms rebuilt, and stations modernised. The total cost of the project is around €150·2m.

While the lines to Sain-Bel and Brignais were opened in 2012, the third line to Lozanne is still planned but postponed. Currently, classic TER trains runs from Lozanne to Tassin, connecting with the tram-train line from Lyon Saint-Paul to Sain-Bel.

== Lines ==
=== Lyon Saint-Paul - Sain-Bel ===
The line from Lyon Saint-Paul to Sain-Bel started running on 22 September 2012.

=== Lyon Saint-Paul - Brignais ===
The line from Lyon Saint-Paul to Brignais started running on 8 December 2012.

== Gallery ==
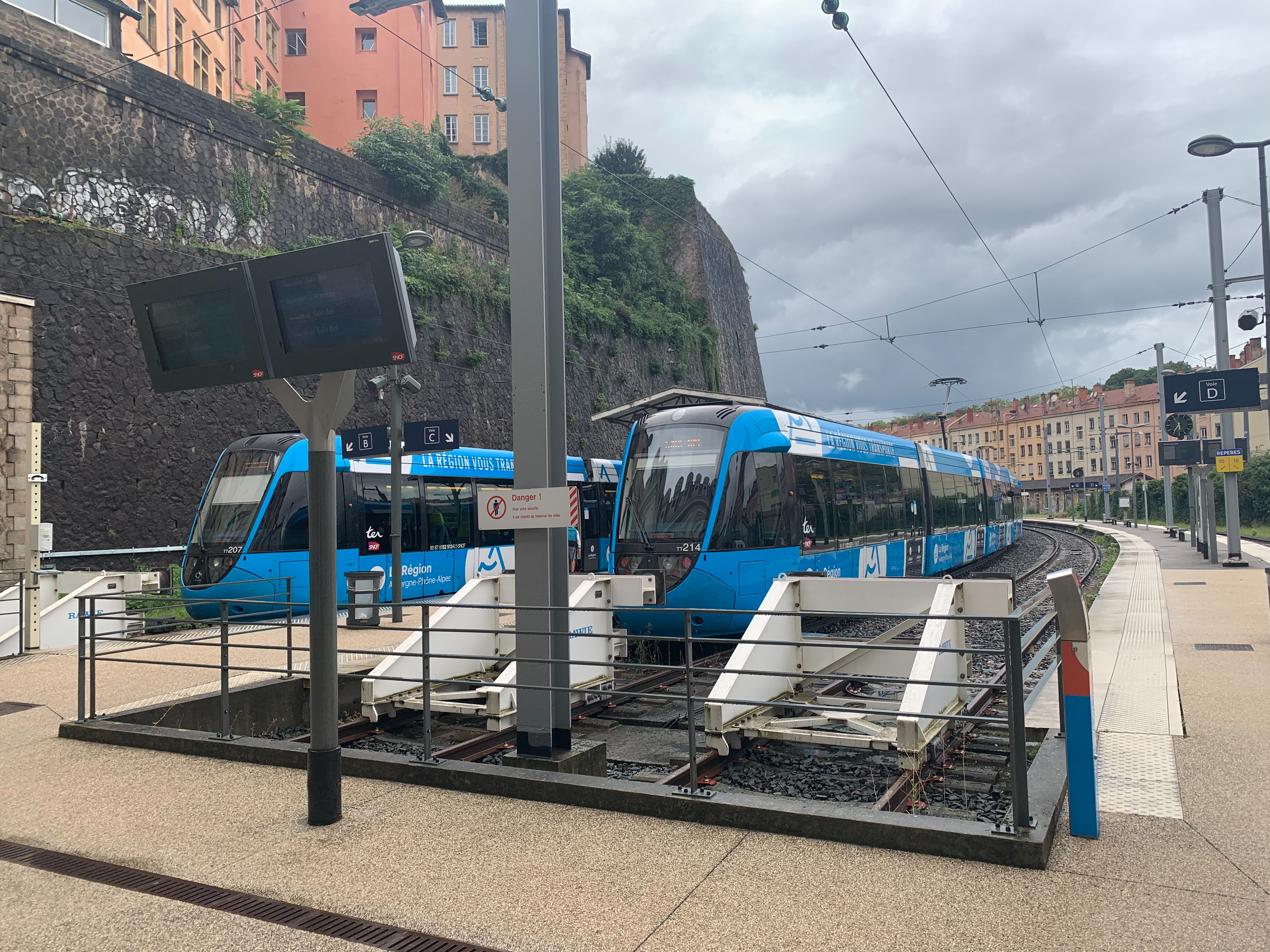
Lyon Saint-Paul

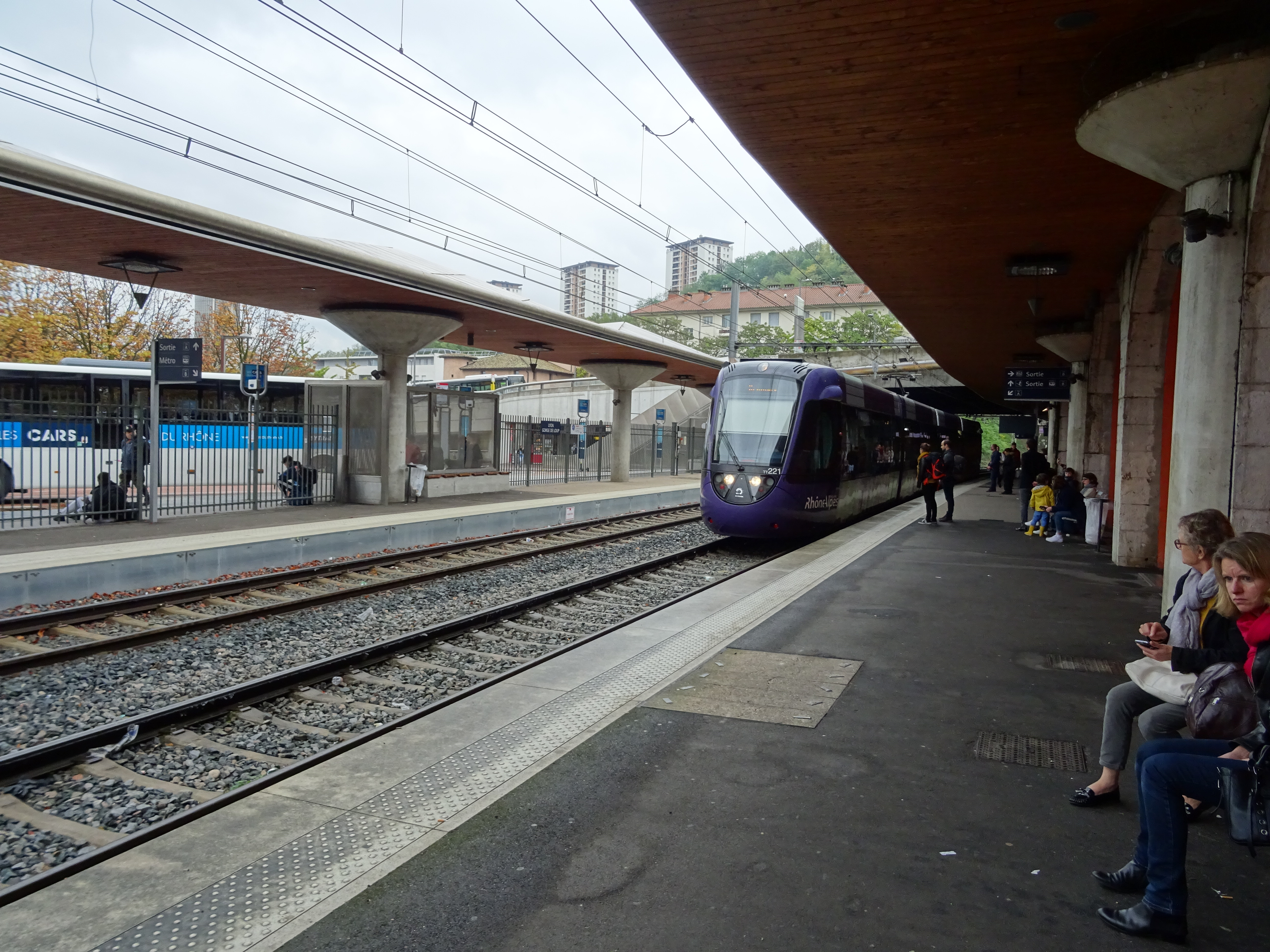
Lyon Gorge de Loup

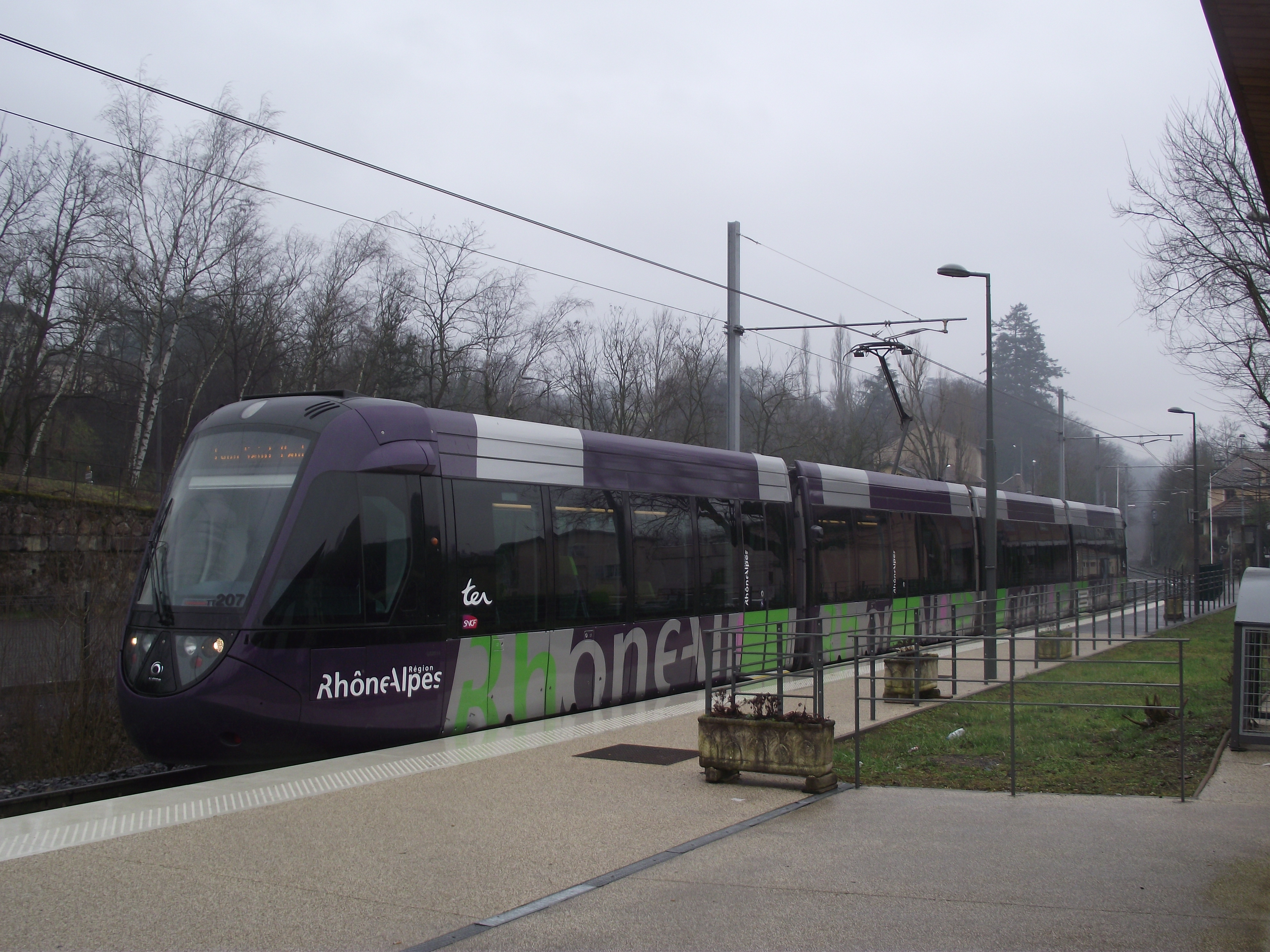
Sain-Bel station

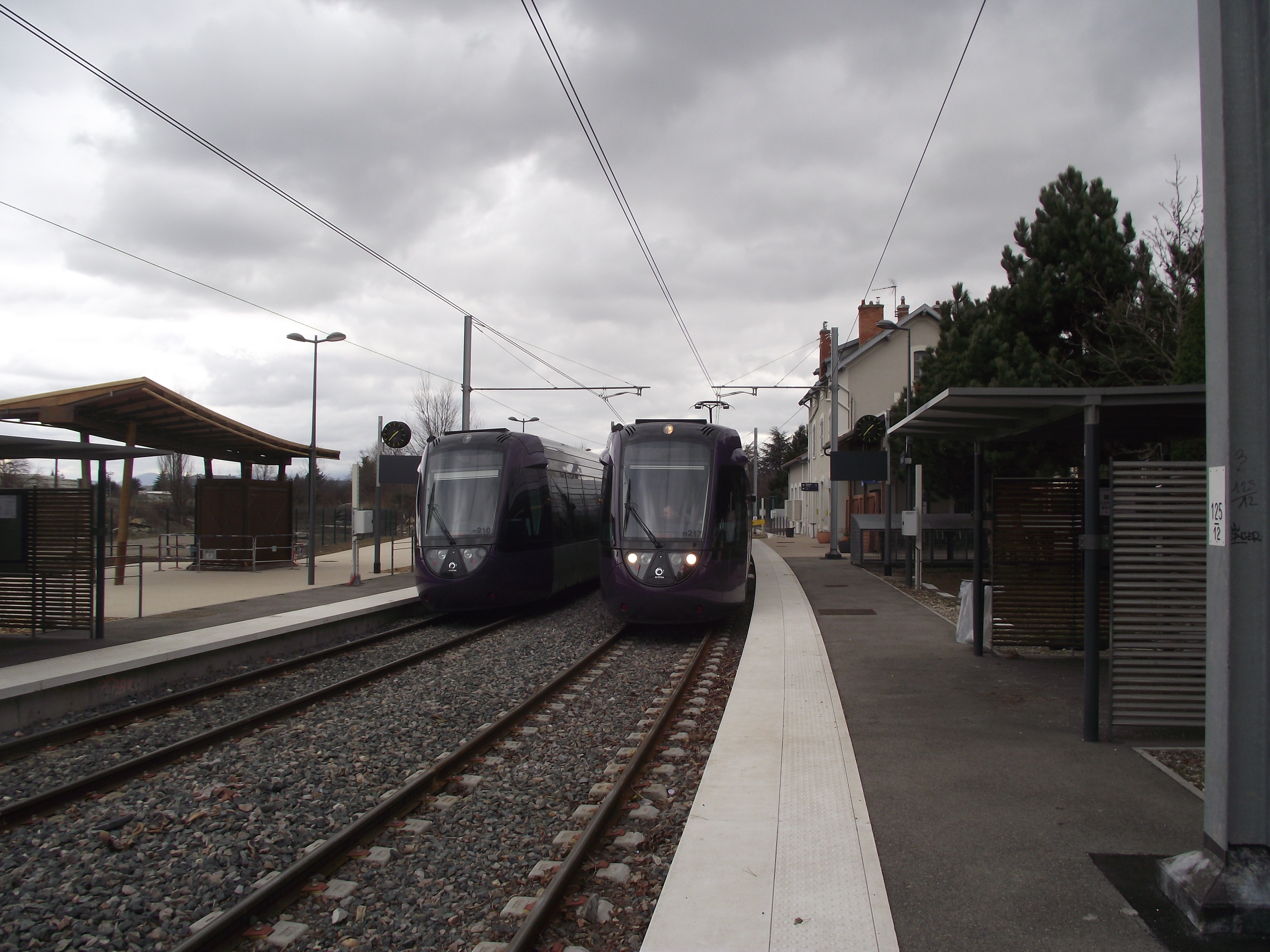
Brignais station

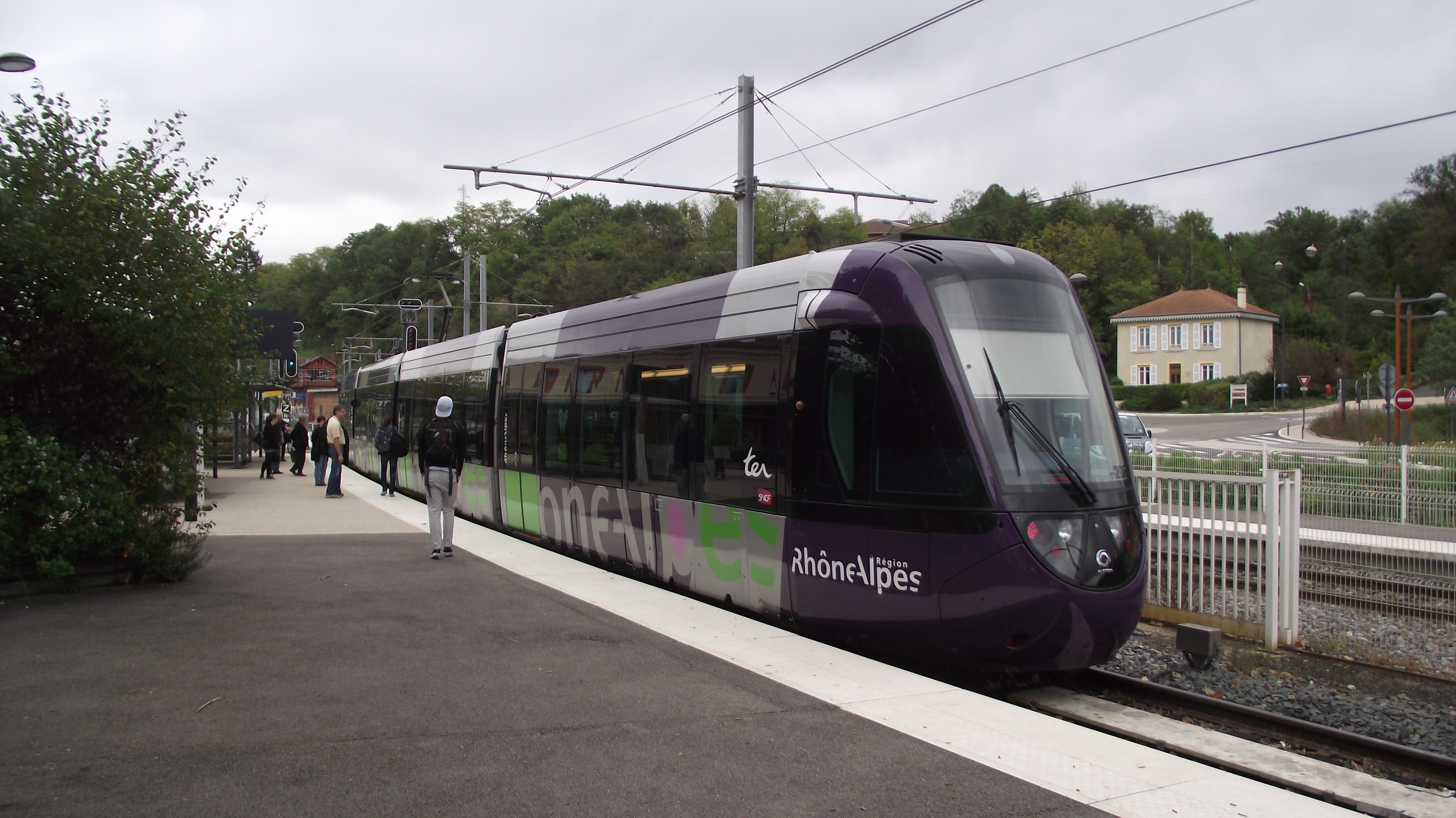
L'Arbresle station

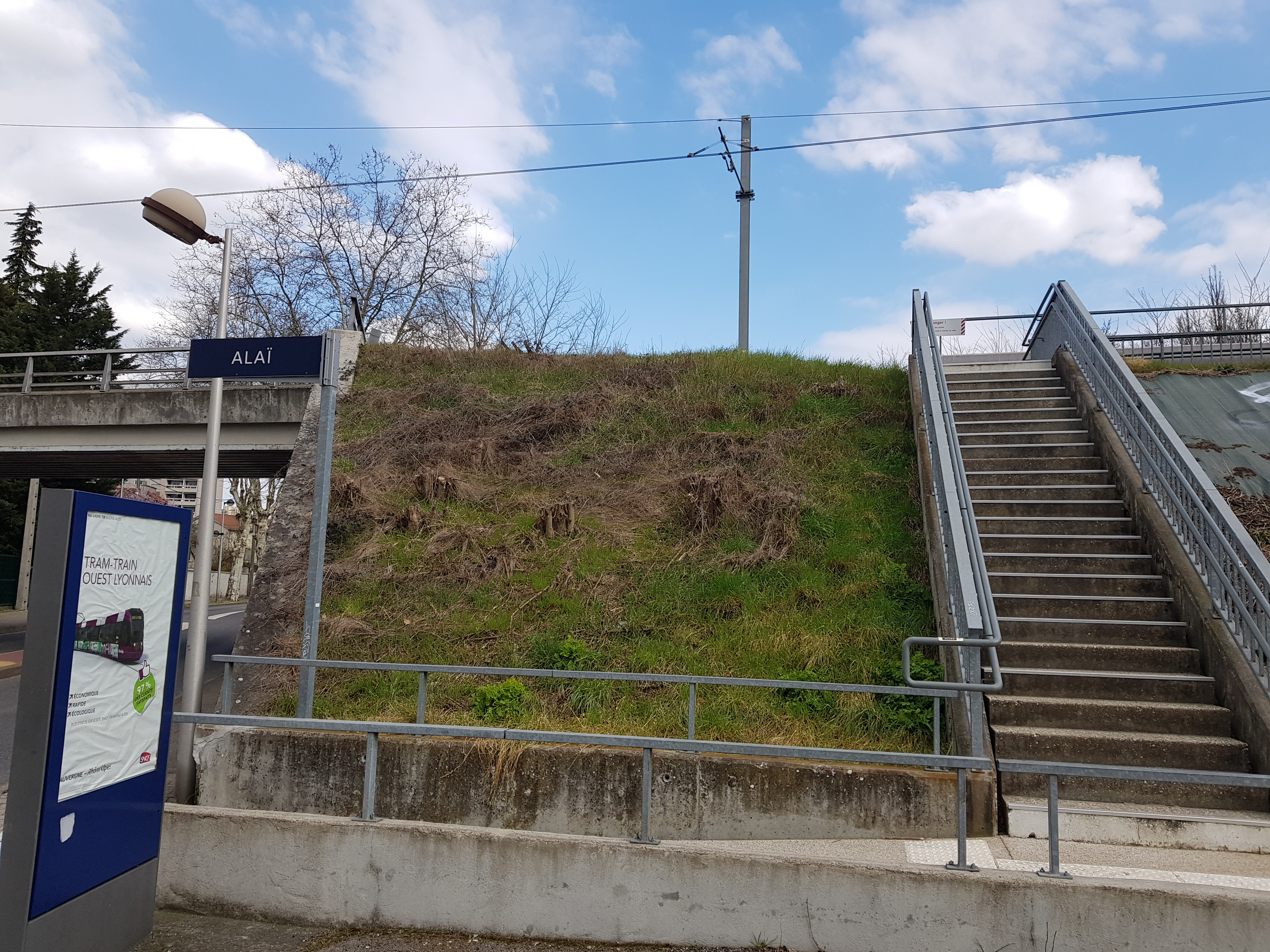
Alaï station

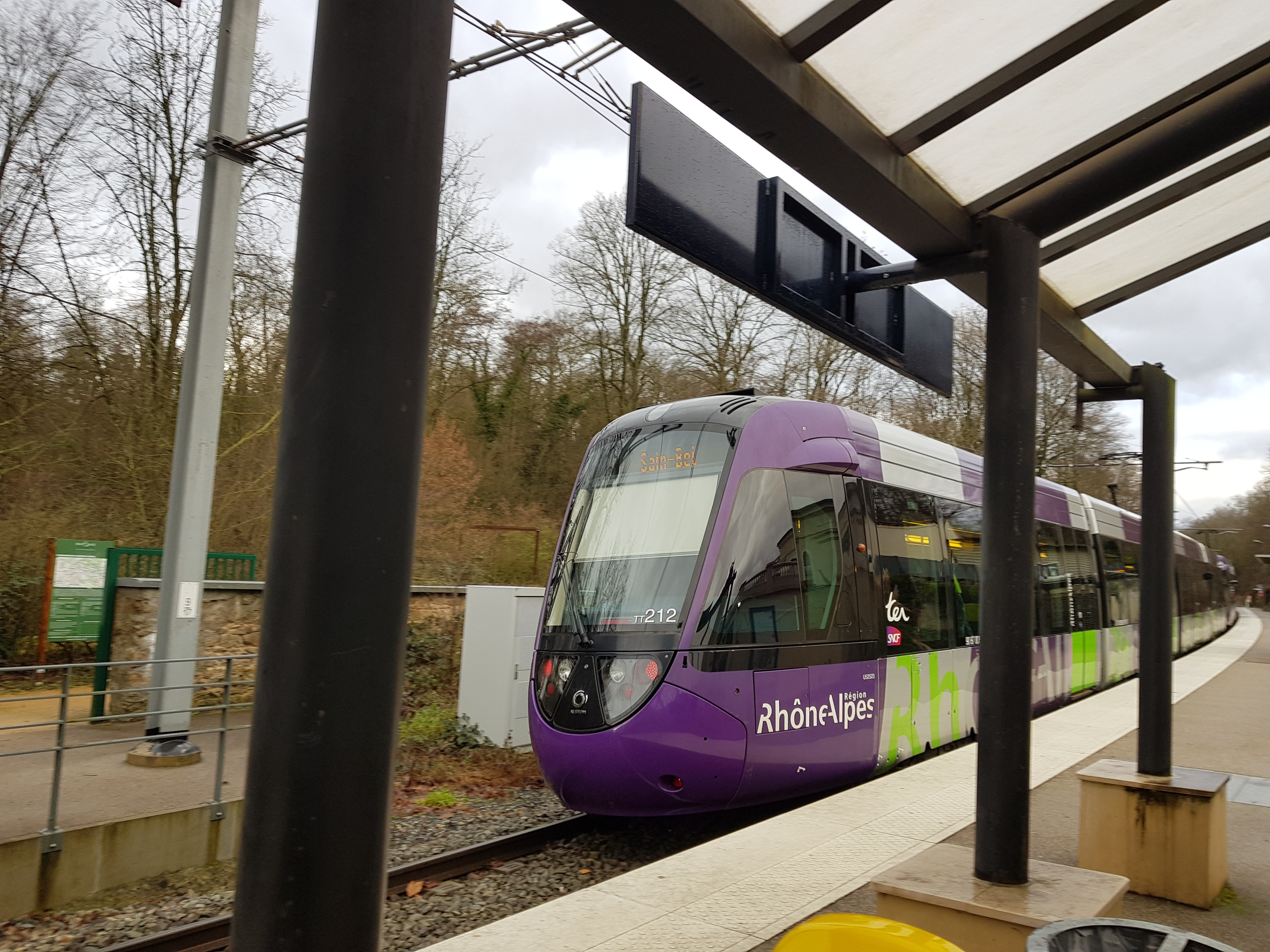
Casino-Lacroix-Laval station

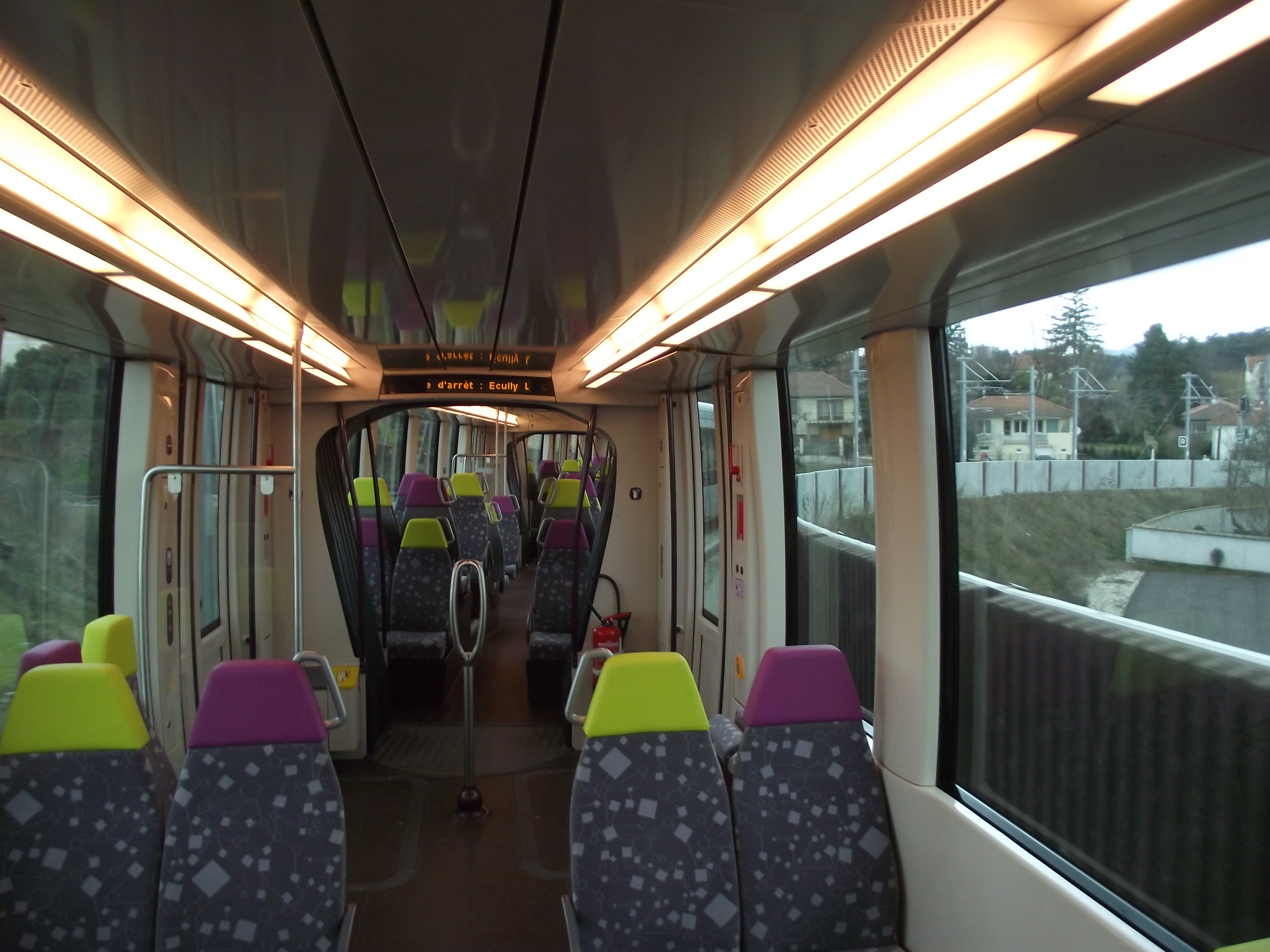
Interior of a tram-train

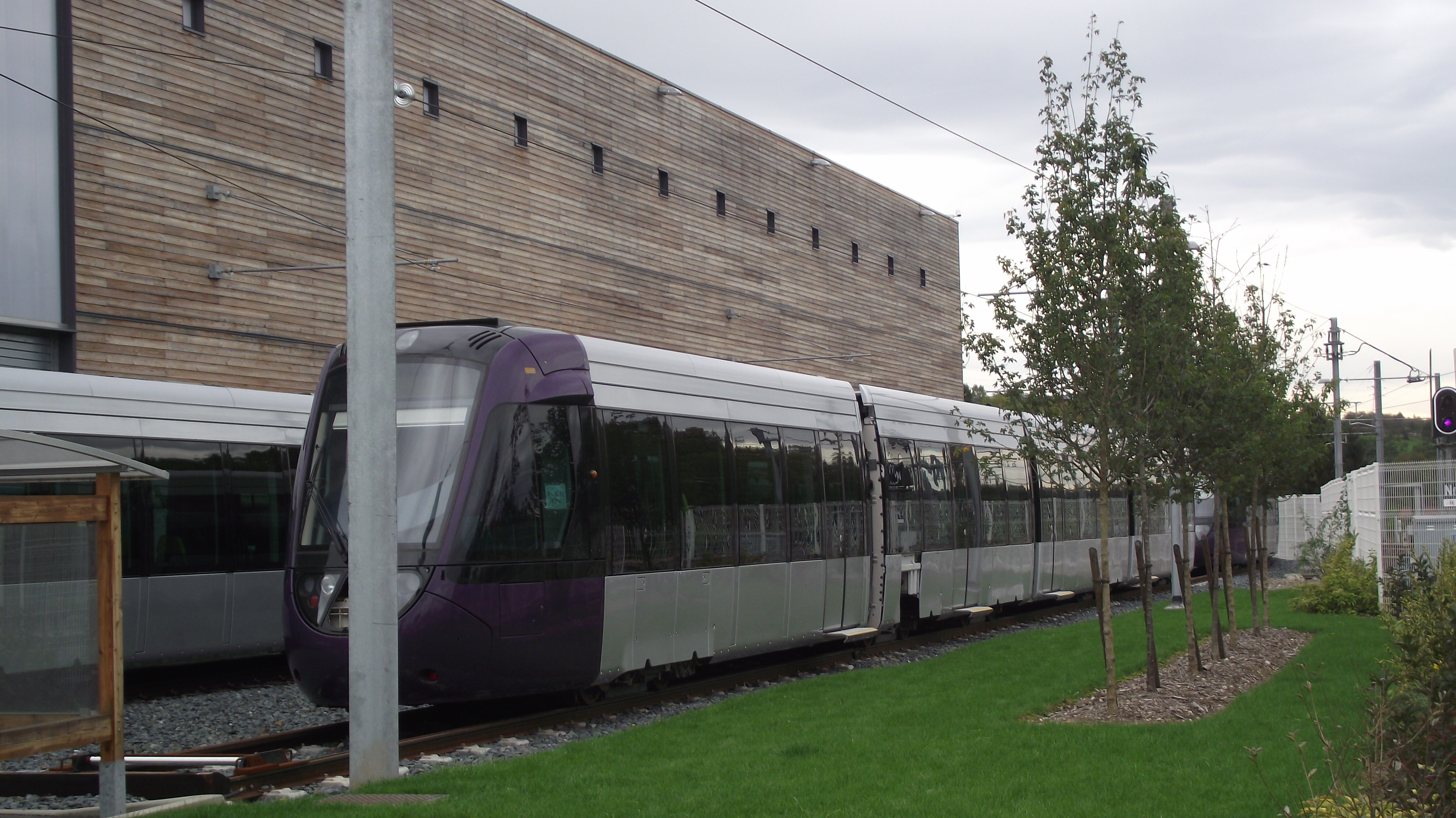
Tram-train depot in L'Arbresle

== See also ==
- Nantes tram-train
- Lyon tramway
- Transport in Rhône-Alpes
