= Lyon-Saint-Paul station =

Railway station in the 5th arrondissement of Lyon, France

Lyon-Saint-Paul
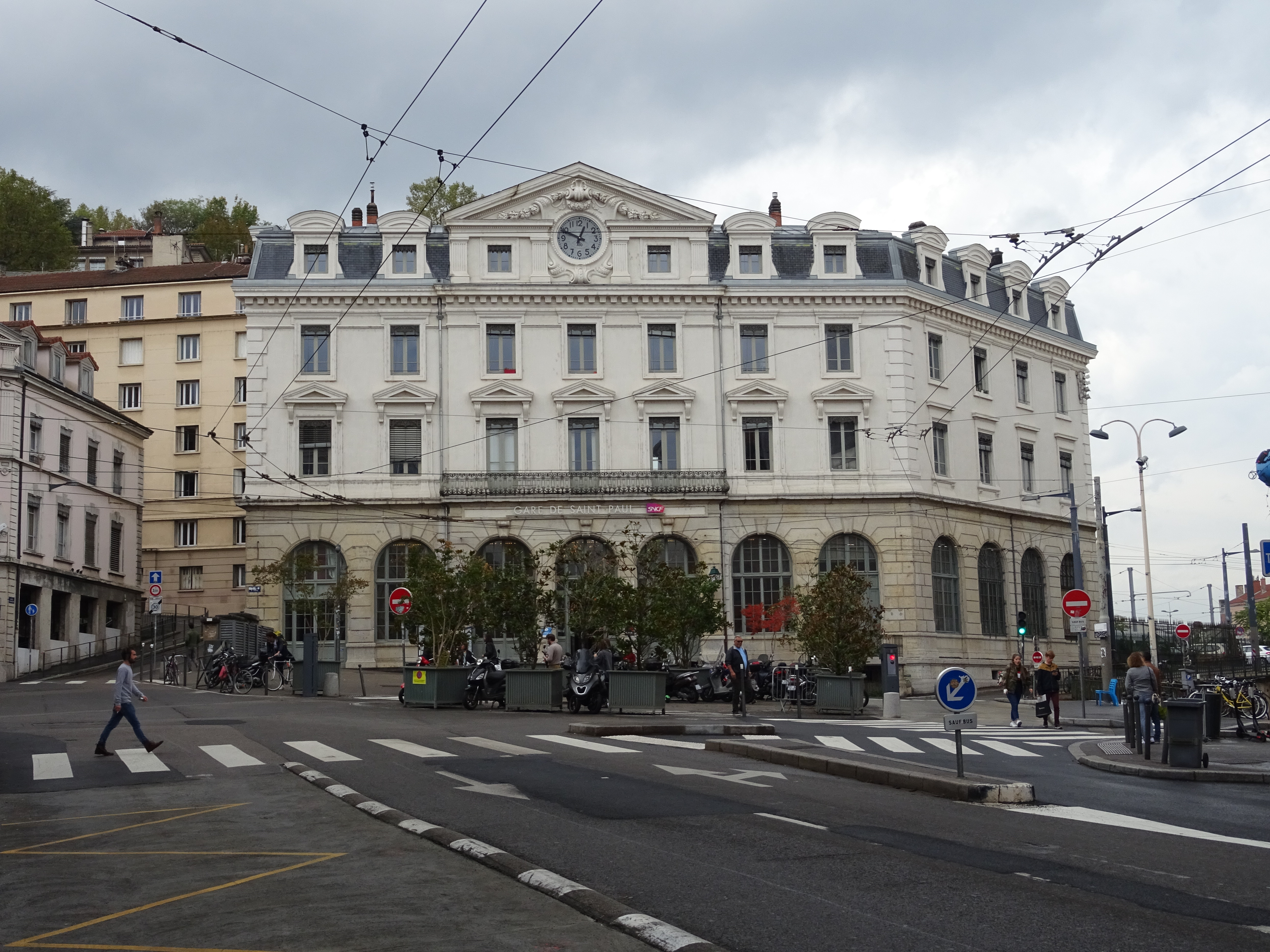
- The building in 2019

General information
- Location: 11 bis, Place Saint-Paul; 69005 Lyon; France
- Coordinates: 45°45′58″N 4°49′37″E
- Owner: SNCF
- Operator: SNCF
- Line: Lyon-Saint-Paul – Montbrison
- Platforms: 2 island platforms
- Tracks: 4

Other information
- Station code: 87721159

History
- Opened: 12 January 1876

Passengers
- 2024: 1,636,218

Services
Preceding station	TER Auvergne-Rhône-Alpes	Following station
Lyon-Gorge-de-Loup towards Brignais	21	Terminus
Lyon-Gorge-de-Loup towards Sain-Bel	22	Terminus
Location

Lyon-Saint-Paul is a railway station in the 5th arrondissement of Lyon, France. It is located in the area of the same name at the northern end of the Vieux Lyon quarter, between the base of the Fourvière hill and the river Saône. The station is a terminus for local trains serving the western suburbs of the city.

Since September 2012 the station is the city terminus of the Western Lyon Tram-Train, connecting Lyon with its western suburbs.

== History ==
The railway station underwent significant renovations between 2008 and 2012. In addition to upgrades to passenger amenities, the 28 apartments on the second, third and fourth floors were renovated and re-opened in 2013.

== Services ==
The station is served by two Tram-Train services operated by TER Auvergne-Rhône-Alpes.

- Tram-Train services (TER) Brignais - Lyon-St-Paul
- Tram-Train services (TER) Sain-Bel - L'Arbresle - Tassin - Lyon-St-Paul

== Gallery ==
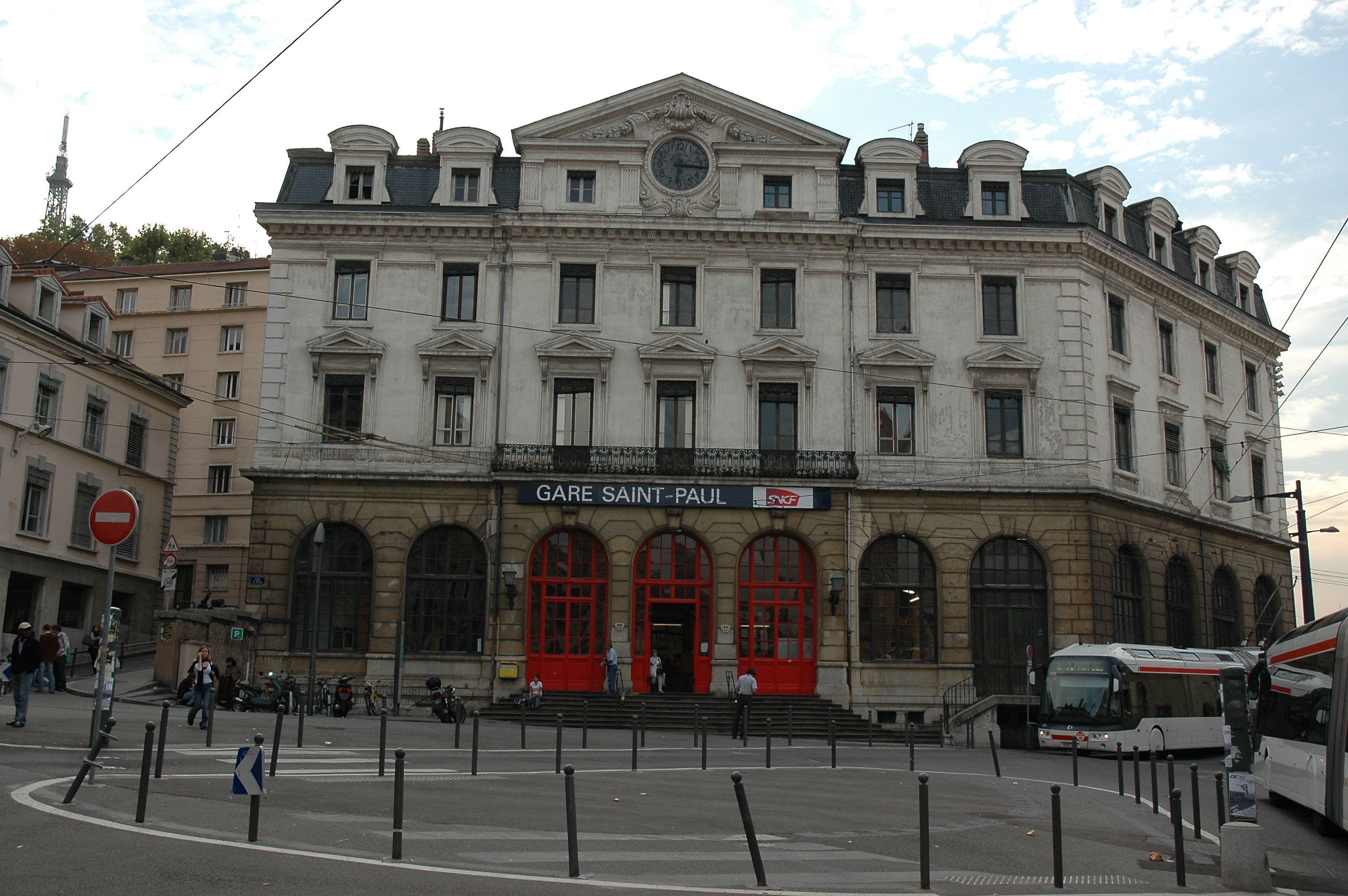
The main entrance of the railway station prior to renovation.

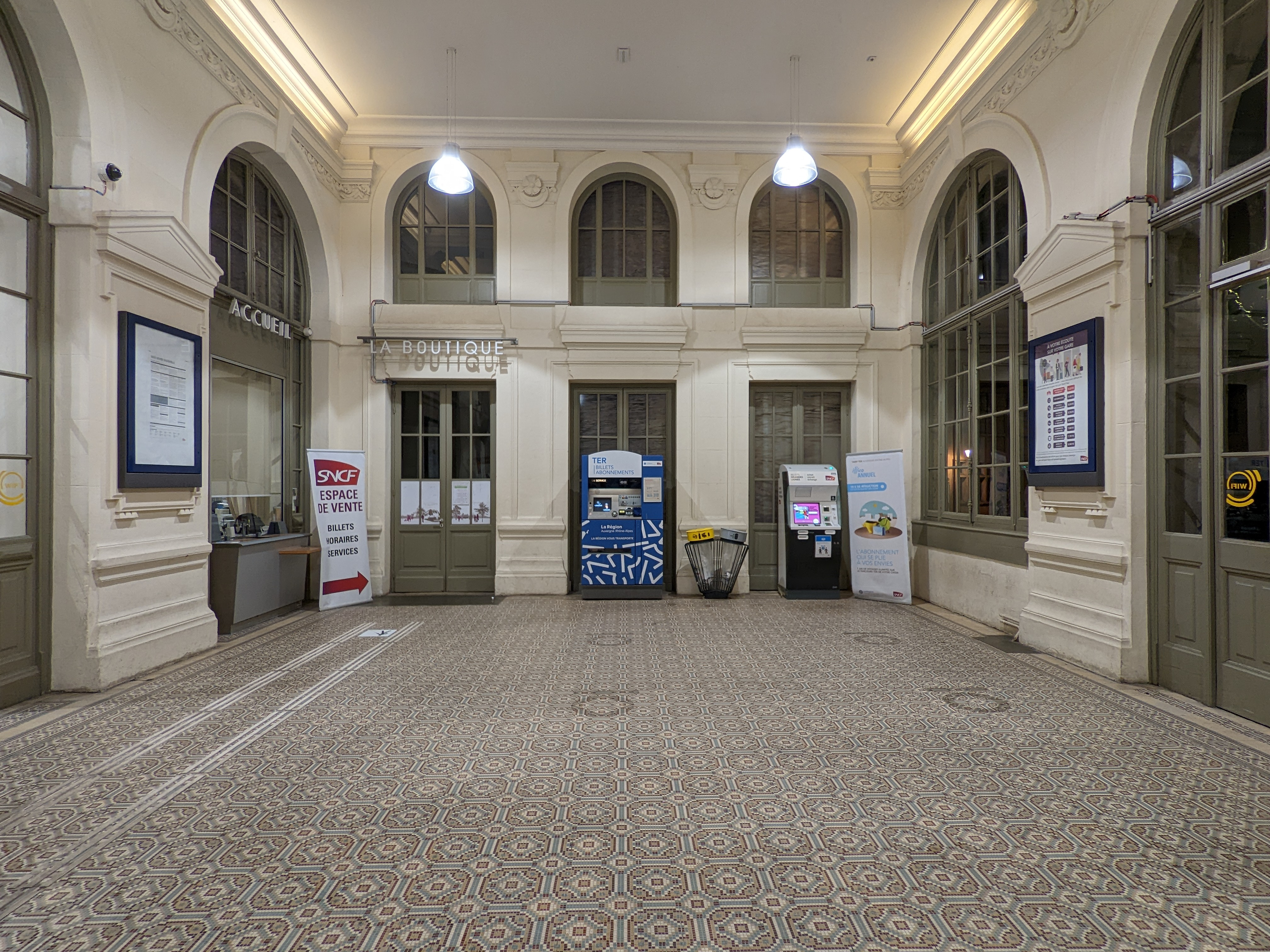
The station hall with its ticket office and ticket machines in 2022.

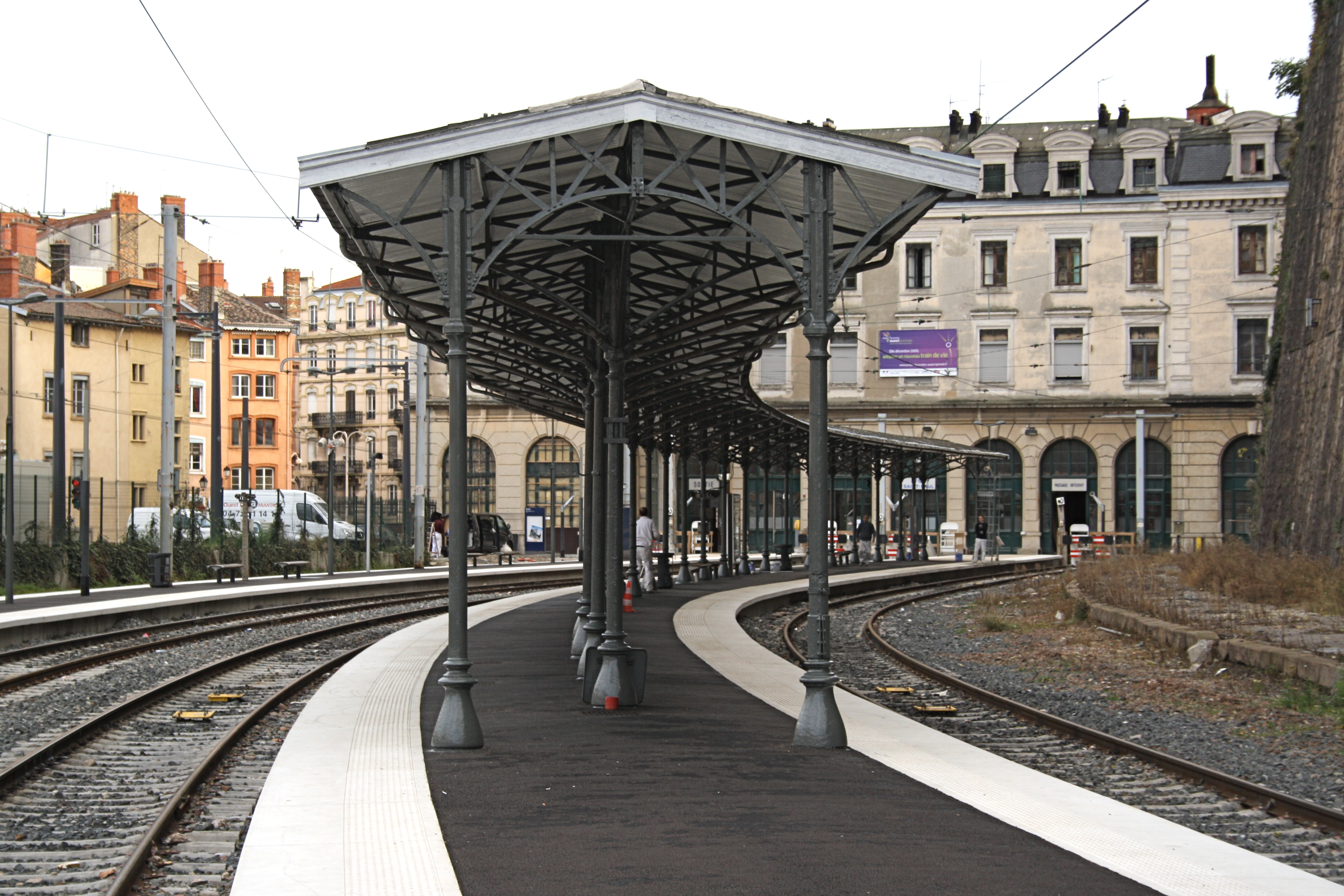
Platform view of the station.

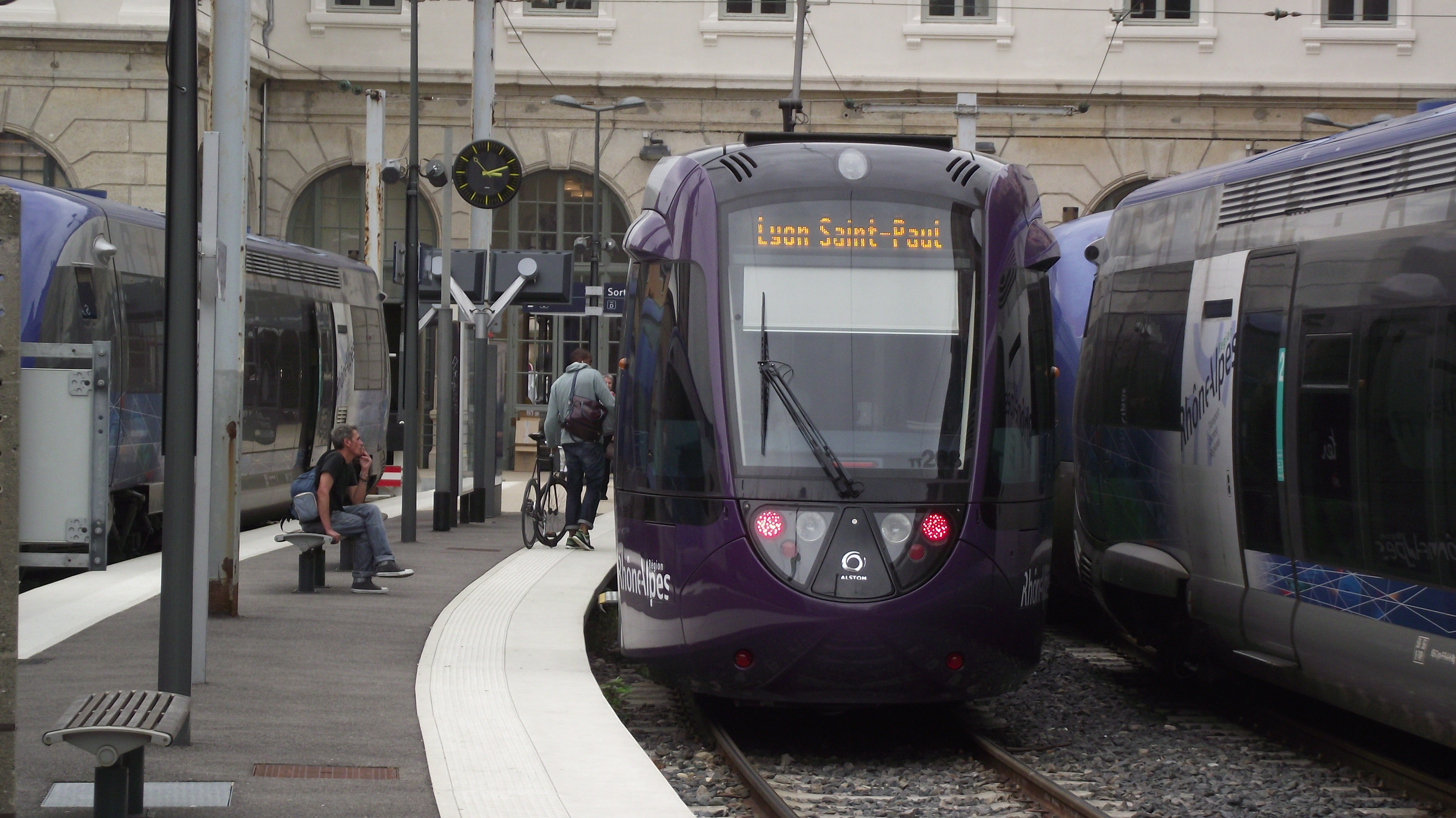
A tram-train at the station in 2012.

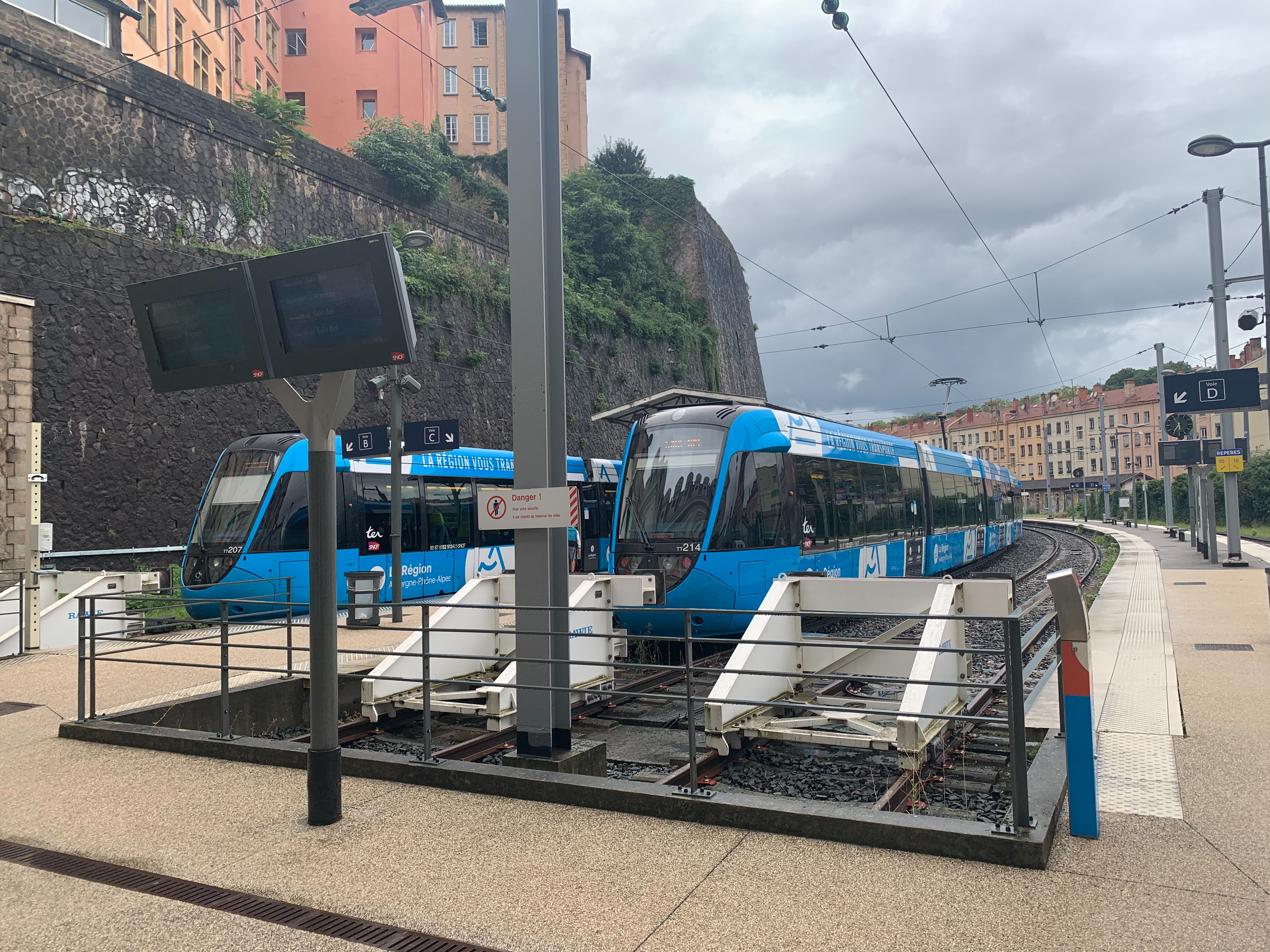
Tram-trains in the station in 2021.

== See also ==
- Tramways in Lyon
- Transport in Rhône-Alpes
- Tram-train de l'ouest lyonnais
- TER Auvergne-Rhône-Alpes
