= Nantes tram-train =

Light rail line in France

Tram-train de Nantes
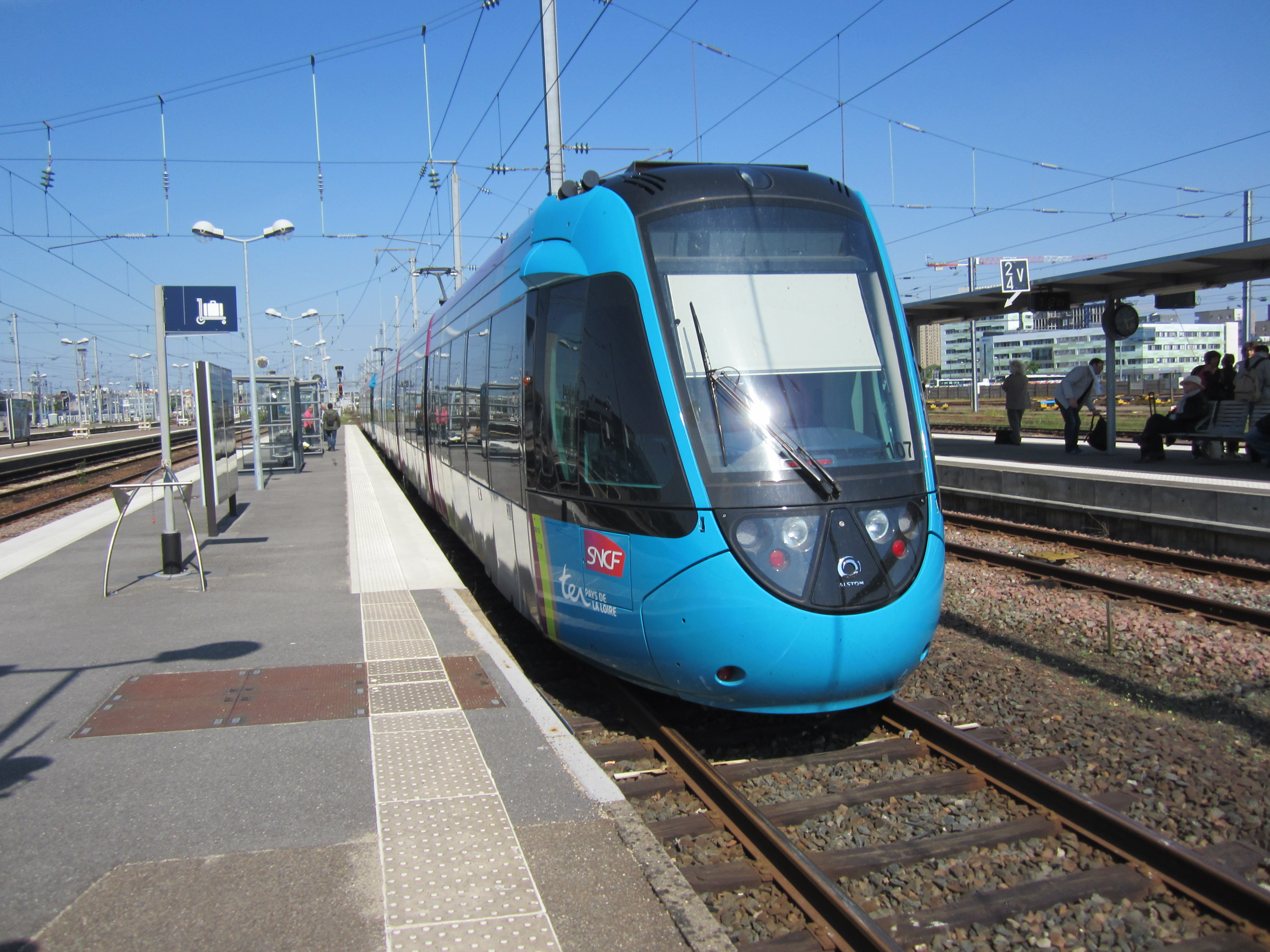

Overview
- Owner: SNCF
- Locale: Nantes, France
- Transit type: Tram-train
- Number of lines: 2
- Line number: Nantes - Clisson; Nantes - Châteaubriant
- Number of stations: 18

Operation
- Began operation: June 15, 2011

Technical
- System length: 64 km (40 mi)
- Track gauge: 1,435 mm (4 ft 8 1/2 in) standard gauge
- Electrification: 750 V DC; 25 kV 50 Hz AC

The Nantes tram-train (French: Tram-train de Nantes) is a tram-train network operating in the French city of Nantes and the surrounding region.

== Background ==
The Nantes to Châteaubriant railway line was part of a former Nantes to Rennes railway route which originally opened in 1877. The Nantes to Châteaubriant section closed to passenger traffic in 1980 and to freight in 2008. Approval to modernise this line was received in 2009; and in 2014, the line reopened for exclusive use of the Nantes tram-train network, becoming the second line to operate after an existing line to Clisson opened in 2011, sharing track with mainline trains. The 64 km single-track railway line between Nantes and Châteaubriant in France was reopened for tram-train service in February 2014 after 34 years.

== See also ==
- Nantes tramway
- Tram-train de l'ouest lyonnais
