= Réseau Express de l'Aire urbaine Lyonnaise =

The Réseau Express de l'Aire métropolitaine Lyonnaise (or Real) is a project that consists in improving and unifying some railways lines in the Lyon metropolitan area. It is said to be a "RER à la lyonnaise" ("RER in the style of Lyon", referencing the Réseau Express Régional or RER in Paris and the wider Île-de-France). The most significant project is the "tram-train" in west area of Lyon urban area in 2011 and better frequencies of the trains.

This project comes from the "Schéma régional des transports" of 1997 and has been initiated by many entities : région Rhône-Alpes, Communauté urbaine de Lyon, Sytral and SNCF, and several departements (Rhône, Loire, Isère, Ain).

== See also ==
- Transports en commun lyonnais
- Transports in Rhône-Alpes
- Lyon
