= Lyon Metro Line D =

Metro line in Lyon, France

Line D

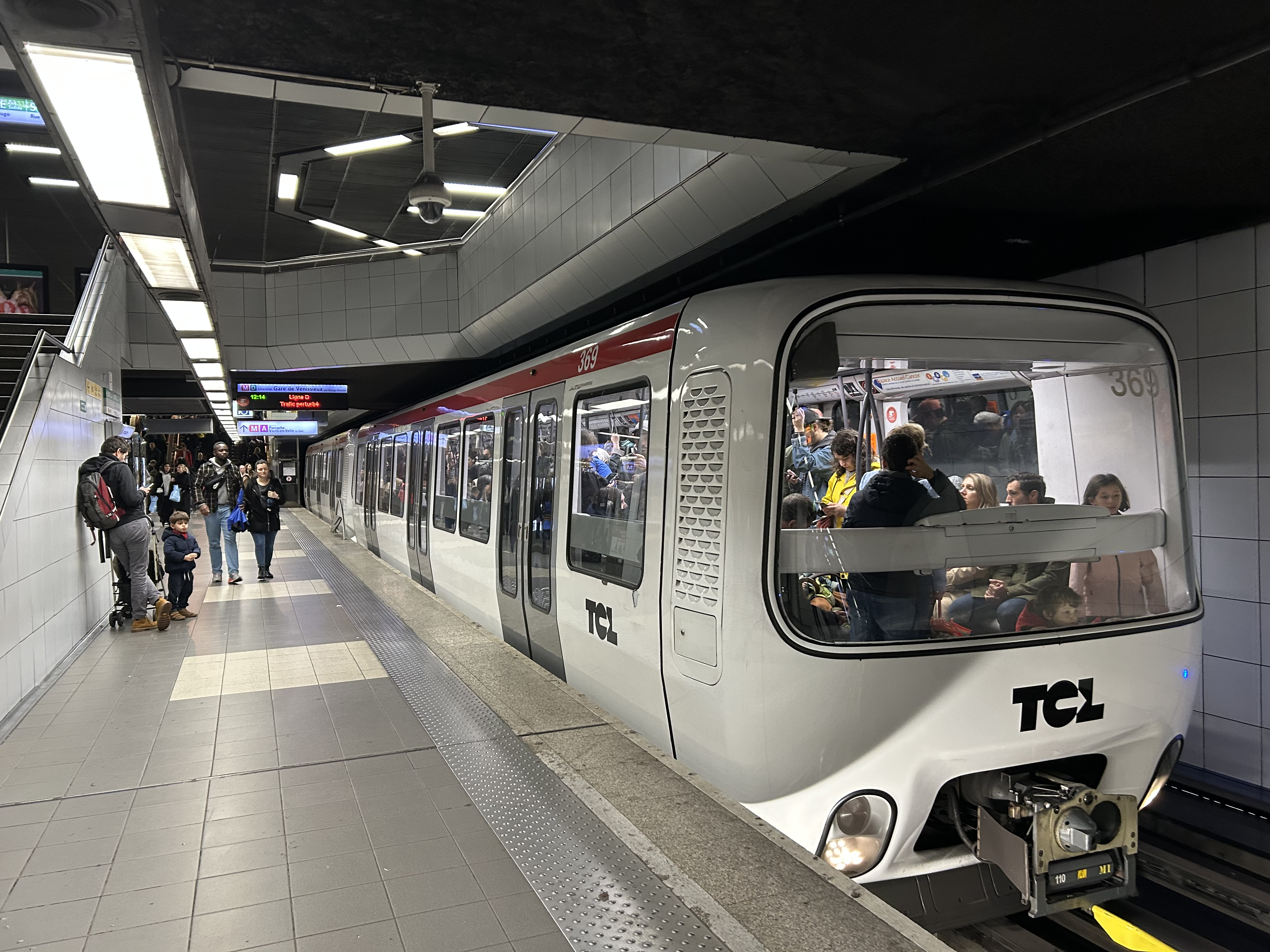

Overview
- Native name: Ligne D
- Termini: Gare de Vaise; Gare de Vénissieux
- Connecting lines: Lyon Metro Lyon Metro Line A Lyon Metro Line B Funiculars of Lyon Lyon tramway Lyon tramway#Line T1 Lyon tramway#Line T2 Lyon tramway#Line T4 Lyon tramway#Line T5 Lyon tramway#Line T6
- Stations: 15

Service
- Type: Rapid transit
- System: Lyon Metro
- Operator: TCL
- Rolling stock: MPL 85
- Ridership: Annual: 84,201,000 (2019)

History
- Opened: 9 September 1991
- Last extension: 28 April 1997

Technical
- Line length: 12.5 km (7.8 mi)
- Character: Driverless (MAGGALY)
- Rack system: None
- Track gauge: 1,435 mm (4 ft 8 1/2 in) standard gauge with rollways outside of track
- Electrification: 750 V DC third rail (guide bars)
- Average inter-station distance: 929 m (3,048 ft)

Line D (Ligne D) is a rapid-transit line on the Lyon Metro. It runs east–west underneath the two major rivers of Lyon, France, connecting Vieux Lyon with the Presqu'ile and the Part-Dieu region. Line D commenced operation under human control on 4 September 1991, between Gorge de Loup and Grange Blanche. It was extended from Grange Blanche to Gare de Vénissieux on 11 December 1992, when it switched to automatic (driverless) operation, also known as MAGGALY (Métro Automatique à Grand Gabarit de l’Agglomération Lyonnaise). On 28 April 1997, the line was extended from Gorge de Loup to Gare de Vaise.

Being the deepest of the lines in Lyon, it was constructed mainly using boring machines and passes under both rivers, the Rhône and the Saône. At 12.5 kilometres (7.8 mi) long and serving 15 stations, it is also the longest metro line in Lyon.

== List of the stations ==
Metro D entering in the station Guillotière–Gabriel Péri.

- Gare de Vaise
- Valmy
- Gorge de Loup (Western Lyon tram-train)
- Vieux Lyon–Cathédrale Saint-Jean
- Bellecour
- Guillotière–Gabriel Péri
- Saxe–Gambetta
- Garibaldi
- Sans Souci
- Monplaisir–Lumière
- Grange Blanche
- Laënnec
- Mermoz–Pinel
- Parilly
- Gare de Vénissieux

Map of the line

== Chronology ==
- 9 September 1991: Opening of line D from Gorge de Loup to Grange Blanche
- 11 December 1992: Extension from Grange Blanche to Gare de Vénissieux
- 28 April 1997: Extension from Gorge de Loup to Gare de Vaise

== Rolling stock ==
Since the opening of the line in 1991, there are 36 MPL 85 trains. The MPL 85 are composed of 2 cars per trainset.

From 2020, only during peak hours, each train could combine two MPL 85 trainsets and form a single train of 4 cars.

In 2016, new MPL 16 trains have been ordered to Alstom. 18 of them will circulate on the line starting from 2027, in addition to MPL 85 trains. The 2 cars of each train will be connected with gangways, which is a novelty in Lyon Metro rolling stock.

The MPL 16 trains won't be able to run on the line D with the current driverless system, MAGGALY. To overcome this problem, the line D will get a new driverless system, the same as the one equipping line B since 2022, where MPL 16 circulate too.
