= Transport in Rhône-Alpes =

Rhône-Alpes is a major European transit hub, linking northern France and Europe to the Mediterranean area. Millions travel along its motorways in summertime from Paris to holidays at the sea. The E15 Euroroute (Britain to Spain) runs through the region. There are international airports at Lyon, Grenoble and Saint-Étienne and many other minor airports and airfields.

The region is also a transport hub for the rail-network with the TGV running through Lyon from Paris and the north, to the Mediterranean. A trans-national, high-speed rail-link is projected from Lyon to Turin.

== Rail ==
Numerous cities of the region Rhône-Alpes are served by TGV :

- The LGV Méditerranée: Marseille, Lyon Part-Dieu, Valence TGV, and Montélimar.
- To Paris : Lyon Part-Dieu, Valence TGV, Montélimar, Chambéry, Grenoble, Bourg Saint-Maurice, Saint-Étienne
- In construction, a line to the North-East: Besançon, Strasbourg and Lyon Part-Dieu)
- In construction, a line to Turin: Lyon Part-Dieu, Challes-les-eaux, Grenoble-Université Gières

The TGV line Paris-Grenoble serves the international airport Lyon Saint-Exupéry.

Every weekend in winter, Bourg-Saint-Maurice becomes one of the busiest stations in the region, when it is served by TGV trains from Paris and from Brussels, and by Eurostar from London.

When a project of RER called Réseau Express de l'Aire urbaine Lyonnaise (REAL) is built, it will be the first RER of the province, the only other one being in Paris. Another RER called CEVA is planned for 2017, for the region of The leman lake (Geneva, Annemasse, Thonon-les-bains, Evian-les-bains) with extensions to La roche / foron, Annecy. Another railroad project is in realisation in Grenoble to link the suburbs.

There are also tourist train lines in Rhône-Alpes (in Ardèche, in the south of Grenoble and Mont-Blanc)

== Road ==
Rhône-Alpes is a major European transit hub, linking northern France and Europe to the Mediterranean area. Millions travel along its motorways in summertime from Paris to holidays at the sea. The E15 Euroroute (Britain to Spain) runs through the region.

== Public transport ==
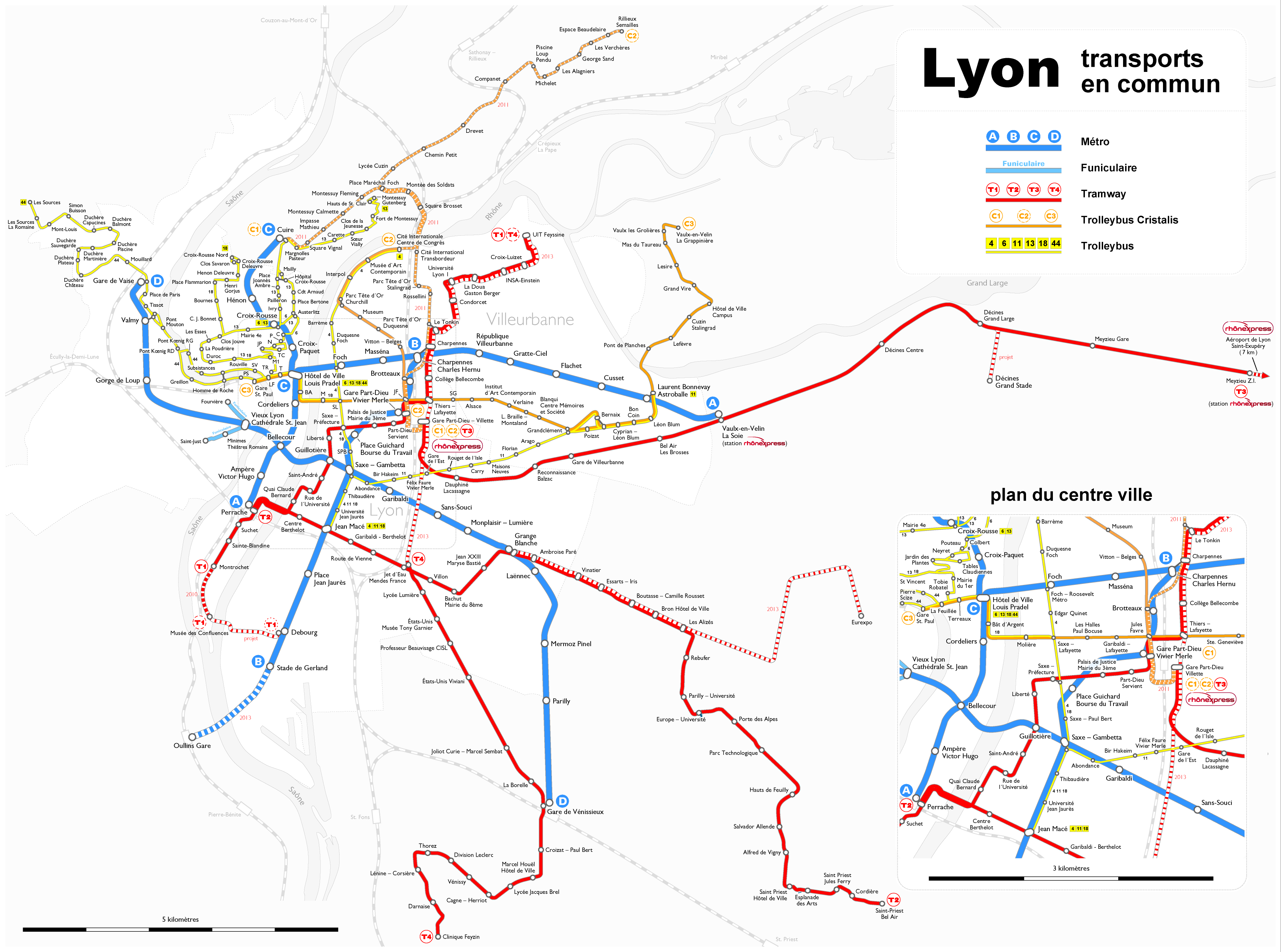
Metro, trams and buses in Lyon

12 transport authorities of public transport are implanted in Rhône-Alpes

- The Rhône-Alpes region
- The department of Ain
- The department of Isère
- The department of Loire
- The department of Rhône
- The department of Sytral
- Saint-Etienne Métropole
- The Port of Isère
- The community of Pays Viennois
- The community of Villefranche-sur-Saône
- The community of Bourg-en-Bresse
- The community of Grand Roanne

The three largest cities of Rhône-Alpes are equipped with streetcars and have a large bus network. The largest, Lyon, has four metro lines. Lyon and Saint-Étienne have kept their lines of trolley buses and, Saint-Etienne is one of the few cities in France to have retained its trams (in use since 1881).

Many cities also have their bus networks (Valencia the CTAV Chambéry the STAC, Villefranche-sur-Saône, Roanne, etc.). There are also networks of inter-departmental cars.

In winter, additional lines open to connect the valleys to ski resorts. This is the case between Grenoble and Chamrousse.

Finally, the airport Lyon Saint-Exupéry is accessible by regular shuttle bus from the major surrounding cities, including Lyon, Saint-Etienne, Grenoble and Chambéry. There are also links between Grenoble and Saint-Geoirs Grenoble and between Bouthéon Saint-Etienne and Saint-Etienne.

The Rhône-Alpes region is undergoing profound changes with regard to its rail network and many projects are being developed to the [Express Network of the urban area of Lyons, The Project of the East Rail Lyon, the Tram-train from the west Lyonnais.

== Public transport links in Lyonnais ==
=== Métro ===
The Lyon Metro, in Lyon, opened in 1978 and now consists of four lines. It is part of the Transports en Commun Lyonnais (TCL) system of public transport.

Like the SNCF, but unlike all other French metro systems (excluding the RER), Lyon metro trains run on the left, the result of an unrealised project to run the metro into the suburbs on existing railway lines. The loading gauge for lines A, B, and D is 2.90 m (9 ft 6.2 in), more generous than the average for metros in Europe. The loading gauge for line C is 2.78 m (9 ft 1.4 in). The total track length is 30 km (18.6 mi), 80% of which is underground.

The métro system consists of four lines, A-B-C-D, each identified on maps by different colours:

Line	Colour	Opened	Terminus
A	Red	1978	Perrache - Vaulx en Velin La Soie
B	Blue	1978	Charpennes - Stade de Gerland
C	Orange	1981	Hôtel de Ville - Cuire
D	Green	1991	Gare de Vaise - Gare de Vénissieux

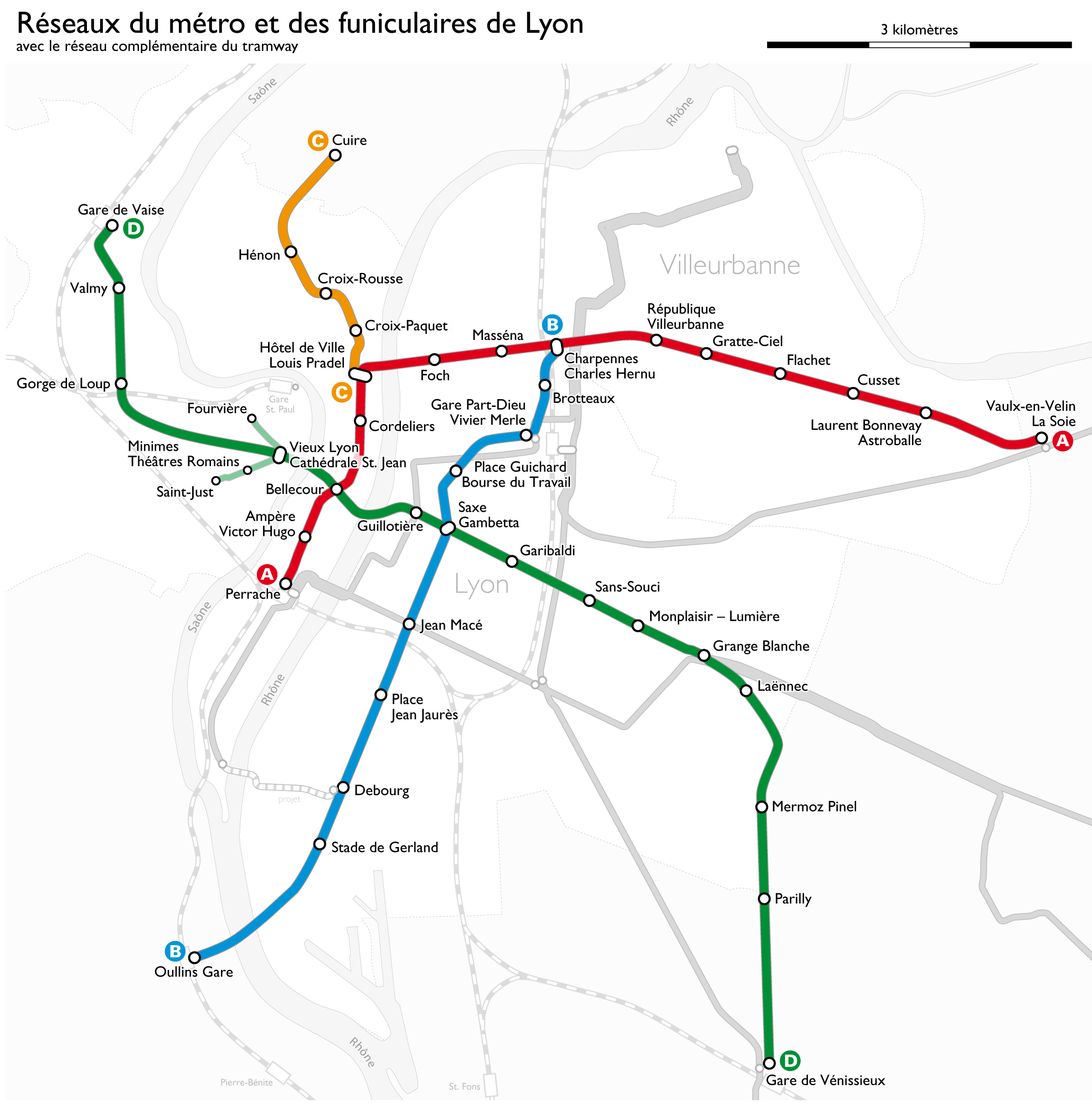
A map of the Lyon métro (with tram and trolleybus network in the background).

=== Lines A and B ===
Lines A (Perrache - Laurent Bonnevay) and B (Charpennes - Part-Dieu) were constructed using the cut-and-cover method, and went into service on May 2, 1978. Trains on both lines run on tyres rather than steel wheels.

Line B was extended to Jean Macé on September 9, 1981, then to Gerland on September 4, 2000. A further extension to Oullins is expected to open in 2013.

An extension to Vaulx-en-Velin La Soie on Line A opened in October 2007.

=== Line C ===
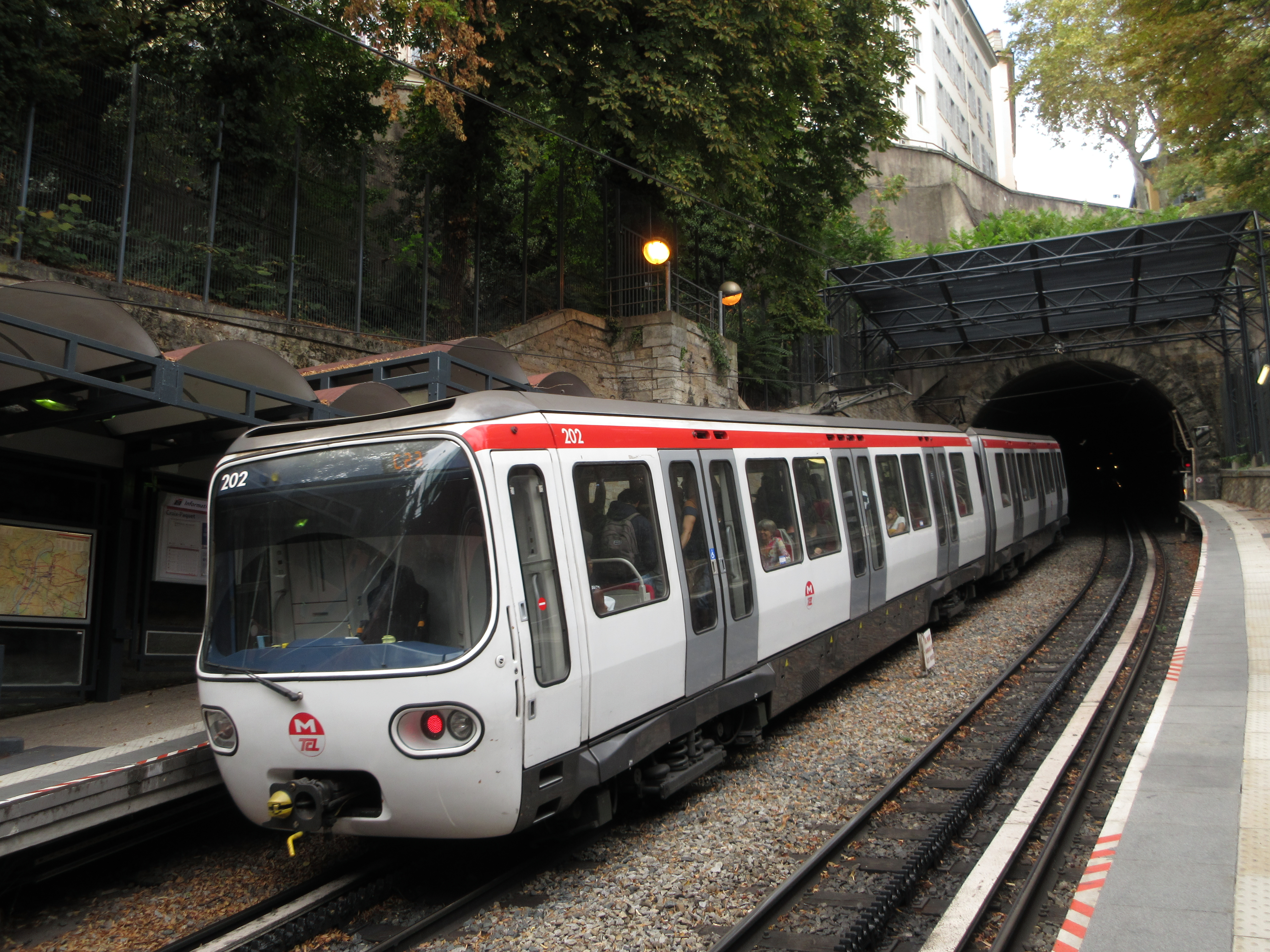
A rack-railway train of line C at the station Croix-Paquet

The Croix-Rousse-Croix-Paquet rack railway, which was refurbished in 1974, was integrated into the Metro in 1978 as line C, running from (Hôtel-de-Ville to Croix-Rousse). It was extended to Cuire on December 8, 1984.

The line was constructed using various methods; the incline rising through a deep tunnel, the portion on the flat at Croix-Rousse using cut-and-cover, while the section beyond Hénon runs on the surface. The Croix Paquet station claims to be the steepest metro station in Europe, with an incline of 17%.

=== Line D ===
Line D commenced operation under human control on September 4, 1991 between Gorge-de-Loup and Grange-Blanche. Rubber-tyred trains run automatically with no driver on board, controlled by a system known as MAGGALY (Métro Automatique à Grand Gabarit de l’Agglomération Lyonnaise). The line was extended to Gare de Vénissieux on December 11, 1992, at which time it switched to automatic operation. On April 28, 1997, it was extended again to Gare de Vaise.

Being the deepest of the lines in Lyon, it was constructed mainly using boring machines and passes under both rivers, the Rhône and the Saône. At 13 km (8.12 mi) long, it is also the longest of the lines in Lyon.

=== Operation ===
The Metro, like the rest of the local public transport system, is operated by SLTC - the Société lyonnaise de transports en commun (Lyon public transport company), under the TCL brand - Transports en commun lyonnais (Lyon public transport). It is operated on behalf of SYTRAL - the Syndicat de transports de l'agglomération lyonnaise (Lyon metropolitan transport syndicate), a Syndicat Mixte.

=== Tramways ===
==== Line T1 ====
Operates from 4:52 am to 12:27 am, maintained by the Centre de Maintenance de Saint-Priest - Porte des Alpes.

- Musée des Confluences extension to Musée des Confluences once the museum opens
- Montrochet
- Sainte-Blandine
- Suchet
- Perrache train station (transfers : Gare de Lyon-Perrache SNCF, Metro A, Tram T2, Bus 8 - 31 - 32 - 46 - 49 - 49D - 55 - 63 - 73 - 91 / Navette Presqu'Île - 96 - N4 - 101 - 105 - 125 - 175 / Airport shuttle - 182 - 184 - 185)
- Quai Claude Bernard
- Rue de l'Université (transfers : Bus 53)
- Saint-André
- Guillotière (transfers : Metro D, Bus 12 - 23)
- Liberté
- Saxe - Préfecture (transfers : Bus 4 - 18 - 23 - 28 - 99)
- Palais de Justice - Mairie du 3ème (transfers : Metro B at Place Guichard - Bourse du Travail, Bus 28 - 99)
- Part-Dieu - Servient (correspondances : Bus 28 - 99)
- *Part-Dieu (transfers: Part-DieuSNCF, Metro B, Bus C1 - 25 - 28 - 36 - 37 - 41 - 47 - 59 - 59E - 70 - 99 - 175 / Navette Gares Aéroport - Express Crémieu Bourgoin, Tram T3, Bus 198 - 296)
- Thiers - Lafayette (transfer : Bus 1)
- Collège Bellecombe (transfers : Bus 34)
- Charpennes - Charles Hernu (transfers : Metro B - Metro A, Bus 27 - 34 - 37 - 59 - 59E - 70)
- Le Tonkin
- Condorcet (transfer : Bus 38)
- Université Lyon I
- La Doua - Gaston Berger
- INSA - Einstein (transfer : Bus 69)
- Croix-Luizet
- IUT - Feyssine. P+R Tramway.

==== Line T2 ====
Operates from 4:55 am to 12:35 am, maintained by the Centre de Maintenance de Saint-Priest - Porte des Alpes.

- Perrache train station (transfers : Gare de Lyon-Perrache SNCF, Metro A, Tram T1, Bus 8 - 31 - 32 - 46 - 49 - 49D - 55 - 63 - 73 - 91 / Navette Presqu'Île - 96 - N4 - 101 - 105 - 125 - 175 / Airport shuttle - 182 - 184 - 185)
- Centre Berthelot
- Jean Macé (transfers : Metro B, Gare de Lyon-Jean Macé, Bus 4 - 11 - 18 - 35 - 47 - 53 - 96 - 175 / Navette Gares Aéroport)
- Garibaldi - Berthelot (transfers : Bus 12 - 35)
- Route de Vienne (transfers : Bus 12 - 35)
- Jet d'Eau - Mendès France (transfers: Bus 36 - 53 - 296)
- Villon
- Bachut - Mairie du 8ème (transfers: Bus 23 - 24 - 26)
- Jean XXIII - Maryse Bastié
- Grange-Blanche (transfers: Metro D, Bus 9 - 28 - 34 - 38 - 79 - 175 / Navette Gares Aéroport)
- Ambroise Paré (transfers: Bus 28 - 38)
- Vinatier
- Essarts - Iris
- Boutasse - Camille Rousset (transfers: Bus 81)
- Hôtel de Ville - Bron (transfers: Bus 9 - 24 - 79)
- Les Alizés
- Rebufer (transfers: Bus 52 - 78)
- Parilly - Université (transfers: Bus 81)
- Europe - Université
- Porte des Alpes (transfers: Bus 26 - 81). P+R Tramway
- Parc Technologique
- Hauts de Feuilly
- Salvador Allende
- Alfred de Vigny (transfers: Bus 62 - Zi1)
- Saint-Priest - Hôtel de Ville (transfers: Bus 50 - 53 - 54 - 62 - 94 - Zi1)
- Esplanade des arts (transfers: Bus 50 - 62)
- Jules Ferry (transfers Bus 50 - 53 - 94)
- Cordière
- Saint-Priest - Bel Air (transfers: Bus 50E - 53). P+R Tramway.

==== Line T3 ====
Operates from 4:27 am to 12:08 am, maintained by the Centre de Maintenance de Meyzieu.

Codenamed "LEA" (Ligne de L'Est de l'Agglomération), Line T3 runs along a portion of the former CFEL (Compagnie des chemins de fer de l'Est de Lyon) train line from the Gare de l'Est de Lyon to Saint-Genix-d'Aoste (via Crémieu, Jallieu et Montalieu).

- Gare Part-Dieu (transfers : Part-Dieu SNCF, Bus 198 - 296. Metro B, Tram T1, Bus C1 - 25 - 28 - 36 - 37 - 41 - 47 - 59 - 59E - 70 - 99 - 175 / Navette Gares Aéroport - Express Crémieu Bourgoin)
- Dauphiné - Lacassagne (transfers: Bus 25 - 28 - 34)
- Reconnaissance - Balzac (transfer: Bus 99)
- Gare de Villeurbanne (transfer: Bus 38). P+R Tramway
- Bel Air - Les Brosses (transfer: Bus 81)
- Vaulx-en-Velin - La Soie (transfer: Metro A, opening September 20, 2007, Bus 16 - 64 - 68 - Direct Eurexpo). P+R Métro et Tramway
- Décines - Centre (transfer: Bus 67). P+R Tramway
- Décines-Charpieu - Grand Large (transfers: Bus 7 - 16 - 67 - 85 - 95). P+R Tramway
- Meyzieu - Gare (transfer: Bus 67). P+R Tramway
- Meyzieu - ZI (transfer: Bus Zi2). P+R Tramway.

Line T3, which is 14.6 km long, runs largely on ballasted railroad track. It takes 23 minutes to go from Part-Dieu Villette to Meyzieu - ZI, and runs at a maximum speed of 70 km/h (60 km/h at intersections, of which 26 are equipped with crossing gates). 7 km run near residential areas and are equipped with a noise barrier.

==== Line T4 ====
Line T4 runs between Jet d'Eau and Cliniques Feyzin. A future extension is planned from Gare Part-Dieu to Jet d'Eau.

- Jet d'Eau - Mendès France (correspondance : Tram T2)
- Lycée Lumière
- États-Unis - Musée Tony Garnier
- Professeur Beauvisage - CISL
- États-Unis - Viviani
- Joliot Curie - Marcel Sembat
- La Borelle
- Gare de Vénissieux (transfer: Metro D). P+R Métro
- Croizat - Paul Bert
- Marcel Houël - Hôtel de Ville
- Lycée Jacques Brel
- Herriot - Cagne
- Vénissy
- Division Leclerc
- Maurice Thorez
- Lénine - Corsière
- Darnaise
- Hôpital Feyzin - Vénissieux.

==== Rhônexpress ====
Rhônexpress is an express line which will link Part-Dieu Villette to Saint-Exupéry airport, with intermediate stops at Vaulx-en-Velin – La Soie (transfer to Metro Line A) and Meyzieu ZI. It was scheduled to open in 2009. The Conseil général of the Rhône franchised the operation of this line for 30 years to Rhônexpress, a consortium including Vinci SA (28.2%), Veolia Transport (28.2%), Vossloh Infrastructure Service (4.2%), Cegelec Centre Est (2,8%) and the Caisse des dépôts et consignationsVille et transports - magazine, January 17, 2007.

=== Bus and trolleybus ===
TCL's bus network includes more than one hundred bus routes. Although greatly reduced compared to 1950, the Lyon trolleybus system is still the largest in France.

== Grenoble trams ==
Grenoble's tram network is 32 km long, and comprises five lines: lines A, B, C, D and E. Line A was opened in 1987, line B in 1990, line C entered into service in 2006, line D opened in 2007, and line E in 2014. A previous network of tramways existed in Grenoble between 1894 and 1952. Grenoble became the second French city to reintroduce the tramway, after Nantes.

The tramway network in Grenoble

== Rolling stock ==
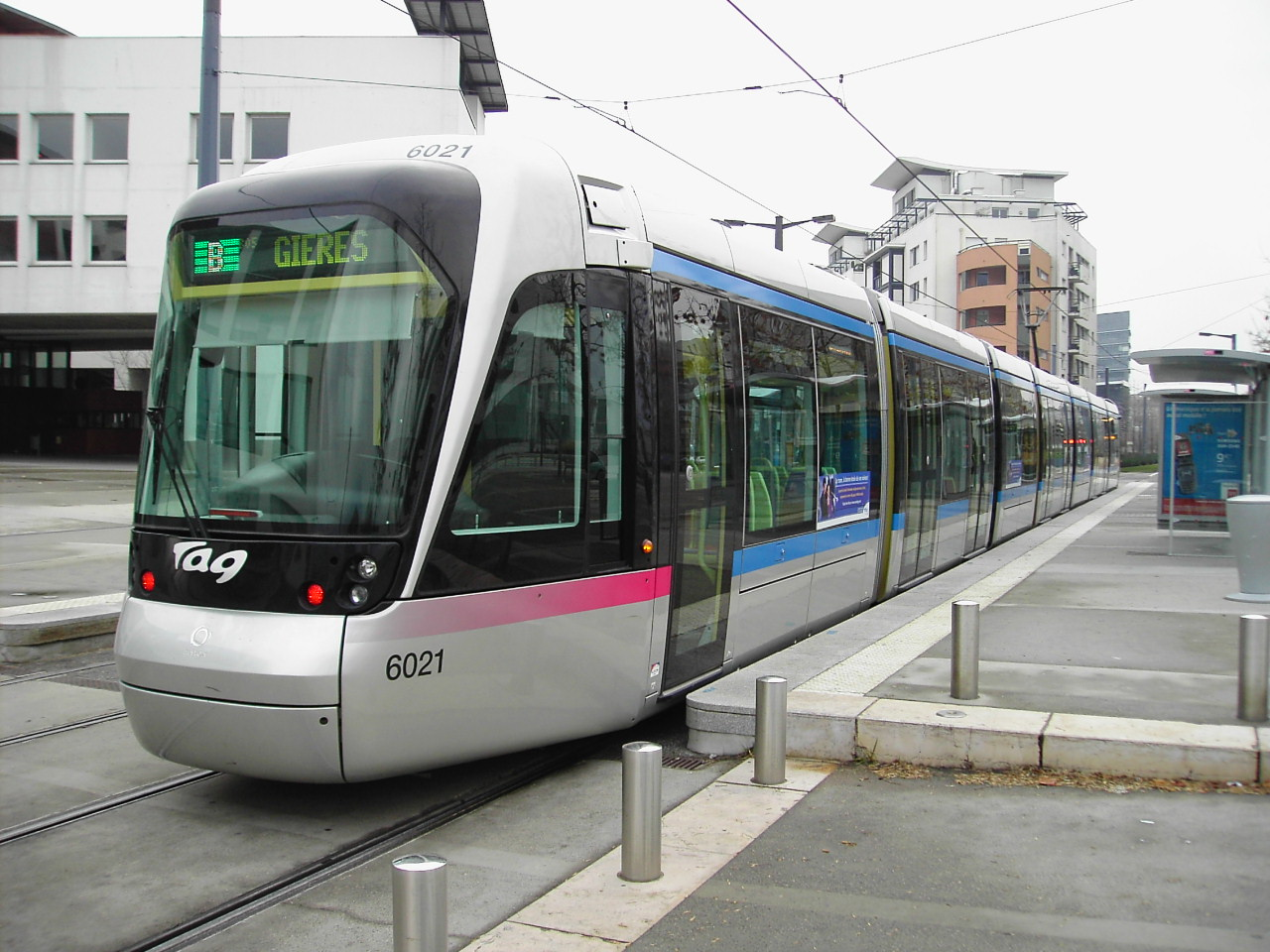
An Alstom Citadis tram at Cité International (line B terminus)

The Tramway de Grenoble is served by a total of 88 pieces of rolling stock. Of those, 58 are TFS trams and the other 35 put in service on the occasion of the opening of the B line extension and the C line are Alstom Citadis trams.

== Network ==
The network comprises 65 stations, 12 of which are shared by two lines. Line A has 29 stations, line B has 20 stations, line C has 19 stations, line D has 6 stations and line E has 17 stations. Projects for extensions are : line A extension (North: from Fontaine to Sassenage - South: from Échirolles to Pont-de-Claix); line D extensions (North: from Universités to Meylan - South: from Étienne Grappe to Grand'Place)

=== Bus lines ===
Urban Bus lines:

- 1 Grenoble Trois Dauphins - Claix Pont Rouge / Varces République.
- 3 Le Fontanil Croix de la Rochette / Saint-Égrève Rochepleine - Grenoble Chavant
- 9 La Tronche Grand Sablon - Meylan La Détourbe
- 11 Échirolles Comboire - Universités Biologie / Gières Universités IUT UFRAPS
- 2 Eybens Les Poulardes - Eybens La Grange du Chateau
- 13 Échirolles La Luire - Grenoble Trois Dauphins
- 16 La Tronche Cimetière du Grand Sablon / Grenoble Verdun Préfecture - Pont de Claix Flotibulle
- 17 Le Gua Les Saillants - Grenoble Trois Dauphins
- 21 Grenoble Verdun Préfecture - Gières Le Japin
- 23 Saint Martin d'Hères Neyrpic Belledonne - Grand'Place / Seyssins Le Prisme
- 26 Grand'Place / Fontaine Place du Néron - Universités Biologie
- 30 Grenoble Gare Europole / Saint Égrève Cap des H' - Saint Égrève Gare
- 31 Eybens Le Verderet - Meylan Maupertuis
- 32 Eybens Maisons Neuves - Corenc Montfleury / Meylan Lycée du Grésivaudan
- 33 Grenoble Petite Esplanade - Saint Martin d'Hères Les Alloves / Le Carina
- 34 Sassenage Le Château / Grenoble Polygone Scientifique - Poisat Prémol
- 41 Grenoble Docteur Martin - Domène Chenevières / Les Arnauds
- 51 Sassenage Les Engenières / L'Ovalie - Seyssinet-Pariset Cimetière / Seyssins Le Prisme
- 55 Sassenage Maladière - Seyssinet-Pariset Village
- 56 Fontaine La Poya - Veurey Mairie / Veurey Le Châtelard
- 58 Seyssins Les Nalettes - Claix Pont Rouge
- 6020 Grenoble Gare Routière - Meylan Lycée du Grésivaudan

== Society of transport in Greater Saint Etienne ==
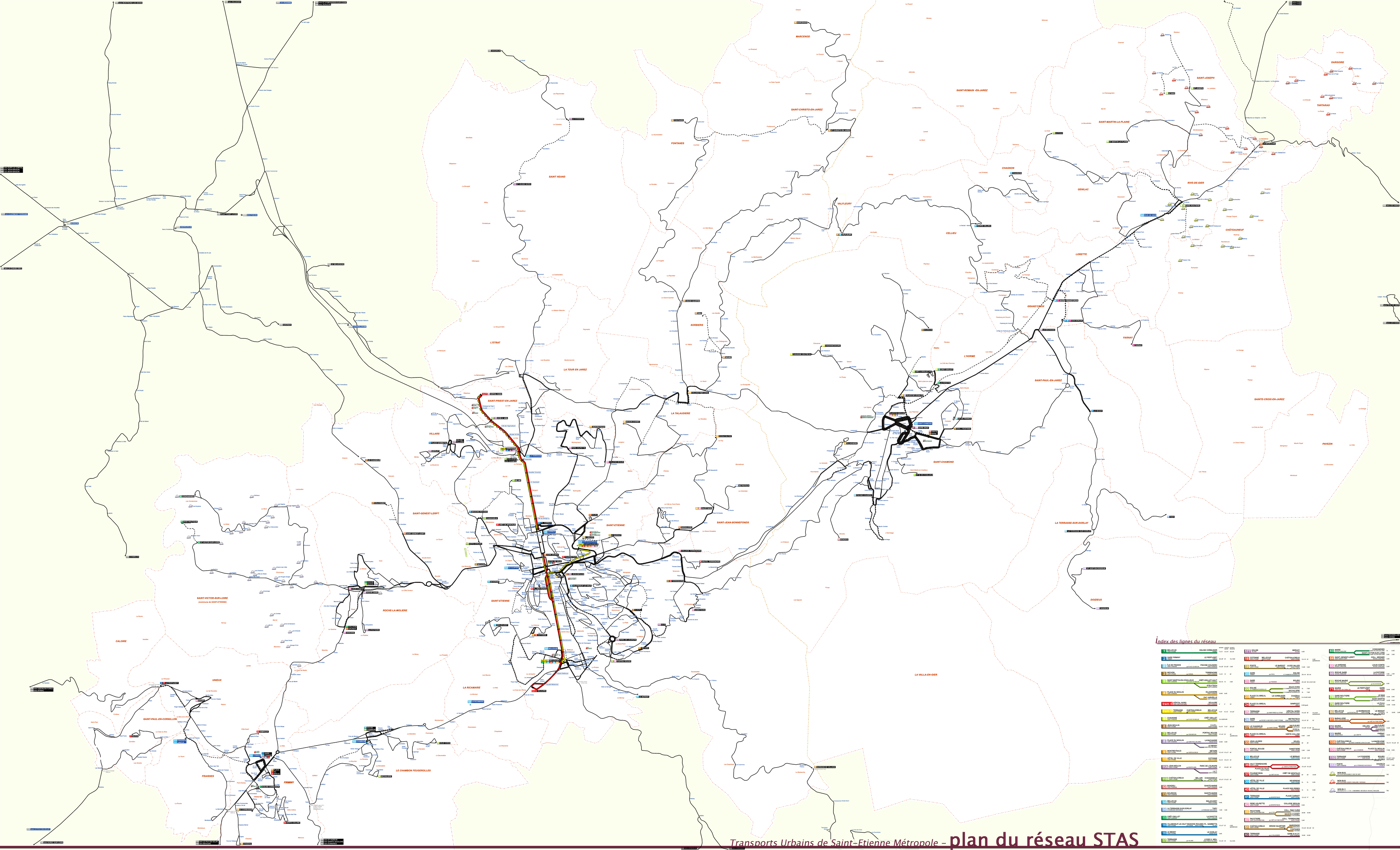
Map of bus lines

The Society of transport in Greater Saint Etienne (STAS) is the name of the company that manages and operates the various lines of trams, trolleybuses and buses of the Greater Saint Etienne. Organized and funded by Saint-Étienne Métropole, the society is responsible for transportation to the 43 municipalities. The network is structured around two lines of trams, trolley lines and 54 bus lines that run through the agglomeration.

== Airports ==
Rhône-Alpes has several airports, including many regular and seasonal flights to the ski districts.

The largest airport in the region is Lyon-Saint Exupéry Airport. It is located in the heart of the region, so that the main regional cities are within 100 km of the airport. The two other main airports are those of Grenoble and Chambéry. The airports of Grenoble and Chambéry are managed by the same company.

- Lyon-Saint Exupéry Airport: has the largest number of destinations (international) and the highest number of passengers.
- Grenoble-Isère Airport and Chambéry Airport: mainly used by low cost airlines. There is more traffic in winter because of the influx of tourists to the ski resorts, particularly from Great Britain, noted that the airport of Grenoble-Isère has become like Lyon, an international airport.
- Saint-Étienne - Bouthéon Airport
- Annecy - Haute-Savoie - Mont Blanc Airport

== Rhône-Alpes transport projects ==
- TER Rhône Alpes
- Réseau Express de l'Aire urbaine Lyonnaise
- Tramway de Grenoble
- Tramway de Saint-Étienne
- Rhônexpress
- Haut Bugey line
