= Urban Community of Lyon =

Coordinates: 45.7575°N 4.8540°E

- Former communauté urbaine

- The city (commune) of Lyon (in red) and 58 suburban communes (in blue) make up Grand Lyon
- Country: France
- Region: Auvergne-Rhône-Alpes
- Department: Rhône
- No. of communes: {{{nbcomm}}}
- Established: 1969
- Disbanded: 2015
- Area: 515.96 km^{2} (199.21 sq mi)
- Population (2009): 1,281,971
  - Density: 2,484.6/km^{2} (6,435.2/sq mi)

The Urban Community of Lyon (French: Communauté urbaine de Lyon), also known as Grand Lyon (i.e. "Greater Lyon") or by its former acronym COURLY, is the former intercommunal structure gathering the city of Lyon (France) and some of its suburbs. It was created in January 1969.

The Metropolis of Lyon replaced the Urban Community on 1 January 2015.

The Urban Community of Lyon encompasses only the core of the metropolitan area of Lyon. Communes further away from the centre of the metropolitan area have formed their own intercommunal structures, such as:

- Syndicate of New Agglomeration of L'Isle-d'Abeau (Syndicat d'agglomération nouvelle de l'Isle-d'Abeau): 38,769 inhabitants
- Community of Communes of the East of Lyon (Communauté de communes de l'Est Lyonnais): 27,706 inhabitants
- Community of Communes of the Garon Valley (Communauté de communes de la Vallée du Garon): 27,515 inhabitants

== Communes included in the Urban Community ==
The Urban Community originally comprised 55 communes. However, on 1 January 2007, two additional communes, Givors and Grigny, joined, bringing the total up to 57. These two communes are detached from the rest of the Urban Community, as Millery (the commune linking Grigny with Charly and Vernaison) and neighbouring villages refused to join the Urban Community. On 1 January 2011, Lissieu, joined and on 1 June 2014, Quincieux, bringing the total to 59.

The Communauté urbaine comprised the following communes:

- Albigny-sur-Saône
- Bron
- Cailloux-sur-Fontaines
- Caluire-et-Cuire
- Champagne-au-Mont-d'Or
- Charbonnières-les-Bains
- Charly
- Chassieu
- Collonges-au-Mont-d'Or
- Corbas
- Couzon-au-Mont-d'Or
- Craponne
- Curis-au-Mont-d'Or
- Dardilly
- Décines-Charpieu
- Écully
- Feyzin
- Fleurieu-sur-Saône
- Fontaines-Saint-Martin
- Fontaines-sur-Saône
- Francheville
- Genay
- Givors
- Grigny
- Irigny
- Jonage
- Limonest
- Lissieu
- Lyon
- Marcy-l'Étoile
- Meyzieu
- Mions
- Montanay
- La Mulatière
- Neuville-sur-Saône
- Oullins
- Pierre-Bénite
- Poleymieux-au-Mont-d'Or
- Quincieux
- Rillieux-la-Pape
- Rochetaillée-sur-Saône
- Saint-Cyr-au-Mont-d'Or
- Saint-Didier-au-Mont-d'Or
- Saint-Fons
- Sainte-Foy-lès-Lyon
- Saint-Genis-Laval
- Saint-Genis-les-Ollières
- Saint-Germain-au-Mont-d'Or
- Saint-Priest
- Saint-Romain-au-Mont-d'Or
- Sathonay-Camp
- Sathonay-Village
- Solaize
- Tassin-la-Demi-Lune
- La Tour-de-Salvagny
- Vaulx-en-Velin
- Vénissieux
- Vernaison
- Villeurbanne
