= Communes of the Lyon Metropolis =

The following is a list of the 58 communes of the Lyon Metropolis, France.

INSEE code	Postal code	Commune
69003	69250	Albigny-sur-Saône
69029	69500	Bron
69033	69270	Cailloux-sur-Fontaines
69034	69300	Caluire-et-Cuire
69040	69410	Champagne-au-Mont-d'Or
69044	69260	Charbonnières-les-Bains
69046	69390	Charly
69271	69680	Chassieu
69063	69660	Collonges-au-Mont-d'Or
69273	69960	Corbas
69068	69270	Couzon-au-Mont-d'Or
69069	69290	Craponne
69071	69250	Curis-au-Mont-d'Or
69072	69570	Dardilly
69275	69150	Décines-Charpieu
69081	69130	Écully
69276	69320	Feyzin
69085	69250	Fleurieu-sur-Saône
69087	69270	Fontaines-Saint-Martin
69088	69270	Fontaines-sur-Saône
69089	69340	Francheville
69278	69730	Genay
69091	69700	Givors
69096	69520	Grigny-sur-Rhône
69100	69540	Irigny
69279	69330	Jonage
69116	69760	Limonest
69117	69380	Lissieu
69123	69001/009	Lyon

INSEE code	Postal code	Commune
69127	69280	Marcy-l'Étoile
69282	69330	Meyzieu
69283	69780	Mions
69284	69250	Montanay
69142	69350	La Mulatière
69143	69250	Neuville-sur-Saône
69149	69310/600	Oullins-Pierre-Bénite
69153	69250	Poleymieux-au-Mont-d'Or
69163	69650	Quincieux
69286	69140	Rillieux-la-Pape
69168	69270	Rochetaillée-sur-Saône
69191	69450	Saint-Cyr-au-Mont-d'Or
69194	69370	Saint-Didier-au-Mont-d'Or
69202	69110	Sainte-Foy-lès-Lyon
69199	69190	Saint-Fons
69204	69230	Saint-Genis-Laval
69205	69290	Saint-Genis-les-Ollières
69207	69650	Saint-Germain-au-Mont-d'Or
69290	69800	Saint-Priest
69233	69270	Saint-Romain-au-Mont-d'Or
69292	69580	Sathonay-Camp
69293	69580	Sathonay-Village
69296	69360	Solaize
69244	69160	Tassin-la-Demi-Lune
69250	69890	La Tour-de-Salvagny
69256	69120	Vaulx-en-Velin
69259	69200	Vénissieux
69260	69390	Vernaison
69266	69100	Villeurbanne
