= Gregoire Moulin vs. Humanity =

2001 film by Artus de Penguern

- Theatrical release poster
- Directed by: Artus de Penguern
- Screenplay by: Artus de Penguern; Jérôme L'hotsky
- Produced by: Patrick Aumigny
- Starring: Artus de Penguern
- Cinematography: Vincent Mathias
- Edited by: Corinne Cahour; Christophe Marthoud; Claude-France Husson
- Music by: Benoît Pimont
- Production companies: LGM Productions; M6 Films; Rhône-Alpes Cinéma; SFP
- Distributed by: Universal Pictures (through United International Pictures)
- Release date: 24 October 2001
- Running time: 90 minutes
- Country: France
- Language: French
- Budget: $3.8 million
- Box office: $304.000

Gregoire Moulin vs. Humanity (original title: Grégoire Moulin contre l'humanité) is a 2001 French comedy film directed by Artus de Penguern.

== Cast ==
- Artus de Penguern : Grégoire Moulin
- Pascale Arbillot : Odile Bonheur
- Élisabeth Vitali : Hélène
- Antoine Duléry : Emmanuel Lacarrière
- Didier Bénureau : Jean-François
- Marie-Armelle Deguy : Solange
- Clovis Cornillac : Jacky
- Philippe Magnan : Jérôme
- Thomas Chabrol : Rodolphe
- Valérie Benguigui : Madame Moulin
- Philippe Hérisson : Monsieur Moulin
- Michel Bompoil : Adolf Hitler
- Patrick Lambert : Benito Mussolini
- Christian Charmetant : Cardinal Richelieu
- Fabrice Bagni : Charles Bovary
- Clara Bagni : Janine
- Anne Caillon : Catherine Lacarrière
- Serge Riaboukine : The taxi driver
- François Levantal : The vindictive
- Dominique Farrugia : The sport reporter
- Jean-Luc Couchard

== Production ==
Filming took place in the summer of 2000 in the Rhône region in Lyon, Villeurbanne, Irigny, Curis-au-Mont-d'Or, Bron and in Isère in Saint-Quentin-Fallavier.

== Accolades ==
| Year | Award | Category | Recipient | Result |
|---|---|---|---|---|
| 2002 | Avignon/New York Film Festival | Best Feature - France | Artus de Penguern | Won |
| 2002 | 27th César Awards | Best First Feature Film | Artus de Penguern | Nominated |
