= Franc-Lyonnais =

The Franc-Lyonnais (French pronunciation: [fʁɑ̃ ljɔnɛ]) was a province of France.

Located on a narrow strip of land on the left bank of the River Saône, it was composed of thirteen parishes, forming two parts :

- South part, from the north outer wall of Lyon :
  - Cuire-la-Croix-Rousse
  - Caluire
  - Fontaines-sur-Saône
  - Rochetaillée-sur-Saône
  - Fleurieu-sur-Saône
  - Vimy. From 1665, Vimy is chosen as capital and rechristened Neuville, in the honor of Camille de Neufville de Villeroy, lord of the parish and archbishop of Lyon
  - Genay, the first capital of the province
  - Bernoud
  - Saint-Jean-de-Thurigneux
- Northern part, embedded in the Principality of the Dombes:
  - Saint-Bernard-d'Anse, formerly Saint Barnard
  - Saint-Didier-de-Formans
  - Riottier

The Franc-Lyonnais probably originates from lands which used to belong to the church of Lyon. After being put under the protection of the count of Savoy, in 1398, the province is united to the kingdom of France around 1475, while remaining a province considered as foreign and within the lands of the German Empire. The Franc-Lyonnais strikes a deal in 1556 with the monarchy, guaranteeing its privileges, mainly the exemption from taxes. The political story of Franc-Lyonnais is one of the defense of its privileges, which the monarchy tries to take away during the 18th century.

When the French Revolution took place in 1789, the Franc-Lyonnais was split between the departements of Rhône-et-Loire and Ain.

== See also ==
- Lyonnais

== Bibliography ==
- Un pays et ses privilèges sous l'Ancien Régime : le Franc-Lyonnais / Alain Caraco. - Mémoire de maîtrise d'histoire moderne, Lyon II, 1983. This document is in storage at the Lyon Municipal Library.
