= Vernaison =

Commune in Auvergne-Rhône-Alpes, France

- Commune
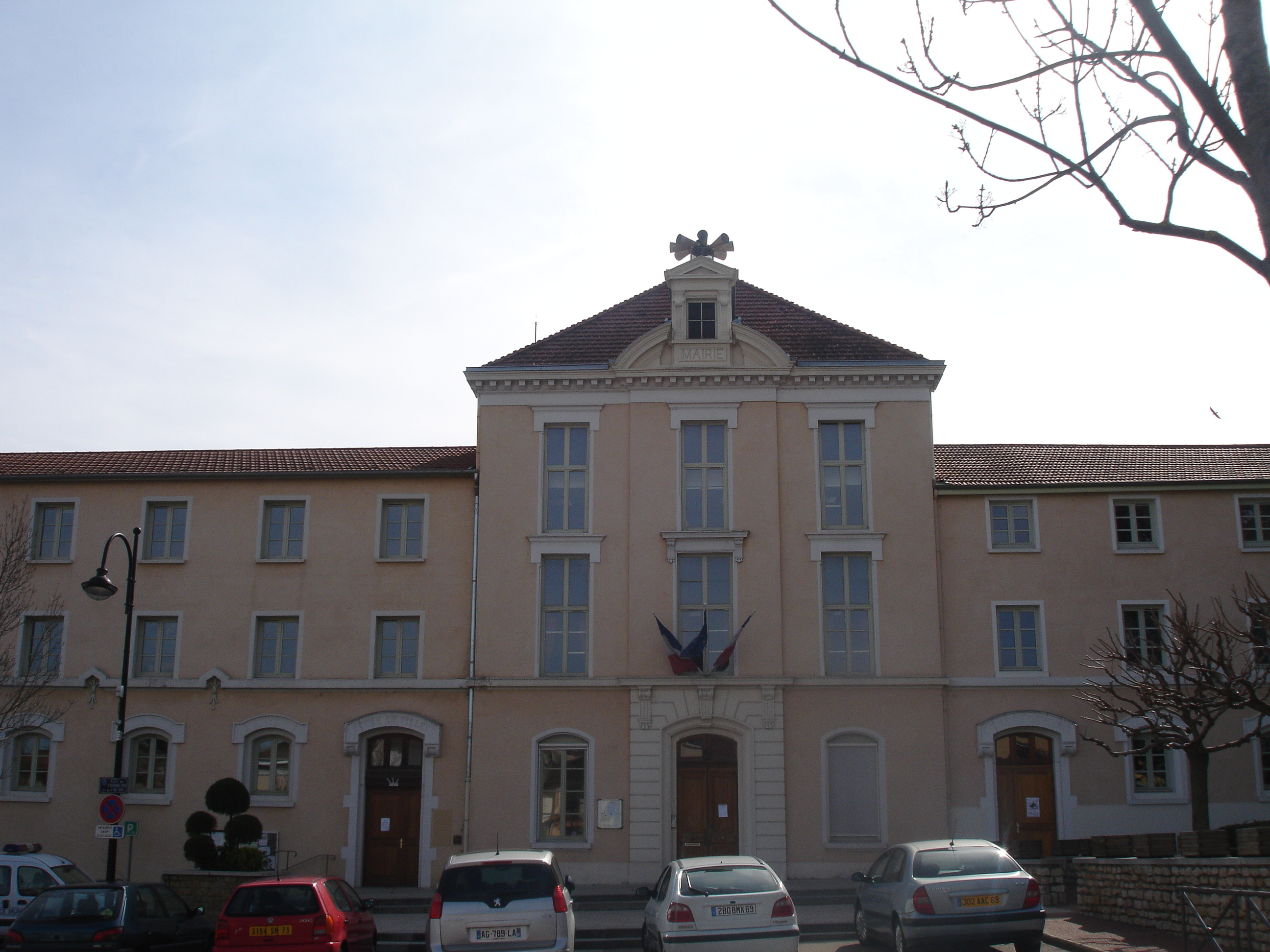
- The town hall in Vernaison

- Coat of arms
- Location of Vernaison
- Location within France Location within Auvergne-Rhône-Alpes
- Coordinates: 45°38′53″N 4°48′40″E
- Country: France
- Region: Auvergne-Rhône-Alpes
- Metropolis: Lyon Metropolis
- Arrondissement: Lyon

Government
  - Mayor (2020–2026): Julien Vuillemard
- Area^{1}: 4.03 km^{2} (1.56 sq mi)
- Elevation: 161 m (528 ft)
- Highest elevation: 280 m (920 ft)
- Lowest elevation: 155 m (509 ft)
- Population (2023): 5,210
  - Density: 1,290/km^{2} (3,350/sq mi)
- Time zone: UTC+01:00 (CET)
  - Summer (DST): UTC+02:00 (CEST)
- INSEE/Postal code: 69260 /69390
- ^{1} French Land Register data, which excludes lakes, ponds, glaciers > 1 km^{2} (0.386 sq mi or 247 acres) and river estuaries.

Vernaison (French pronunciation: [vɛʁnɛzɔ̃]) is a commune in the Metropolis of Lyon in Auvergne-Rhône-Alpes region in eastern France.

== Geography ==
The commune is located south of Lyon, on the right bank of the Rhône, facing several islands in the river.

== Population ==
Historical population
Year	Pop.	±% p.a.
1968	1,995	—
1975	3,250	+7.22%
1982	3,373	+0.53%
1990	4,072	+2.38%
1999	4,000	−0.20%
2007	4,365	+1.10%
2012	4,521	+0.70%
2017	4,998	+2.03%
2023	5,210	+0.69%
Source: INSEE

Inhabitants of Vernaison are called Vernaisonnais in French.

== History ==
- Bronze Age – Along the Rhône bronze casters settle. Several remains have been found south of Lyon. In the 19th century, the trésor de Vernaison was discovered, the first indication of bronze casting. Nowadays this treasure is exhibited at the Gallo-Roman Museum of Lyon.
- 1153 – Vernaison (Veyrneyson) was noted for the first time in a written document. The etymology of the village name is not well known, although one can distinguish the name Verne ("alder"), a tree common in wet environments.
- 1213 – The village is founded by Johan Rufus, the abbot of Ainay Abbey (Lyon)
- 13th century – Toll is exacted at the tour de Genetière (nowadays the Tour de Millery)
- 14th century – Houses are constructed along the river of a combination of adobe and pebbles (pisé et galets).
- 15th century – Wine grapes are grown
- 1439 – Benedictine monks quit the village and cede it to inhabitants of Lyon.
- 1787 – A cloth factory is established by three Swiss coming from Geneva.
- 1887 – One of the first associations for a water sport Joute nautique (still practised today) is founded.
- 1995 – A program is started to revalue the side arms of the Rhône.
- 2003 – A kindergarten is opened

The parish of Vernaison was a dependency of Charly until 1791.

== Economy ==
Vernaison houses traditional enterprises and shops as well as advanced technology firms.

The market is held Wednesday morning and Saturday morning.

== Transportation ==
Vernaison is linked with

- Lyon (Place Bellecour) by bus line 15 of the TCL. This line is one of the oldest of Grand Lyon, dating from 1906, and stopping in Vernaison from 1980 on.
- Givors by bus line 215 (bus) of the TCL; this line was established in September 2007.
- Lyon Perrache by the railway line of the SNCF Saint-Étienne/Lyon.

== See also ==
- Communes of the Metropolis of Lyon
