= Pierre-Paul-Etienne Alombert-Goget =

Pierre-Paul-Etienne Alombert-Goget (January 17, 1888 – September 12, 1972) was a French Divisional general during the Interwar Period and Chief of Staff of the 1st Army during the Battle of France.

== Biography ==
Pierre was born in the 7th arrondissement of Paris, France, on January 17, 1888. He married Julia Marcelle Yvan on December 30, 1912. He died on September 12, 1972, in Saint-Cyr-au-Mont-d'Or, and was buried the 14th of the same month, at the Loyasse Cemetery in Lyon.
