= Genay, Metropolis of Lyon =

Genay
- Commune
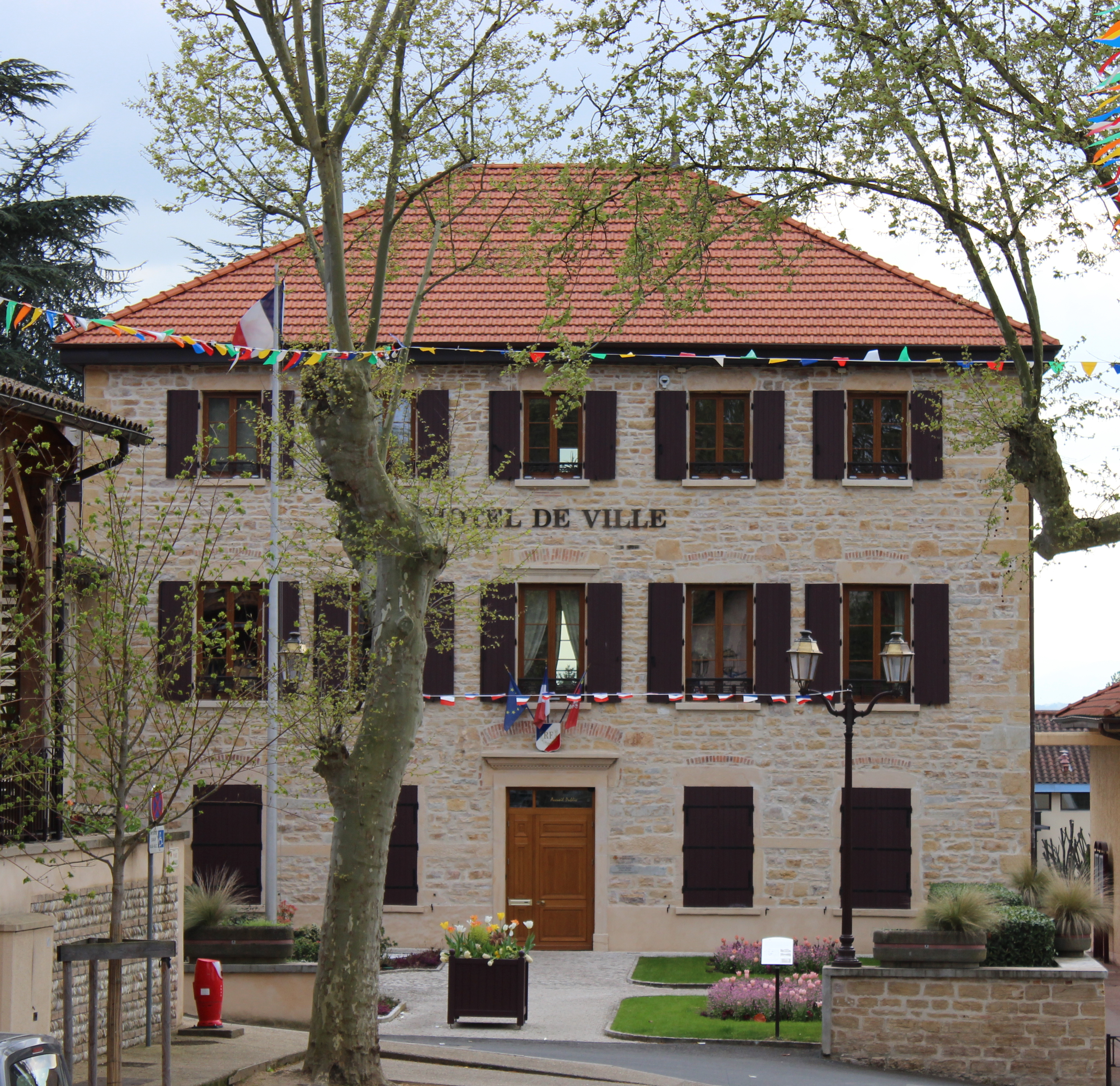
- The town hall of Genay

- Coat of arms
- Location of Genay
- Location within France Location within Auvergne-Rhône-Alpes
- Coordinates: 45°53′51″N 4°50′30″E
- Country: France
- Region: Auvergne-Rhône-Alpes
- Metropolis: Lyon Metropolis
- Arrondissement: Lyon

Government
  - Mayor (2020–2026): Valérie Giraud
- Area^{1}: 8.49 km^{2} (3.28 sq mi)
- Elevation: 200 m (660 ft)
- Highest elevation: 301 m (988 ft)
- Lowest elevation: 167 m (548 ft)
- Population (2023): 5,585
  - Density: 658/km^{2} (1,700/sq mi)
- Time zone: UTC+01:00 (CET)
  - Summer (DST): UTC+02:00 (CEST)
- INSEE/Postal code: 69278 /69730
- ^{1} French Land Register data, which excludes lakes, ponds, glaciers > 1 km^{2} (0.386 sq mi or 247 acres) and river estuaries.

Genay (French pronunciation: [ʒənɛ]) is a commune in the Metropolis of Lyon in Auvergne-Rhône-Alpes region in eastern France.

== Geography ==
Genay is located about 20 kilometres north of Lyon.

=== Surrounding communes ===
- In the Metropolis of Lyon:
  - Montanay
  - Neuville-sur-Saône
  - Saint-Germain-au-Mont-d'Or
- In the department of Ain:
  - Civrieux
  - Massieux

== Demographics ==
Historical population
Year	Pop.	±% p.a.
1962	1,458	—
1968	1,825	+3.81%
1975	2,359	+3.73%
1982	3,544	+5.99%
1990	4,029	+1.62%
1999	4,657	+1.62%
2007	4,802	+0.38%
2012	5,181	+1.53%
2017	5,470	+1.09%
2023	5,585	+0.35%
Source: Cassini and INSEE

== History ==
Genay was the capital of former Franc-Lyonnais. Genay left the department of Ain to join the department of Rhône in 1968, and became a member of the Urban Community of Lyon in 1969. On 1 January 2015 Genay left the department of Rhône to join the Metropolis of Lyon.
