= Laurent Bonnevay =

French politician (1870–1957)

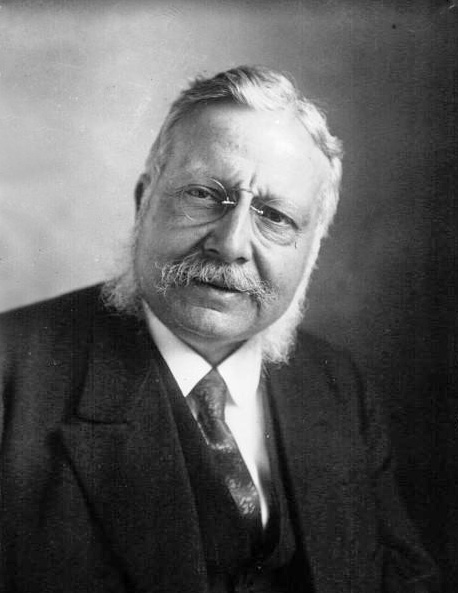
- Laurent Bonnevay, deputy of the Rhône (1929)

Member of the French Chamber of Deputies
- In office 22 April 1902 – 1924
- Constituency: Villefranche-sur-Saône

Senator of France
- In office 13 April 1924 – 1927
- Constituency: Rhône

Member of the French Chamber of Deputies
- In office 22 April 1928 – 1942
- Constituency: Rhône

Personal details
- Born: 28 July 1870 Saint-Didier-au-Mont-d'Or, France
- Died: 28 May 1957 (aged 86) Lyon, France

Laurent Bonnevay (French pronunciation: [lɔʁɑ̃ bɔnvɛ]; 28 July 1870 – 28 May 1957) was a French centrist lawyer and politician during the Third and Fourth Republics who was a member first of the Republican Federation and then of the Democratic Republican Alliance centre-right groups.

== Life ==
He was one of the few non-communists to refuse the Munich Agreement of 1938, along with some militants from Action Française. He was notably Garde des Sceaux in Aristide Briand's government (January 16, 1921 - January 15, 1922) and president of the investigative commission from February 6, 1934. He was one of 'The Vichy 80' who refused to vote full powers to Marshal Philippe Pétain in 1940.

Although born in Saint-Didier-au-Mont-d'Or in his mother's family home and with a father originating from the canton of Lamure-sur-Azergues (where he built his political career), his wife's family had a house in Dardilly in which he frequently stayed (including the whole of the Second World War).

== Posts ==
- Municipal councillor of Lyon (1900–1904).
- Conseiller général of the canton of Lamure (1902–1940 and 1945–1957).
- President of the conseil général of the Rhône (1934–1940 and 1951–1957).
- Député for the second district (circonscription) of Villefranche (1902–1924 and 1928–1941).
- Senator for the Rhône (1924–1928).
- Member of the Assemblée Constituante Provisoire (Provisional Consultative Assembly) (1944–1945).

== Sources ==
- This page is a translation of its French counterpart.
