= Albigny-sur-Saône =

- Commune
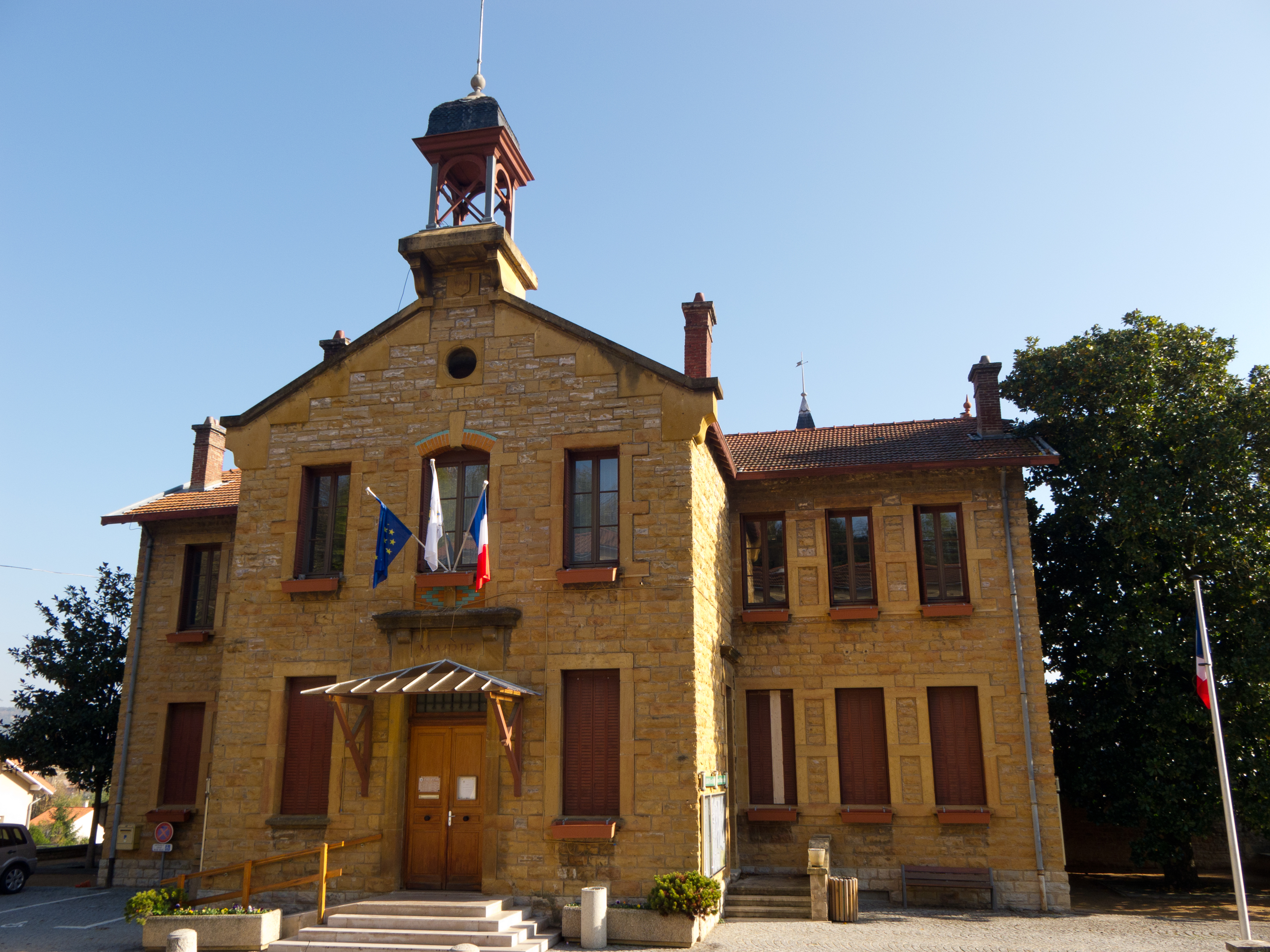
- The town hall

- Coat of arms
- Location of Albigny-sur-Saône
- Location within France Location within Auvergne-Rhône-Alpes
- Coordinates: 45°51′56″N 4°49′56″E
- Country: France
- Region: Auvergne-Rhône-Alpes
- Metropolis: Lyon Metropolis
- Arrondissement: Lyon

Government
  - Mayor (2020–2026): Yves Chipier
- Area^{1}: 2.57 km^{2} (0.99 sq mi)
- Elevation: 175 m (574 ft)
- Highest elevation: 411 m (1,348 ft)
- Lowest elevation: 167 m (548 ft)
- Population (2023): 3,057
  - Density: 1,190/km^{2} (3,080/sq mi)
- Time zone: UTC+01:00 (CET)
  - Summer (DST): UTC+02:00 (CEST)
- INSEE/Postal code: 69003 /69250
- ^{1} French Land Register data, which excludes lakes, ponds, glaciers > 1 km^{2} (0.386 sq mi or 247 acres) and river estuaries.

Albigny-sur-Saône (French pronunciation: [albiɲi syʁ son], literally Albigny on Saône, before 1962: Albigny) is a commune in the Metropolis of Lyon in the Auvergne-Rhône-Alpes region in central-eastern France. The town was founded thousands of years ago in Roman times, probably around 40 BC over sacred ground of the Gallic Segusiavi tribe, and likely re-named after Clodius Albinus in the early 3rd century AD.

An affluent community the town has two schools, including a Montessori bilingual French-English school, a public library, a church of the Roman Catholic Archdiocese of Lyon, a 12th-century castle, two doctors, two dentists, a pharmacy, and a small shopping centre.

== Surrounding communes ==
- Curis-au-Mont-d'Or
- Neuville-sur-Saône
- Couzon-au-Mont-d'Or

== History ==
On 1 January 2015 Albigny-sur-Saône left the department of Rhône to join the Metropolis of Lyon.

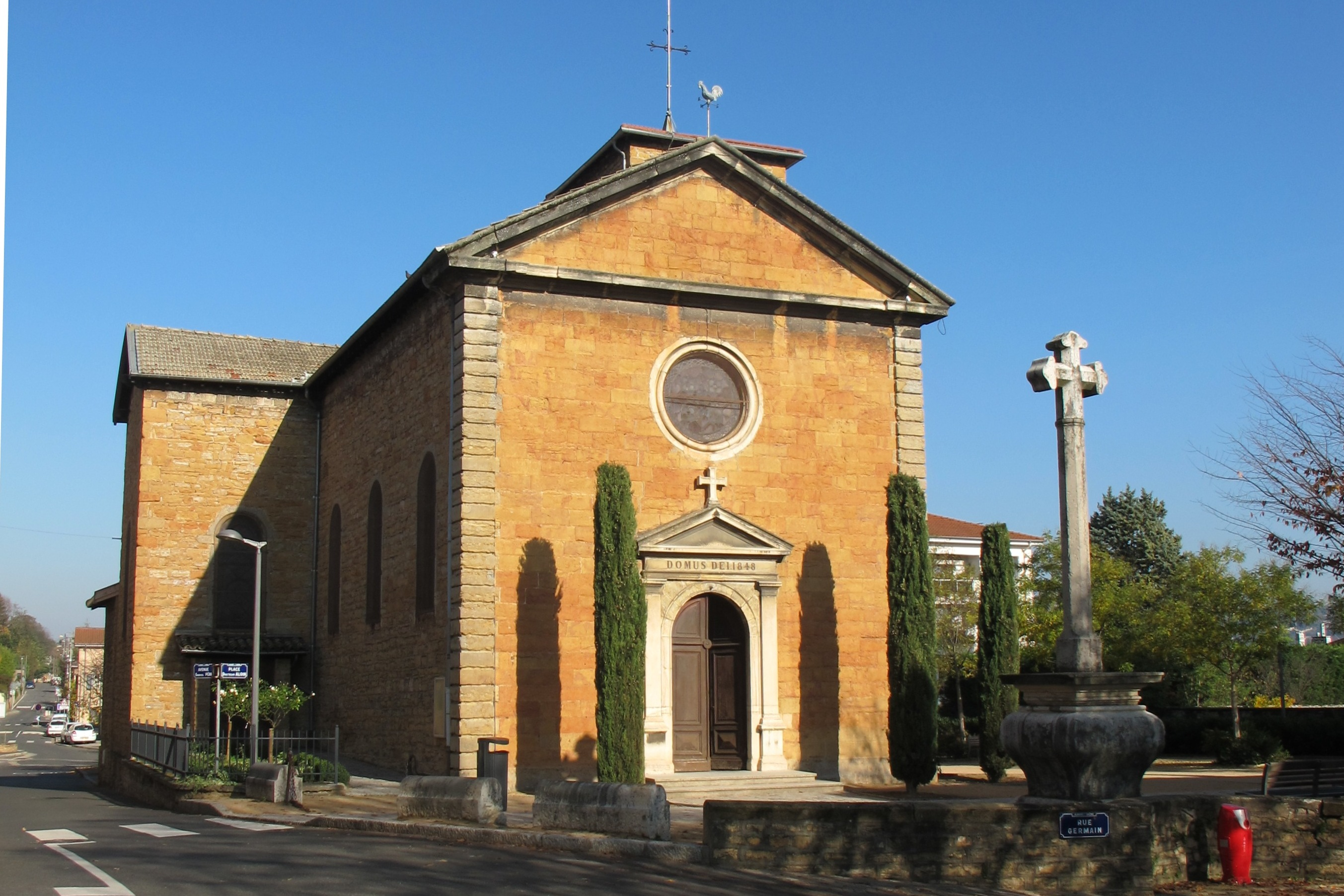
The church of the Nativity of Our Lady of Albigny-sur-Saône

== Population ==
Historical population
Year	Pop.	±% p.a.
1968	2,506	—
1975	2,405	−0.59%
1982	2,653	+1.41%
1990	2,836	+0.84%
1999	2,673	−0.66%
2007	2,744	+0.33%
2012	2,793	+0.35%
2017	2,880	+0.62%
2023	3,057	+1.00%
Source: INSEE

== See also ==
Lyon Metropolis
