= Limonest =

- Commune
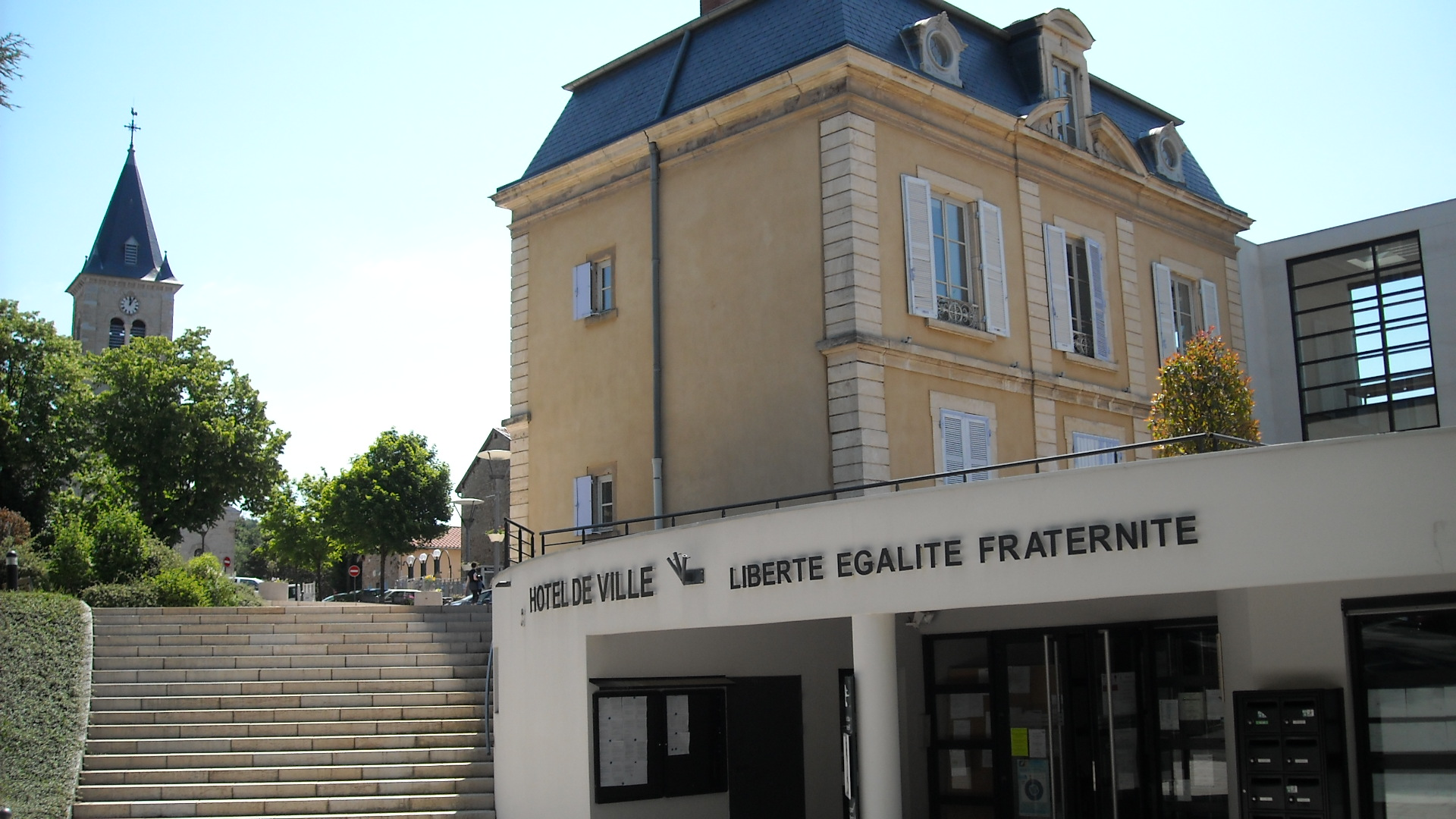
- City Hall

- Coat of arms
- Location of Limonest
- Location within France Location within Auvergne-Rhône-Alpes
- Coordinates: 45°50′13″N 4°46′19″E
- Country: France
- Region: Auvergne-Rhône-Alpes
- Metropolis: Lyon Metropolis
- Arrondissement: Lyon

Government
  - Mayor (2020–2026): Max Vincent
- Area^{1}: 8.39 km^{2} (3.24 sq mi)
- Elevation: 450 m (1,480 ft)
- Highest elevation: 603 m (1,978 ft)
- Lowest elevation: 275 m (902 ft)
- Population (2023): 4,012
  - Density: 478/km^{2} (1,240/sq mi)
- Time zone: UTC+01:00 (CET)
  - Summer (DST): UTC+02:00 (CEST)
- INSEE/Postal code: 69116 /69760
- ^{1} French Land Register data, which excludes lakes, ponds, glaciers > 1 km^{2} (0.386 sq mi or 247 acres) and river estuaries.

Limonest (French pronunciation: [limɔnɛ]) is a commune in the Metropolis of Lyon in Auvergne-Rhône-Alpes region in eastern France.

== Geography ==
Limonest is located 10 km (6 mi) northwest of Lyon in the Monts d'Or hills.

== Population ==
Historical population
Year	Pop.	±% p.a.
1968	1,751	—
1975	1,941	+1.48%
1982	2,131	+1.34%
1990	2,459	+1.81%
1999	2,733	+1.18%
2007	3,011	+1.22%
2012	3,418	+2.57%
2017	3,664	+1.40%
2023	4,012	+1.52%
Source: INSEE

Its people are known as the Limonois in French.

== See also ==
- Communes of the Metropolis of Lyon
