= Lissieu =

- Commune
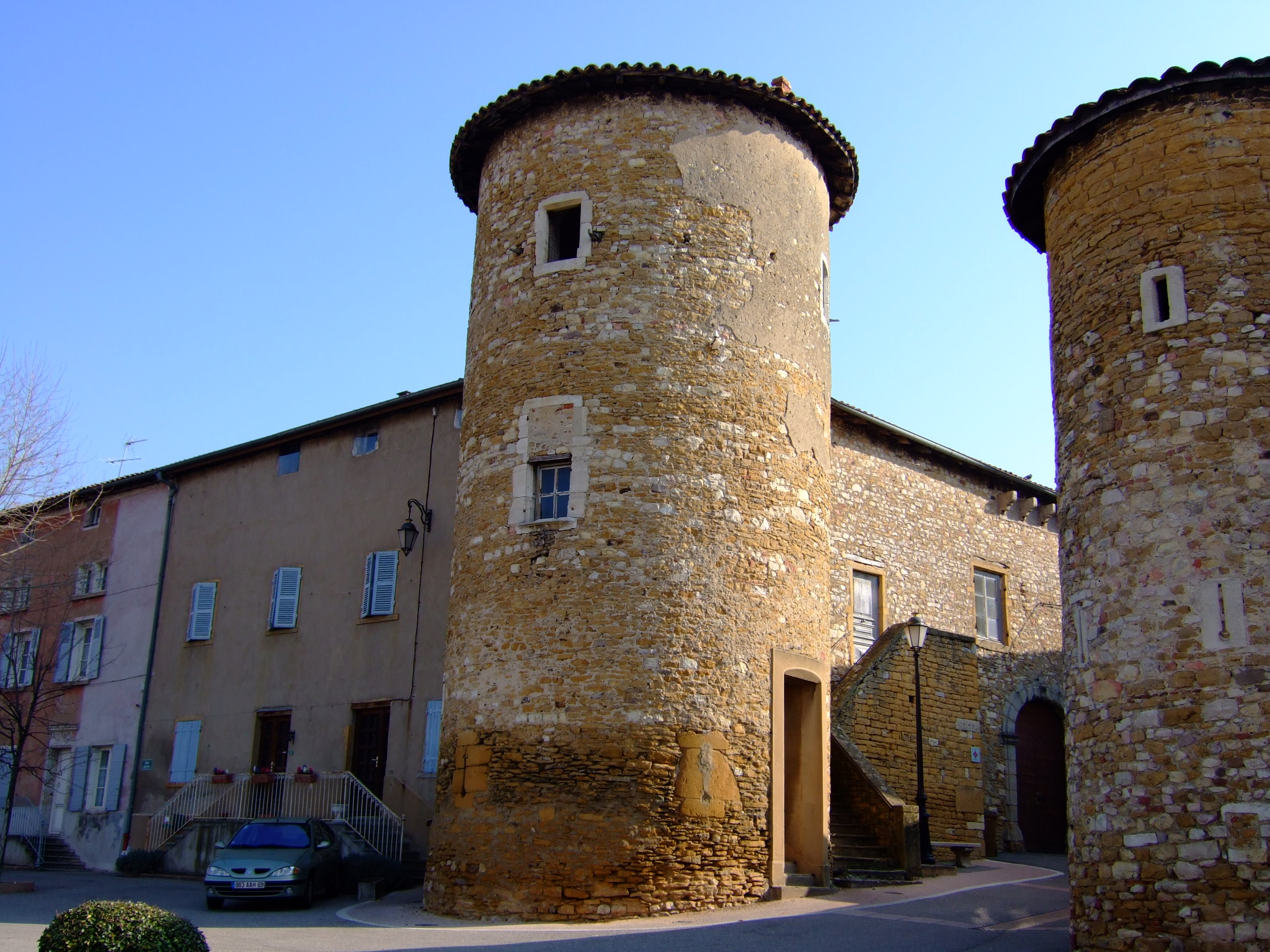
- The château of the counts of Lissieu

- Coat of arms
- Location of Lissieu
- Location within France Location within Auvergne-Rhône-Alpes
- Coordinates: 45°51′56″N 4°44′35″E
- Country: France
- Region: Auvergne-Rhône-Alpes
- Metropolis: Lyon Metropolis
- Arrondissement: Lyon

Government
  - Mayor (2020–2026): Charlotte Grange
- Area^{1}: 5.66 km^{2} (2.19 sq mi)
- Elevation: 220 m (720 ft)
- Highest elevation: 367 m (1,204 ft)
- Lowest elevation: 199 m (653 ft)
- Population (2023): 3,181
  - Density: 562/km^{2} (1,460/sq mi)
- Time zone: UTC+01:00 (CET)
  - Summer (DST): UTC+02:00 (CEST)
- INSEE/Postal code: 69117 /69380
- ^{1} French Land Register data, which excludes lakes, ponds, glaciers > 1 km^{2} (0.386 sq mi or 247 acres) and river estuaries.

Lissieu (French pronunciation: [lisjø]) is a commune in the Metropolis of Lyon in Auvergne-Rhône-Alpes region in eastern France.

== Population ==
Historical population
Year	Pop.	±% p.a.
1968	597	—
1975	734	+3.00%
1982	2,091	+16.13%
1990	2,535	+2.44%
1999	3,090	+2.22%
2007	3,234	+0.57%
2012	3,072	−1.02%
2017	3,122	+0.32%
2023	3,181	+0.31%
Source: INSEE

== See also ==
- Communes of the Metropolis of Lyon
