= Craponne =

Craponne Crapona (Arpitan)
- Commune
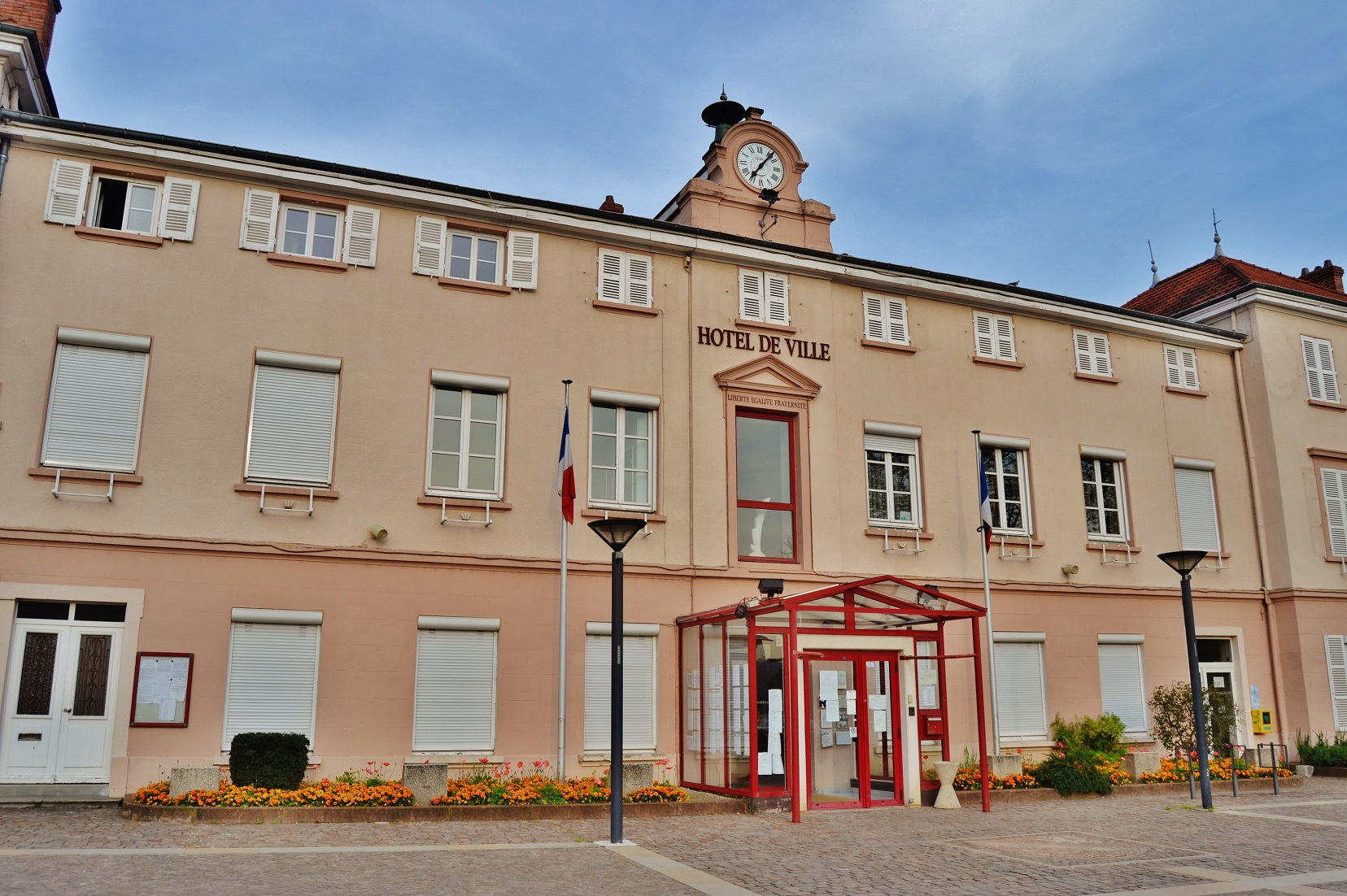
- The town hall of Craponne

- Coat of arms
- Location of Craponne
- Location within France Location within Auvergne-Rhône-Alpes
- Coordinates: 45°44′N 4°43′E
- Country: France
- Region: Auvergne-Rhône-Alpes
- Metropolis: Lyon Metropolis
- Arrondissement: Lyon

Government
  - Mayor (2020–2026): Sandrine Chadier (DVD)
- Area^{1}: 4.62 km^{2} (1.78 sq mi)
- Elevation: 285 m (935 ft)
- Highest elevation: 305 m (1,001 ft)
- Lowest elevation: 213 m (699 ft)
- Population (2023): 12,084
  - Density: 2,620/km^{2} (6,770/sq mi)
- Demonym: Craponnois
- Time zone: UTC+01:00 (CET)
  - Summer (DST): UTC+02:00 (CEST)
- INSEE/Postal code: 69069 /69290
- Website: www.mairie-craponne.fr
- ^{1} French Land Register data, which excludes lakes, ponds, glaciers > 1 km^{2} (0.386 sq mi or 247 acres) and river estuaries.

Craponne (French pronunciation: [kʁapɔn]; Arpitan: Crapona) is a commune in the Metropolis of Lyon in the Auvergne-Rhône-Alpes region in central-eastern France. It is a western suburb of Lyon, on the border with the Rhône department.

== History ==
The name of the commune derives from crappe, which means quagmire in Old French.

From 1800 to 1960, Craponne was the capital of the launderers of Lyon. The museum of the Craponne Laundry (opened in 2004) traces the history of launderers, washerwomen and ironers, from washing in the river Yzeron to the modern industrial laundry.

The commune of Craponne was founded on 15 February 1836 when it separated from the mother-commune of Grézieu-la-Varenne. The first mayor, François Boirivent, was appointed on 8 May 1837 and a town hall and a school were opened. According to the first census in 1833, which was made especially to prepare for the separation, Craponne had only 874 inhabitants. On the first map established during this separation, the buildings are shown as sparse, with less than 150 houses or farms built on the 464 hectares of the town. Fifty years later, in 1886, the population of Craponne had doubled to nearly 1900 inhabitants. This increase was due to the boom in laundry, the proximity of the commune to Lyon, and the opening in 1886 of the railway linking Lyon St-Just to Vaugneray which crossed Craponne.

Craponne was a member of the intercommunal structure surrounding the city of Lyon, known as Greater Lyon (Grand Lyon). This structure was replaced on 1 January 2015, and so Craponne is now part of the new territorial collectivity of the Lyon Metropolis.

== Population ==
Historical population
Year	Pop.	±% p.a.
1968	3,423	—
1975	4,592	+4.29%
1982	5,536	+2.71%
1990	7,048	+3.06%
1999	8,002	+1.42%
2007	8,727	+1.09%
2012	10,165	+3.10%
2017	11,067	+1.71%
2023	12,084	+1.48%
Source: INSEE

== Places and monuments ==
Two pillars from the Roman aqueduct of Yzeron, sometimes called the Craponne Aqueduct, remain standing and these are listed as an historical monument. The aqueduct was one of the four ancient aqueducts of Lyon, serving the ancient Roman city of Lugdunum. It owes its name to the fact that it draws water from the watershed of the Yzeron river, which is a tributary of the Rhône.
