= Jonage =

- Commune
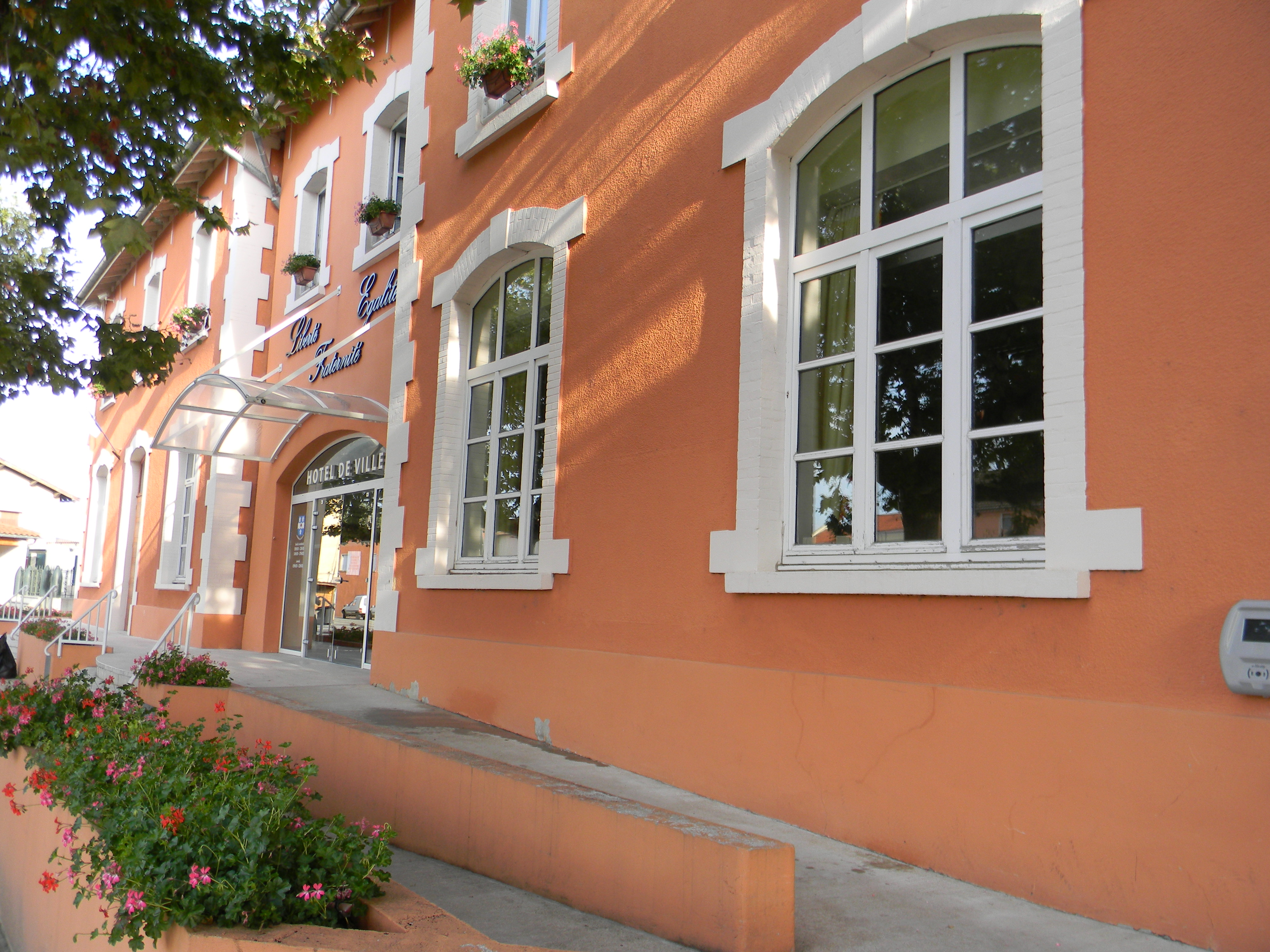
- The town hall in Jonage

- Coat of arms
- Location of Jonage
- Location within France Location within Auvergne-Rhône-Alpes
- Coordinates: 45°47′49″N 5°02′49″E
- Country: France
- Region: Auvergne-Rhône-Alpes
- Metropolis: Lyon Metropolis
- Arrondissement: Lyon

Government
  - Mayor (2020–2026): Lucien Barge
- Area^{1}: 12.11 km^{2} (4.68 sq mi)
- Elevation: 193 m (633 ft)
- Highest elevation: 225 m (738 ft)
- Lowest elevation: 175 m (574 ft)
- Population (2023): 6,144
  - Density: 507.3/km^{2} (1,314/sq mi)
- Time zone: UTC+01:00 (CET)
  - Summer (DST): UTC+02:00 (CEST)
- INSEE/Postal code: 69279 /69330
- ^{1} French Land Register data, which excludes lakes, ponds, glaciers > 1 km^{2} (0.386 sq mi or 247 acres) and river estuaries.

Jonage (French pronunciation: [ʒɔnaʒ]) is a commune in the Metropolis of Lyon in Auvergne-Rhône-Alpes region in eastern France.

== Population ==
Historical population
Year	Pop.	±% p.a.
1968	1,445	—
1975	2,206	+6.23%
1982	2,938	+4.18%
1990	5,076	+7.07%
1999	5,363	+0.61%
2007	5,767	+0.91%
2012	5,807	+0.14%
2017	5,903	+0.33%
2023	6,144	+0.67%
Source: INSEE

== See also ==
- Communes of the Metropolis of Lyon
