= Saint-Romain-au-Mont-d'Or =

- Commune
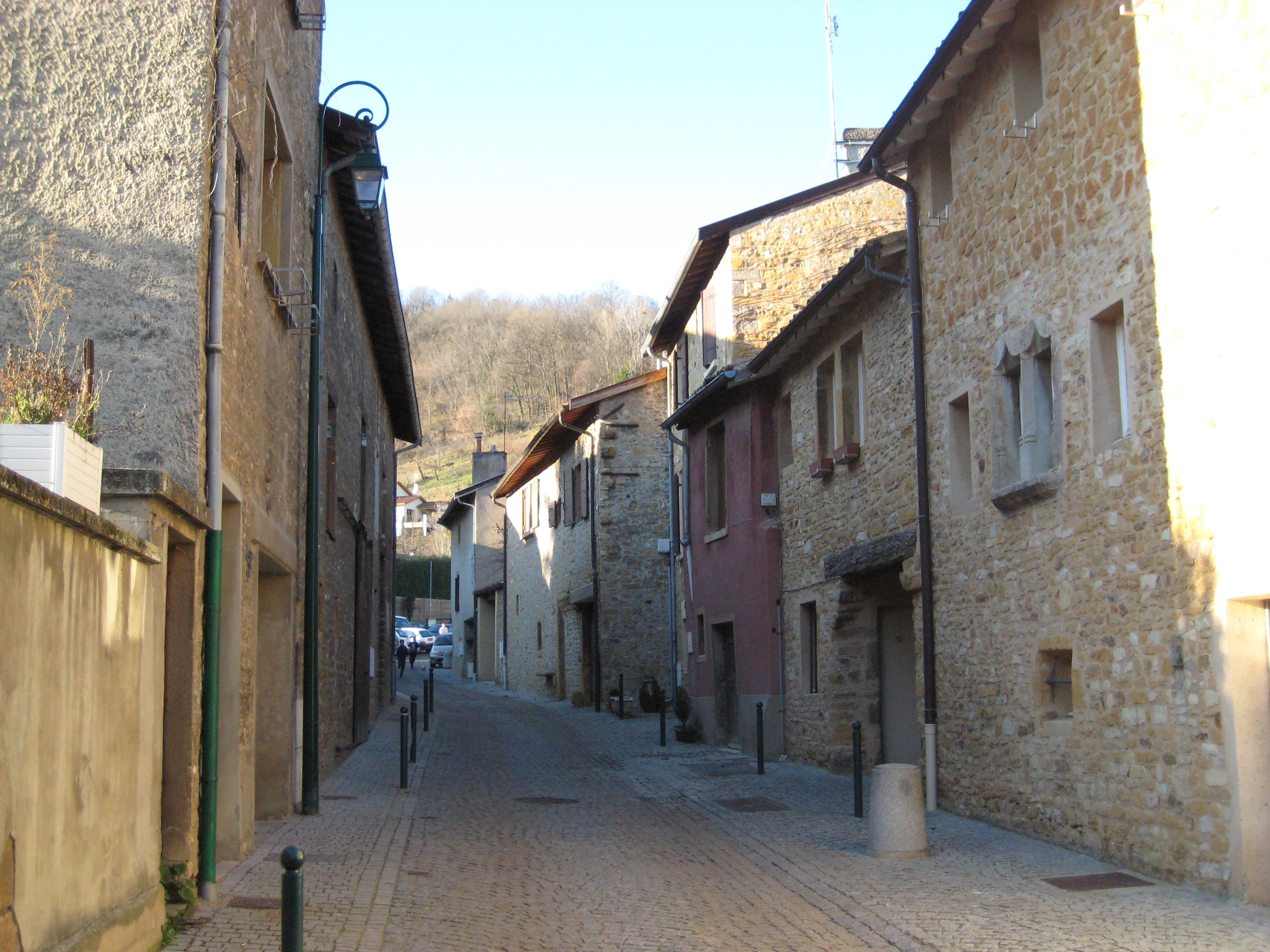
- A street in Saint-Romain-au-Mont-d'Or

- Coat of arms
- Location of Saint-Romain-au-Mont-d'Or
- Location within France Location within Auvergne-Rhône-Alpes
- Coordinates: 45°50′17″N 4°49′23″E
- Country: France
- Region: Auvergne-Rhône-Alpes
- Metropolis: Lyon Metropolis
- Arrondissement: Lyon

Government
  - Mayor (2022–2026): Guillaume Malot
- Area^{1}: 2.62 km^{2} (1.01 sq mi)
- Highest elevation: 492 m (1,614 ft)
- Lowest elevation: 165 m (541 ft)
- Population (2023): 1,247
  - Density: 476/km^{2} (1,230/sq mi)
- Time zone: UTC+01:00 (CET)
  - Summer (DST): UTC+02:00 (CEST)
- INSEE/Postal code: 69233 /69270
- ^{1} French Land Register data, which excludes lakes, ponds, glaciers > 1 km^{2} (0.386 sq mi or 247 acres) and river estuaries.

Saint-Romain-au-Mont-d'Or (French pronunciation: [sɛ̃ ʁɔmɛ̃ o mɔ̃ dɔʁ]) is a commune in the Metropolis of Lyon in Auvergne-Rhône-Alpes region in eastern France.

== See also ==
- Communes of the Metropolis of Lyon
