= Saint-Genis-les-Ollières =

- Commune
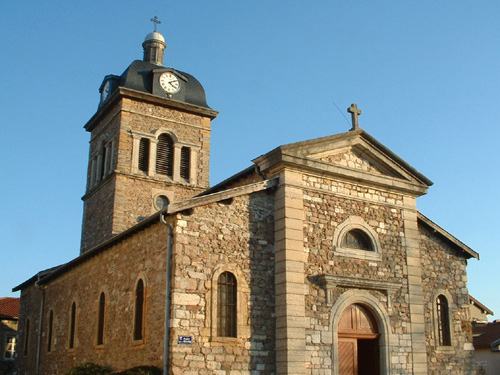
- The church in Saint-Genis-les-Ollières

- Coat of arms
- Location of Saint-Genis-les-Ollières
- Location within France Location within Auvergne-Rhône-Alpes
- Coordinates: 45°45′25″N 4°43′34″E
- Country: France
- Region: Auvergne-Rhône-Alpes
- Metropolis: Lyon Metropolis
- Arrondissement: Lyon

Government
  - Mayor (2020–2026): Didier Cretenet
- Area^{1}: 3.74 km^{2} (1.44 sq mi)
- Elevation: 208 m (682 ft)
- Highest elevation: 319 m (1,047 ft)
- Lowest elevation: 209 m (686 ft)
- Population (2023): 5,439
  - Density: 1,450/km^{2} (3,770/sq mi)
- Time zone: UTC+01:00 (CET)
  - Summer (DST): UTC+02:00 (CEST)
- INSEE/Postal code: 69205 /69290
- ^{1} French Land Register data, which excludes lakes, ponds, glaciers > 1 km^{2} (0.386 sq mi or 247 acres) and river estuaries.

Saint-Genis-les-Ollières (French pronunciation: [sɛ̃ ʒəni le.z‿ɔljɛʁ]) is a commune in the Metropolis of Lyon in Auvergne-Rhône-Alpes region in eastern France.

== Population ==
Historical population
Year	Pop.	±% p.a.
1968	1,429	—
1975	2,125	+5.83%
1982	2,781	+3.92%
1990	4,211	+5.32%
1999	4,743	+1.33%
2007	4,655	−0.23%
2012	4,563	−0.40%
2017	4,984	+1.78%
2023	5,439	+1.47%
Source: INSEE

== See also ==
- Communes of the Metropolis of Lyon
