= Mions =

- Commune
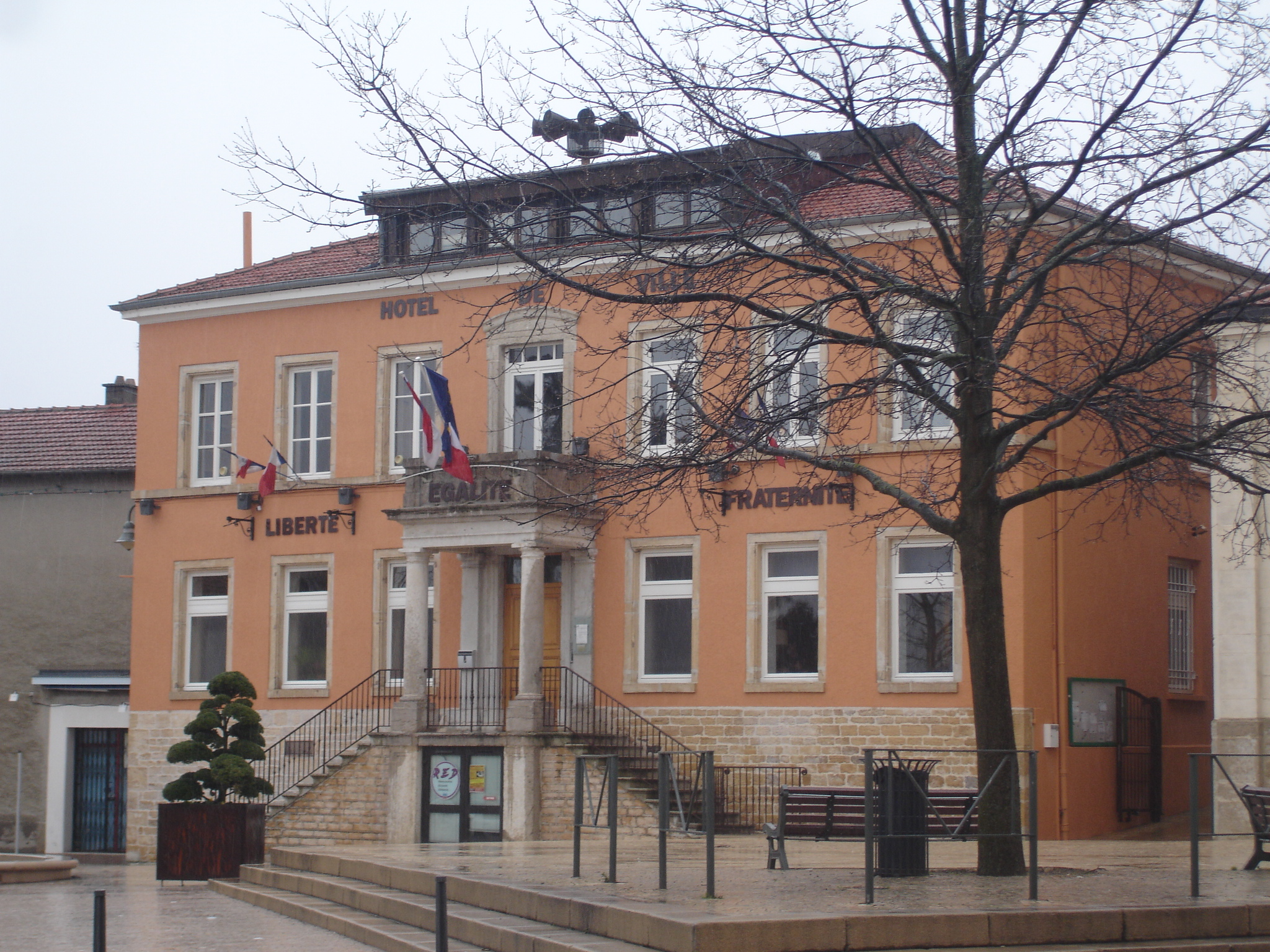
- The town hall in Mions

- Coat of arms
- Location of Mions
- Location within France Location within Auvergne-Rhône-Alpes
- Coordinates: 45°39′46″N 4°57′22″E
- Country: France
- Region: Auvergne-Rhône-Alpes
- Metropolis: Lyon Metropolis
- Arrondissement: Lyon

Government
  - Mayor (2020–2026): Claude Cohen
- Area^{1}: 11.56 km^{2} (4.46 sq mi)
- Elevation: 192 m (630 ft)
- Highest elevation: 250 m (820 ft)
- Lowest elevation: 167 m (548 ft)
- Population (2023): 13,843
  - Density: 1,197/km^{2} (3,101/sq mi)
- Time zone: UTC+01:00 (CET)
  - Summer (DST): UTC+02:00 (CEST)
- INSEE/Postal code: 69283 /69780
- ^{1} French Land Register data, which excludes lakes, ponds, glaciers > 1 km^{2} (0.386 sq mi or 247 acres) and river estuaries.

Mions (French pronunciation: [mjɔ̃s]) is a commune in the Metropolis of Lyon in Auvergne-Rhône-Alpes region in eastern France. The residents of the city are called Miolands and Miolandes.

== Population ==
Historical population
Year	Pop.	±% p.a.
1968	2,848	—
1975	5,081	+8.62%
1982	6,044	+2.51%
1990	9,145	+5.31%
1999	10,283	+1.31%
2007	11,397	+1.29%
2012	12,233	+1.43%
2017	13,542	+2.05%
2023	13,843	+0.37%
Source: INSEE

== See also ==
- Communes of the Metropolis of Lyon
