= Quincieux =

Quincieux Quinciô (Arpitan)
- Commune
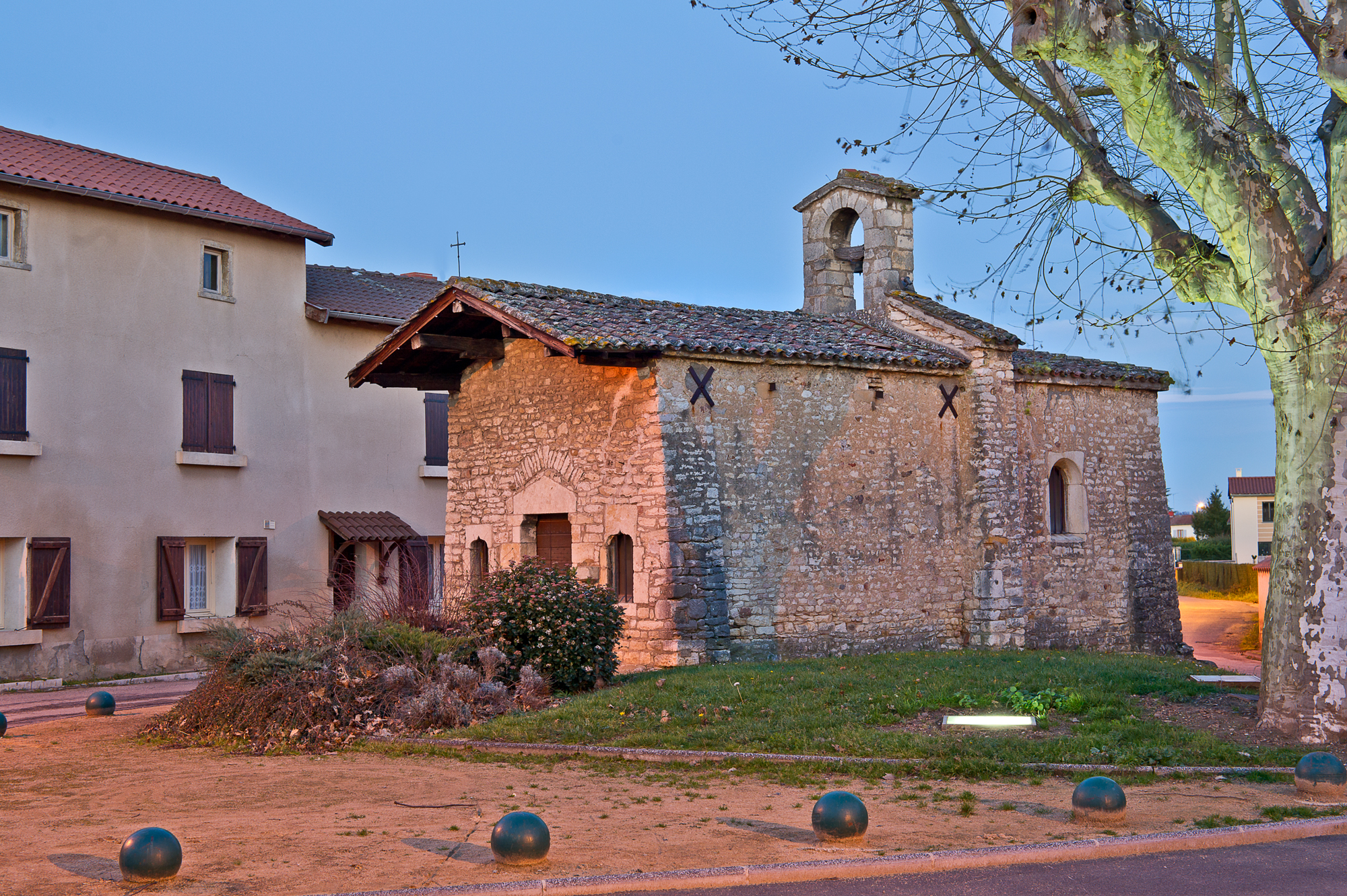
- The church in the hamlet of La Chapelle

- Coat of arms
- Location of Quincieux
- Location within France Location within Auvergne-Rhône-Alpes
- Coordinates: 45°54′52″N 4°46′40″E
- Country: France
- Region: Auvergne-Rhône-Alpes
- Metropolis: Lyon Metropolis
- Arrondissement: Lyon

Government
  - Mayor (2020–2026): Pascal David
- Area^{1}: 17.72 km^{2} (6.84 sq mi)
- Elevation: 177 m (581 ft)
- Highest elevation: 196 m (643 ft)
- Lowest elevation: 167 m (548 ft)
- Population (2023): 3,679
  - Density: 207.6/km^{2} (537.7/sq mi)
- Demonym: Quincerots
- Time zone: UTC+01:00 (CET)
  - Summer (DST): UTC+02:00 (CEST)
- INSEE/Postal code: 69163 /69650
- Website: www.quincieux.fr
- ^{1} French Land Register data, which excludes lakes, ponds, glaciers > 1 km^{2} (0.386 sq mi or 247 acres) and river estuaries.

Quincieux (French pronunciation: [kɛ̃sjø]; Arpitan: Quinciô) is the northernmost commune of the Metropolis of Lyon in the Auvergne-Rhône-Alpes region, central-eastern France. It is located on the right bank of the Saône, north-northwest of Lyon, on the border with both Rhône and Ain, the latter of which follows the course of the Saône.

== Transport ==
Quincieux is served by Quincieux station on the Paris–Marseille railway.

== Demographics ==
Historical population
Year	Pop.	±% p.a.
1968	1,270	—
1975	1,510	+2.50%
1982	1,920	+3.49%
1990	2,300	+2.28%
1999	2,657	+1.62%
2007	2,899	+1.10%
2012	3,203	+2.01%
2017	3,467	+1.60%
2023	3,679	+0.99%
Source: INSEE

== See also ==
- Communes of the Lyon Metropolis
