= Grigny-sur-Rhône =

- Commune
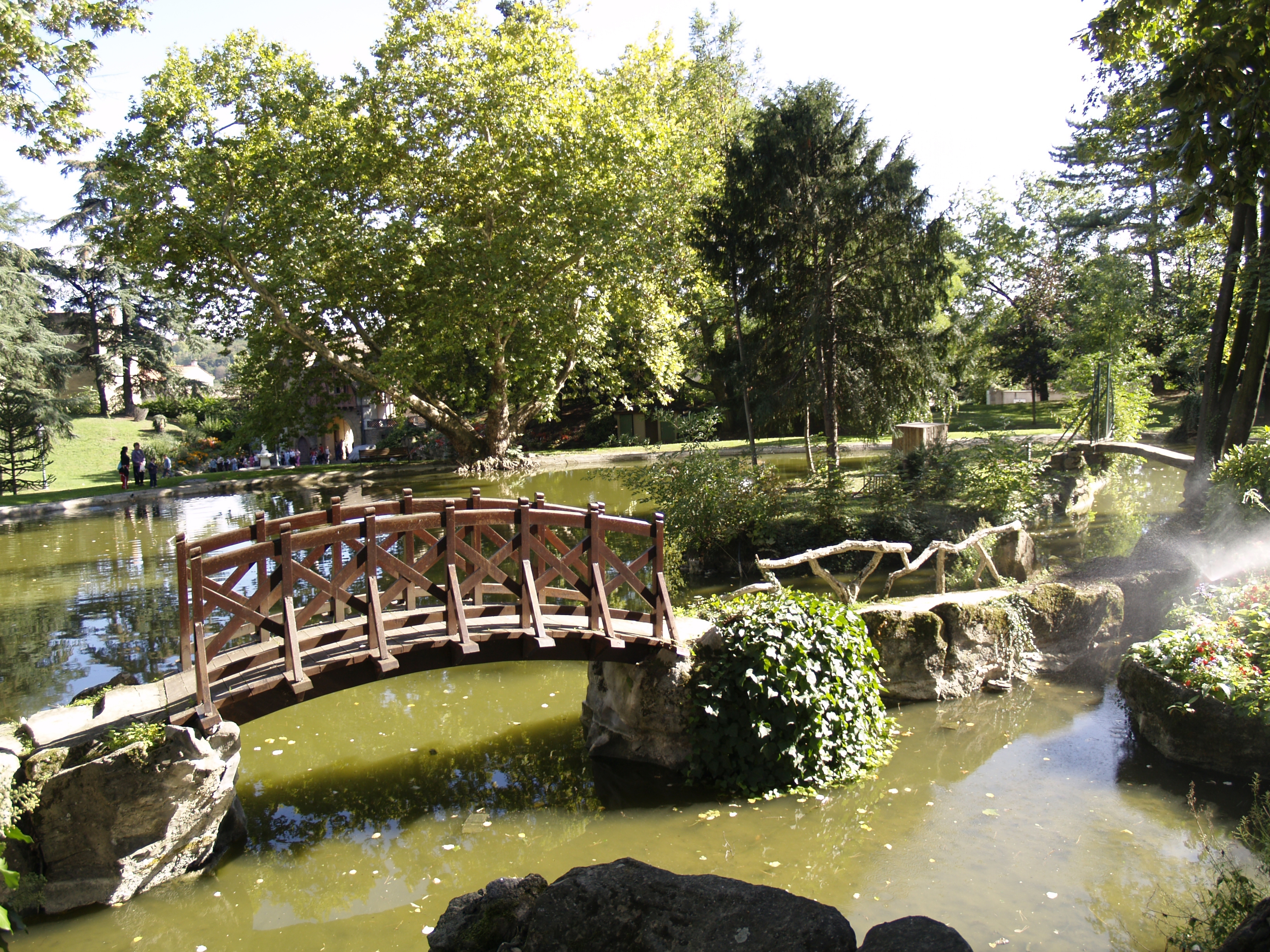
- The gardens of the manor in Grigny-sur-Rhône
- Location of Grigny-sur-Rhône
- Location within France Location within Auvergne-Rhône-Alpes
- Coordinates: 45°36′33″N 4°47′26″E
- Country: France
- Region: Auvergne-Rhône-Alpes
- Metropolis: Lyon Metropolis
- Arrondissement: Lyon

Government
  - Mayor (2020–2026): Xavier Odo (DVD)
- Area^{1}: 5.75 km^{2} (2.22 sq mi)
- Elevation: 160 m (520 ft)
- Highest elevation: 245 m (804 ft)
- Lowest elevation: 152 m (499 ft)
- Population (2023): 10,030
  - Density: 1,740/km^{2} (4,520/sq mi)
- Demonym: Grignerots
- Time zone: UTC+01:00 (CET)
  - Summer (DST): UTC+02:00 (CEST)
- INSEE/Postal code: 69096 /69520
- Website: www.grignysurrhone.fr
- ^{1} French Land Register data, which excludes lakes, ponds, glaciers > 1 km^{2} (0.386 sq mi or 247 acres) and river estuaries.

Grigny-sur-Rhône (French pronunciation: [ɡʁiɲi syʁ ʁon]; lit. 'Grigny-on-Rhône'; known officially until 2025 simply as Grigny) is a commune in the Metropolis of Lyon in the Auvergne-Rhône-Alpes region in central-eastern France. It is just northeast of Givors, on the right bank of the Rhône.

== History ==
Grigny became of a member of the Urban Community of Lyon in 2007. On 1 January 2015 Grigny left the department of Rhône to join the Metropolis of Lyon.

== Population ==
Historical population
Year	Pop.	±% p.a.
1968	7,994	—
1975	10,177	+3.51%
1982	8,108	−3.19%
1990	7,498	−0.97%
1999	7,873	+0.54%
2007	8,563	+1.06%
2012	9,245	+1.54%
2017	9,662	+0.89%
2023	10,030	+0.62%
Source: INSEE

== See also ==
- Communes of the Metropolis of Lyon
