= Solaize =

- Commune
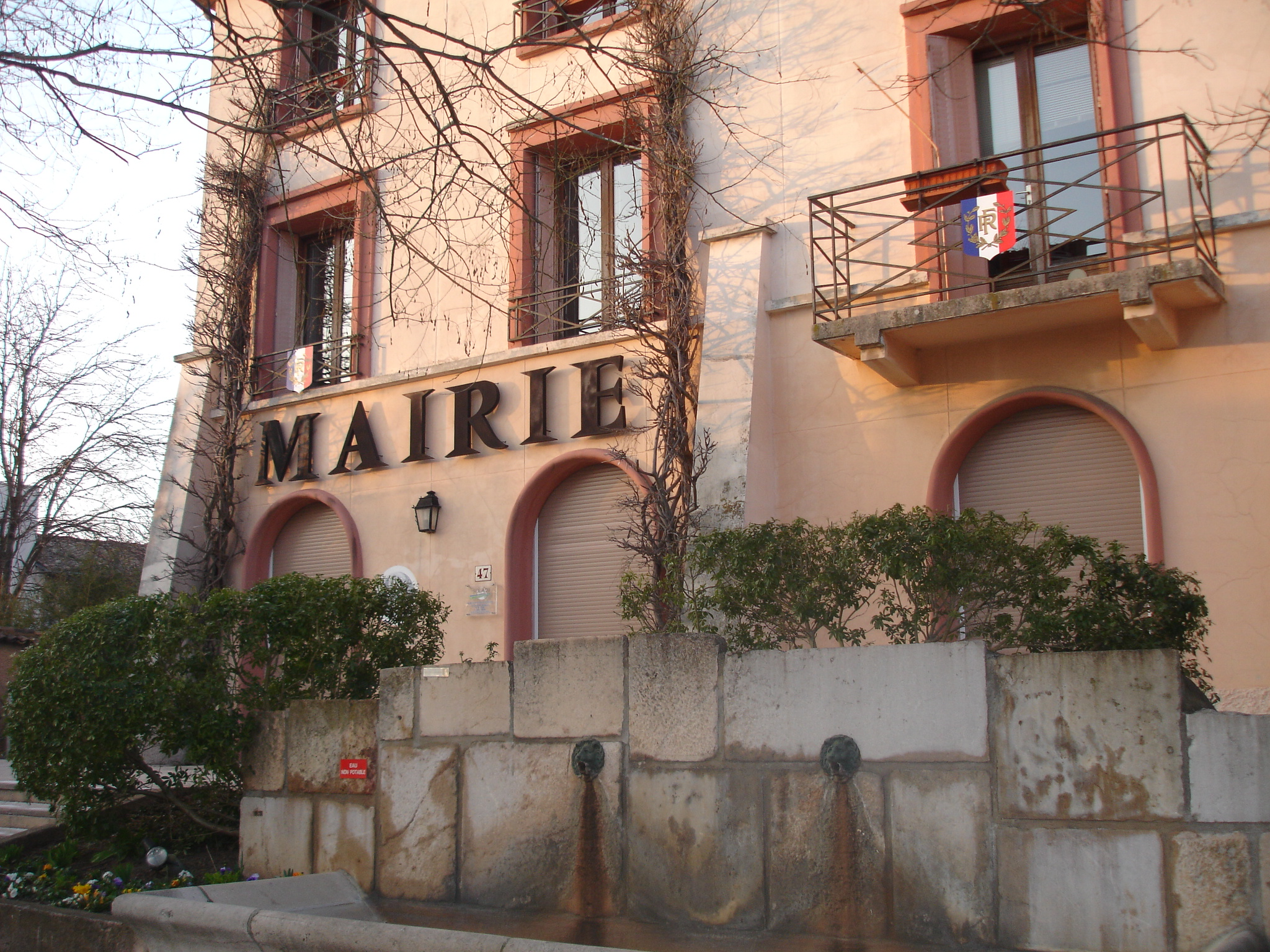
- The town hall in Solaize
- Location of Solaize
- Location within France Location within Auvergne-Rhône-Alpes
- Coordinates: 45°38′24″N 4°50′28″E
- Country: France
- Region: Auvergne-Rhône-Alpes
- Metropolis: Lyon Metropolis
- Arrondissement: Lyon

Government
  - Mayor (2020–2026): Guy Barral
- Area^{1}: 8.1 km^{2} (3.1 sq mi)
- Elevation: 250 m (820 ft)
- Highest elevation: 249 m (817 ft)
- Lowest elevation: 155 m (509 ft)
- Population (2023): 3,144
  - Density: 390/km^{2} (1,000/sq mi)
- Time zone: UTC+01:00 (CET)
  - Summer (DST): UTC+02:00 (CEST)
- INSEE/Postal code: 69296 /69360
- ^{1} French Land Register data, which excludes lakes, ponds, glaciers > 1 km^{2} (0.386 sq mi or 247 acres) and river estuaries.

Solaize (French pronunciation: [sɔlɛz]; Arpitan: Celuése) is a commune in the Metropolis of Lyon in Auvergne-Rhône-Alpes region in eastern France.

== Population ==
Historical population
Year	Pop.	±% p.a.
1968	1,119	—
1975	1,445	+3.72%
1982	1,783	+3.05%
1990	2,008	+1.50%
1999	2,256	+1.30%
2007	2,687	+2.21%
2012	2,931	+1.75%
2017	2,922	−0.06%
2023	3,144	+1.23%
Source: INSEE

== See also ==
- Communes of the Metropolis of Lyon
