= Saint-Didier-au-Mont-d'Or =

- Commune
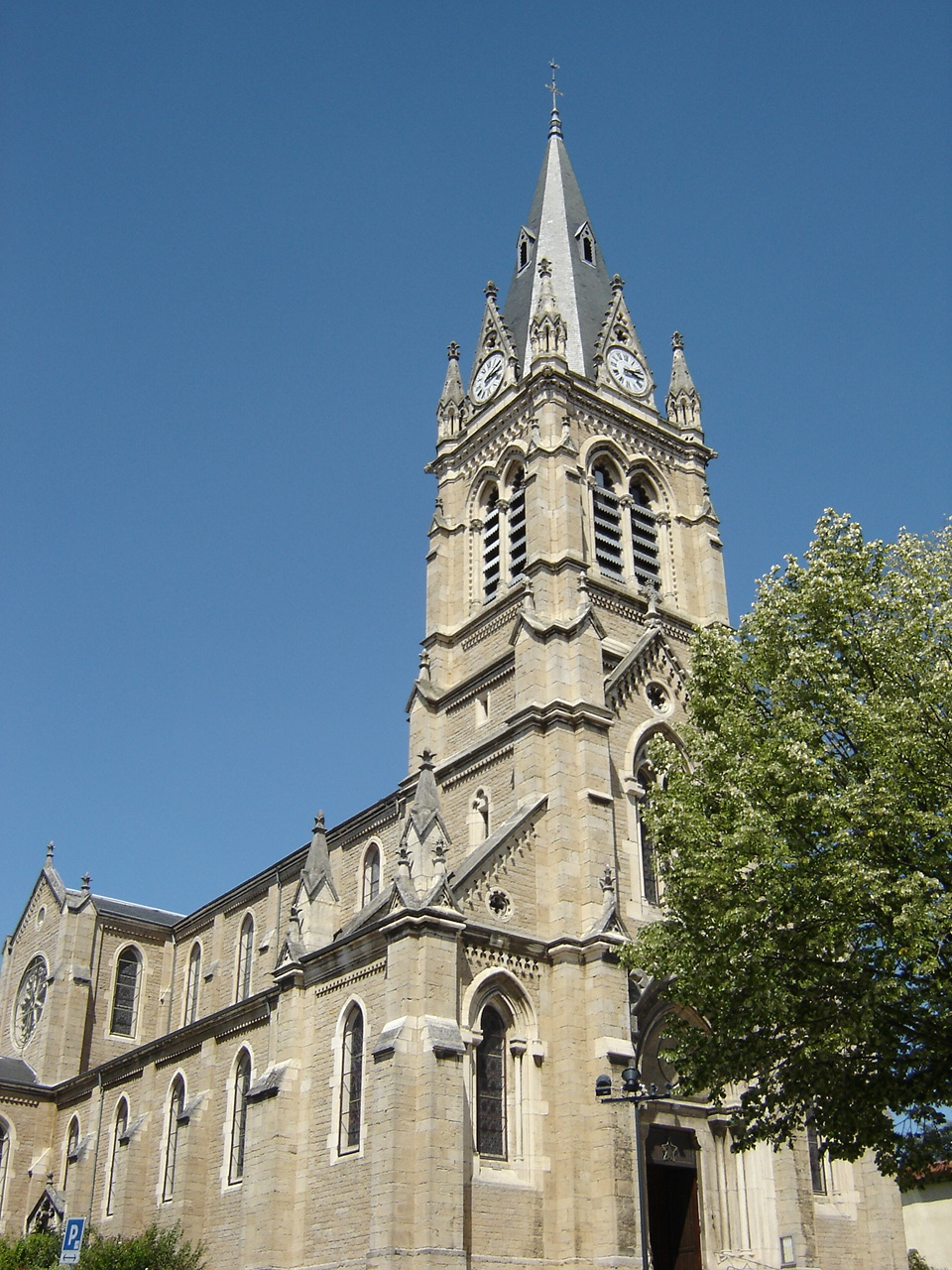
- The church in Saint-Didier-au-Mont-d'Or

- Coat of arms
- Location of Saint-Didier-au-Mont-d'Or
- Location within France Location within Auvergne-Rhône-Alpes
- Coordinates: 45°48′40″N 4°47′56″E
- Country: France
- Region: Auvergne-Rhône-Alpes
- Metropolis: Lyon Metropolis
- Arrondissement: Lyon

Government
  - Mayor (2020–2026): Marie-Hélène Mathieu
- Area^{1}: 8.34 km^{2} (3.22 sq mi)
- Elevation: 320 m (1,050 ft)
- Highest elevation: 587 m (1,926 ft)
- Lowest elevation: 175 m (574 ft)
- Population (2023): 7,435
  - Density: 891/km^{2} (2,310/sq mi)
- Time zone: UTC+01:00 (CET)
  - Summer (DST): UTC+02:00 (CEST)
- INSEE/Postal code: 69194 /69370
- ^{1} French Land Register data, which excludes lakes, ponds, glaciers > 1 km^{2} (0.386 sq mi or 247 acres) and river estuaries.

Saint-Didier-au-Mont-d'Or (French pronunciation: [sɛ̃ didje o mɔ̃ dɔʁ]) is a commune in the Metropolis of Lyon in Auvergne-Rhône-Alpes region in eastern France.

The residents of the town are called Désidériens in French. As of 2020, it is the commune with the highest median per capita income (€44,260 per year) in the Metropolis of Lyon.

== Population ==
Historical population
Year	Pop.	±% p.a.
1968	3,872	—
1975	4,648	+2.64%
1982	5,115	+1.38%
1990	5,967	+1.94%
1999	6,154	+0.34%
2007	6,342	+0.38%
2012	6,403	+0.19%
2017	6,785	+1.17%
2023	7,435	+1.54%
Source: INSEE

== See also ==
- Communes of the Metropolis of Lyon
