= Cailloux-sur-Fontaines =

- Commune
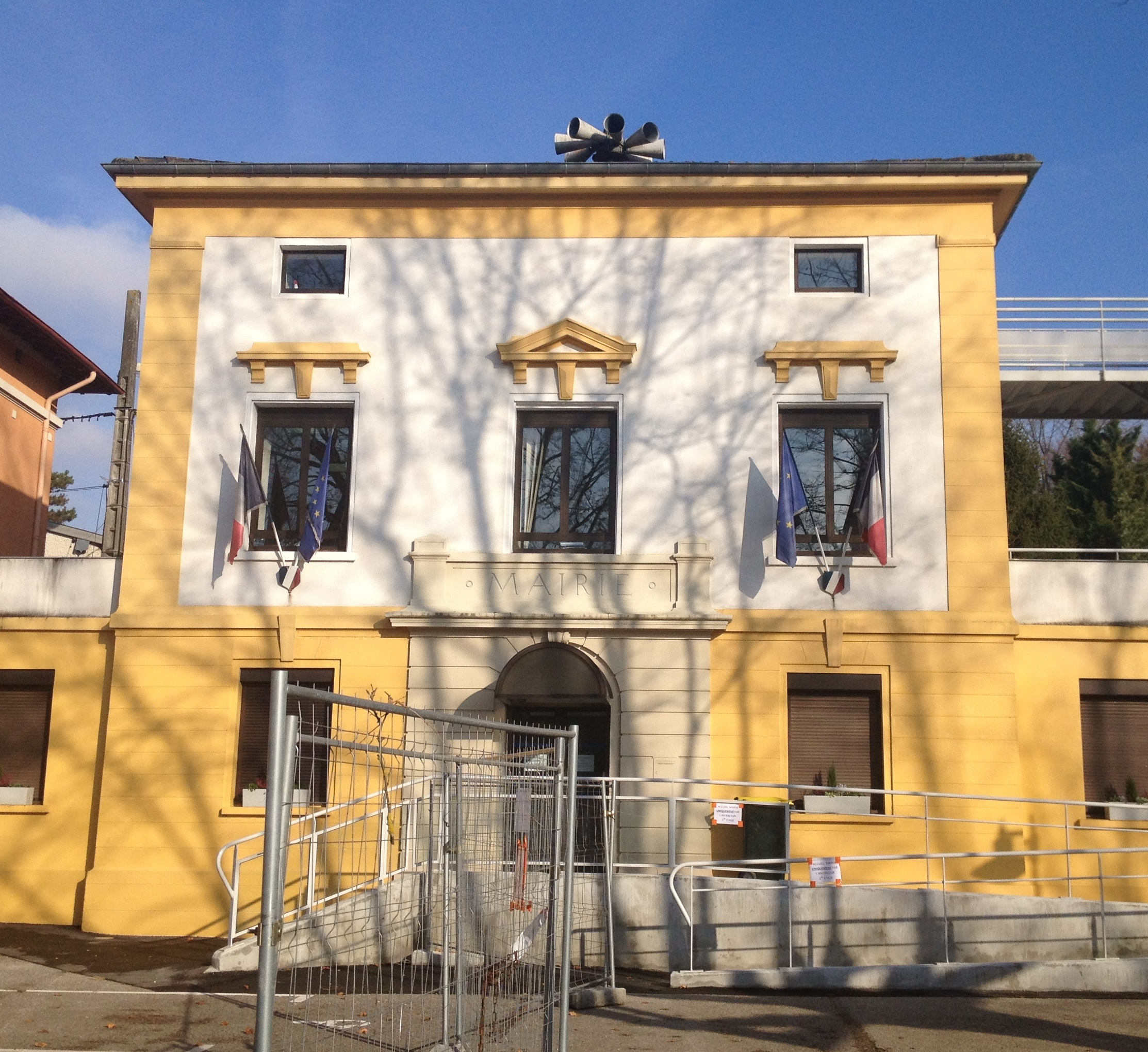
- The town hall of Cailloux-sur-Fontaines

- Coat of arms
- Location of Cailloux-sur-Fontaines
- Location within France Location within Auvergne-Rhône-Alpes
- Coordinates: 45°51′11″N 4°52′30″E
- Country: France
- Region: Auvergne-Rhône-Alpes
- Metropolis: Lyon Metropolis
- Arrondissement: Lyon

Government
  - Mayor (2020–2026): Angélique Enderlin
- Area^{1}: 8.69 km^{2} (3.36 sq mi)
- Elevation: 284 m (932 ft)
- Highest elevation: 313 m (1,027 ft)
- Lowest elevation: 218 m (715 ft)
- Population (2023): 2,989
  - Density: 344/km^{2} (891/sq mi)
- Time zone: UTC+01:00 (CET)
  - Summer (DST): UTC+02:00 (CEST)
- INSEE/Postal code: 69033 /69270
- ^{1} French Land Register data, which excludes lakes, ponds, glaciers > 1 km^{2} (0.386 sq mi or 247 acres) and river estuaries.

Cailloux-sur-Fontaines (French pronunciation: [kaju syʁ fɔ̃tɛn], lit. 'Cailloux on Fontaines'; Arpitan: Calyous) is a commune in the Metropolis of Lyon in Auvergne-Rhône-Alpes region in eastern France.

== Population ==
Historical population
| Year | Pop. | ±% p.a. |
|---|---|---|
| 1968 | 751 | — |
| 1975 | 863 | +2.01% |
| 1982 | 1,015 | +2.34% |
| 1990 | 1,750 | +7.05% |
| 1999 | 2,172 | +2.43% |
| 2007 | 2,339 | +0.93% |
| 2012 | 2,509 | +1.41% |
| 2017 | 2,722 | +1.64% |
| 2023 | 2,989 | +1.57% |
Source: INSEE
