= Irigny =

- Commune
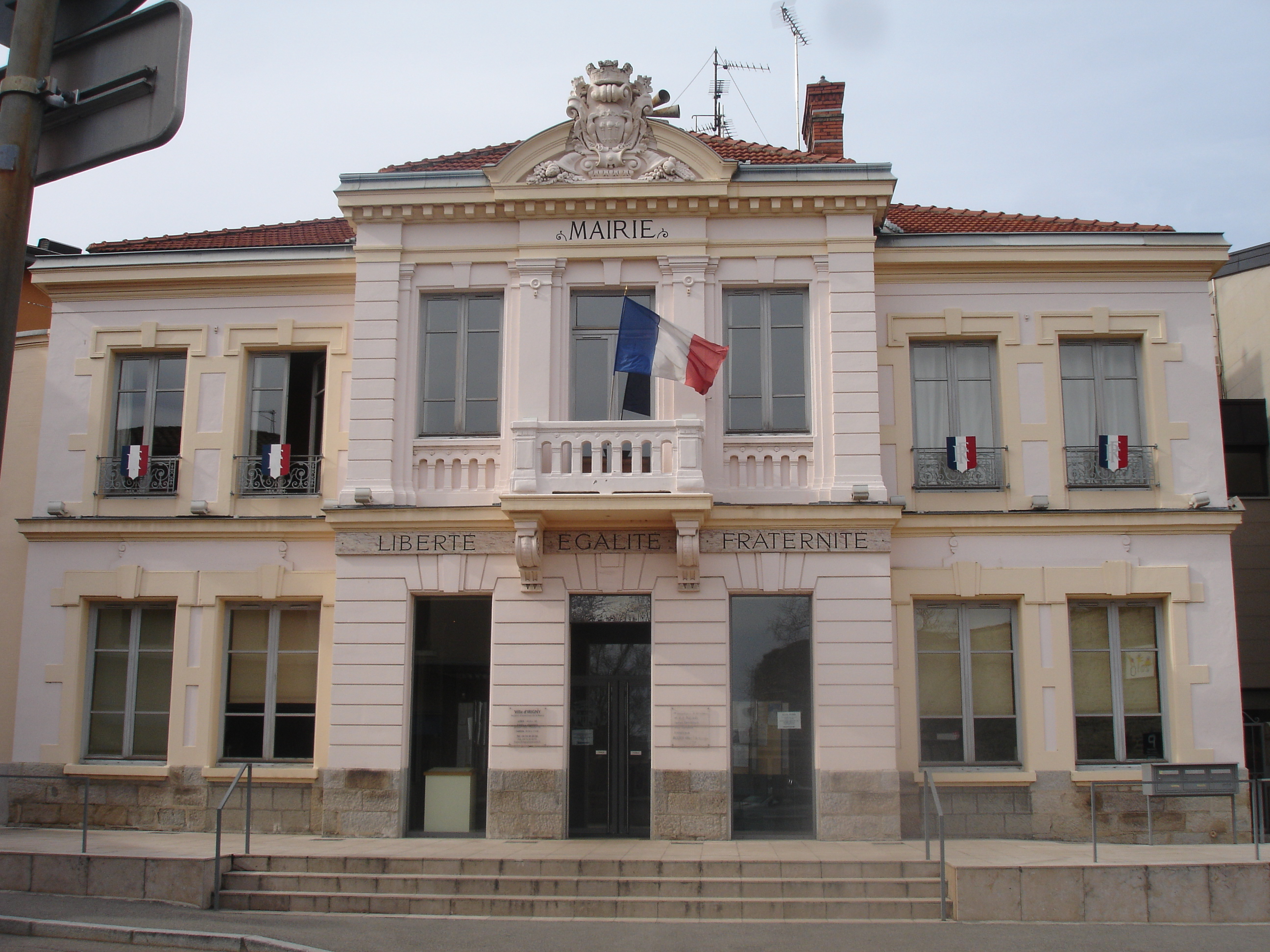
- The town hall in Irigny

- Coat of arms
- Location of Irigny
- Location within France Location within Auvergne-Rhône-Alpes
- Coordinates: 45°40′26″N 4°49′23″E
- Country: France
- Region: Auvergne-Rhône-Alpes
- Metropolis: Lyon Metropolis
- Arrondissement: Lyon

Government
  - Mayor (2020–2026): Blandine Freyer
- Area^{1}: 8.84 km^{2} (3.41 sq mi)
- Elevation: 237 m (778 ft)
- Highest elevation: 271 m (889 ft)
- Lowest elevation: 155 m (509 ft)
- Population (2023): 9,034
  - Density: 1,020/km^{2} (2,650/sq mi)
- Time zone: UTC+01:00 (CET)
  - Summer (DST): UTC+02:00 (CEST)
- INSEE/Postal code: 69100 /69540
- ^{1} French Land Register data, which excludes lakes, ponds, glaciers > 1 km^{2} (0.386 sq mi or 247 acres) and river estuaries.

Irigny (French pronunciation: [iʁiɲi]; Arpitan: Éregnins) is a commune in the Metropolis of Lyon in Auvergne-Rhône-Alpes region in eastern France. The residents are called Irignois.

== Population ==
Historical population
Year	Pop.	±% p.a.
1968	3,679	—
1975	5,226	+5.14%
1982	6,828	+3.89%
1990	7,955	+1.93%
1999	8,330	+0.51%
2007	8,270	−0.09%
2012	8,250	−0.05%
2017	8,641	+0.93%
2023	9,034	+0.74%
Source: INSEE

== See also ==
- Communes of the Metropolis of Lyon
