= Fontaines-Saint-Martin =

- Commune
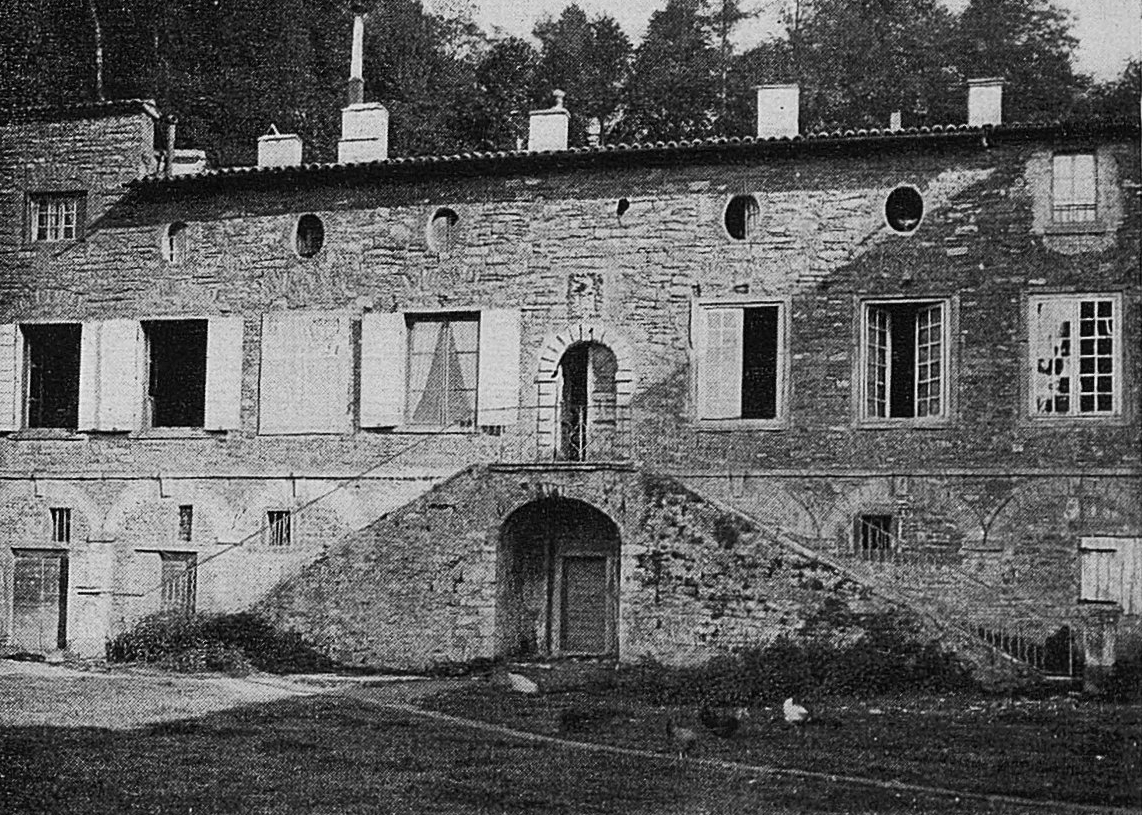
- Château du Buisson

- Coat of arms
- Location of Fontaines-Saint-Martin
- Location within France Location within Auvergne-Rhône-Alpes
- Coordinates: 45°50′42″N 4°51′11″E
- Country: France
- Region: Auvergne-Rhône-Alpes
- Metropolis: Lyon Metropolis
- Arrondissement: Lyon

Government
  - Mayor (2020–2026): Virginie Poulain
- Area^{1}: 2.74 km^{2} (1.06 sq mi)
- Elevation: 280 m (920 ft)
- Highest elevation: 288 m (945 ft)
- Lowest elevation: 182 m (597 ft)
- Population (2023): 3,098
  - Density: 1,130/km^{2} (2,930/sq mi)
- Time zone: UTC+01:00 (CET)
  - Summer (DST): UTC+02:00 (CEST)
- INSEE/Postal code: 69087 /69270
- ^{1} French Land Register data, which excludes lakes, ponds, glaciers > 1 km^{2} (0.386 sq mi or 247 acres) and river estuaries.

Fontaines-Saint-Martin (French pronunciation: [fɔ̃tɛn sɛ̃ maʁtɛ̃]) is a commune in the Metropolis of Lyon in Auvergne-Rhône-Alpes region in eastern France.

== Population ==
Historical population
| Year | Pop. | ±% p.a. |
|---|---|---|
| 1968 | 1,306 | — |
| 1975 | 1,826 | +4.90% |
| 1982 | 2,056 | +1.71% |
| 1990 | 2,124 | +0.41% |
| 1999 | 2,721 | +2.79% |
| 2007 | 2,698 | −0.11% |
| 2012 | 3,060 | +2.55% |
| 2017 | 3,052 | −0.05% |
| 2023 | 3,098 | +0.25% |
Source: INSEE
