= Saint-Cyr-au-Mont-d'Or =

Saint-Cyr-au-Mont-d'Or Sant-Ciro-en-Mont-Tor (Arpitan)
- Commune
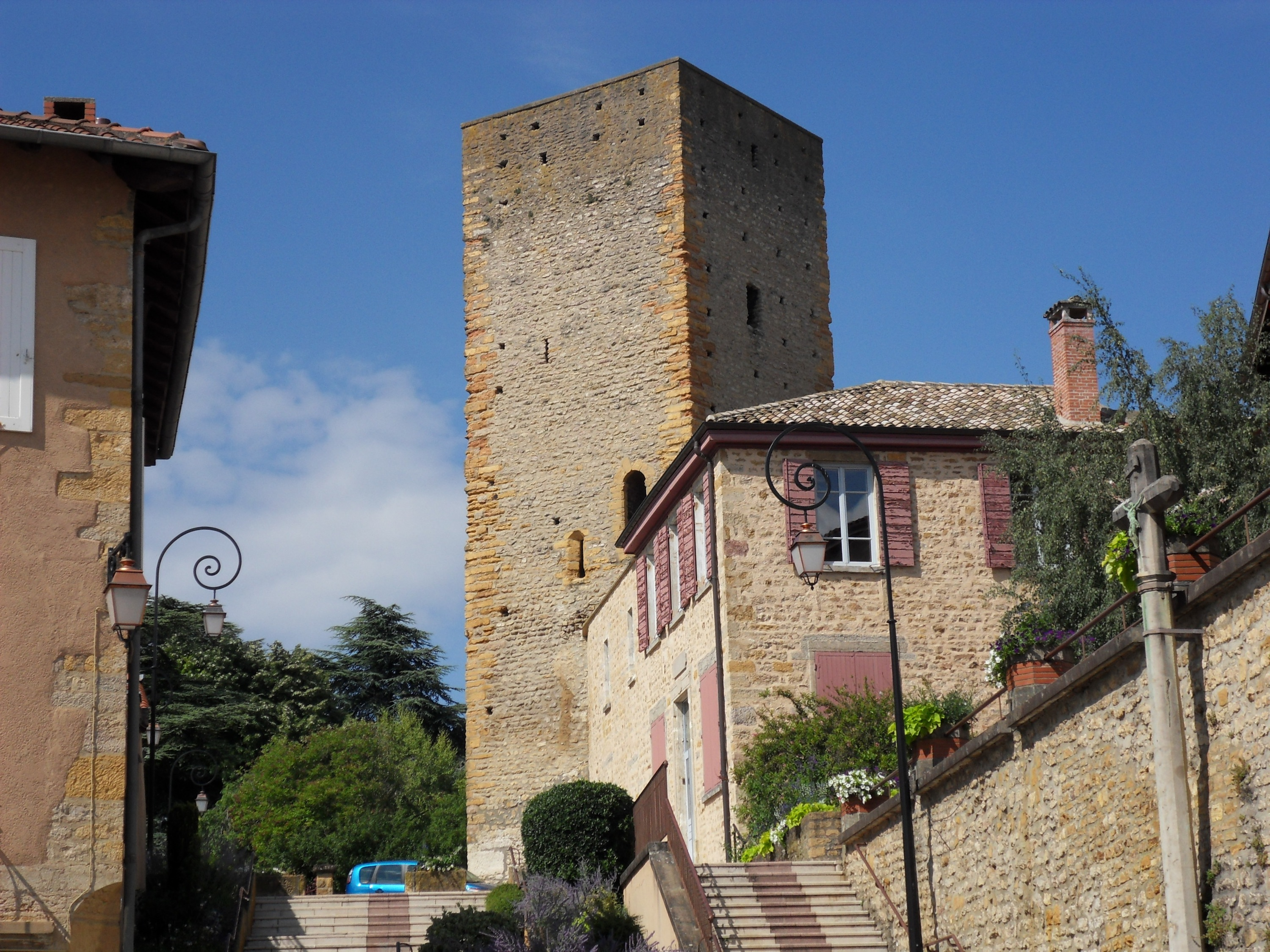
- The tower of the Château de Saint-Cyr

- Coat of arms
- Location of Saint-Cyr-au-Mont-d'Or
- Location within France Location within Auvergne-Rhône-Alpes
- Coordinates: 45°48′54″N 4°49′05″E
- Country: France
- Region: Auvergne-Rhône-Alpes
- Metropolis: Lyon Metropolis
- Arrondissement: Lyon

Government
  - Mayor (2020–2026): Patrick Guillot
- Area^{1}: 7.29 km^{2} (2.81 sq mi)
- Elevation: 320 m (1,050 ft)
- Highest elevation: 605 m (1,985 ft)
- Lowest elevation: 200 m (660 ft)
- Population (2023): 6,327
  - Density: 868/km^{2} (2,250/sq mi)
- Demonym: Saint-Cyrôts
- Time zone: UTC+01:00 (CET)
  - Summer (DST): UTC+02:00 (CEST)
- INSEE/Postal code: 69191 /69450
- Website: www.stcyraumontdor.fr
- ^{1} French Land Register data, which excludes lakes, ponds, glaciers > 1 km^{2} (0.386 sq mi or 247 acres) and river estuaries.

Saint-Cyr-au-Mont-d'Or (French pronunciation: [sɛ̃siʁ o mɔ̃dɔʁ]; Arpitan: Sant-Ciro-en-Mont-Tor) or simply Saint-Cyr is a commune in the Metropolis of Lyon in the Auvergne-Rhône-Alpes region, central-eastern France. It is a northern suburb of Lyon, bordering its 9th arrondissement.

It is one of the richest communities in the Lyon Metropolis with a median household income of €89,819 per year.

== Population ==
Historical population
| Year | Pop. | ±% p.a. |
|---|---|---|
| 1968 | 4,075 | — |
| 1975 | 4,763 | +2.25% |
| 1982 | 4,800 | +0.11% |
| 1990 | 5,318 | +1.29% |
| 1999 | 5,392 | +0.15% |
| 2007 | 5,385 | −0.02% |
| 2012 | 5,480 | +0.35% |
| 2017 | 5,576 | +0.35% |
| 2023 | 6,327 | +2.13% |
Source: INSEE

== See also ==
- Communes of the Metropolis of Lyon
