= Champagne-au-Mont-d'Or =

- Commune
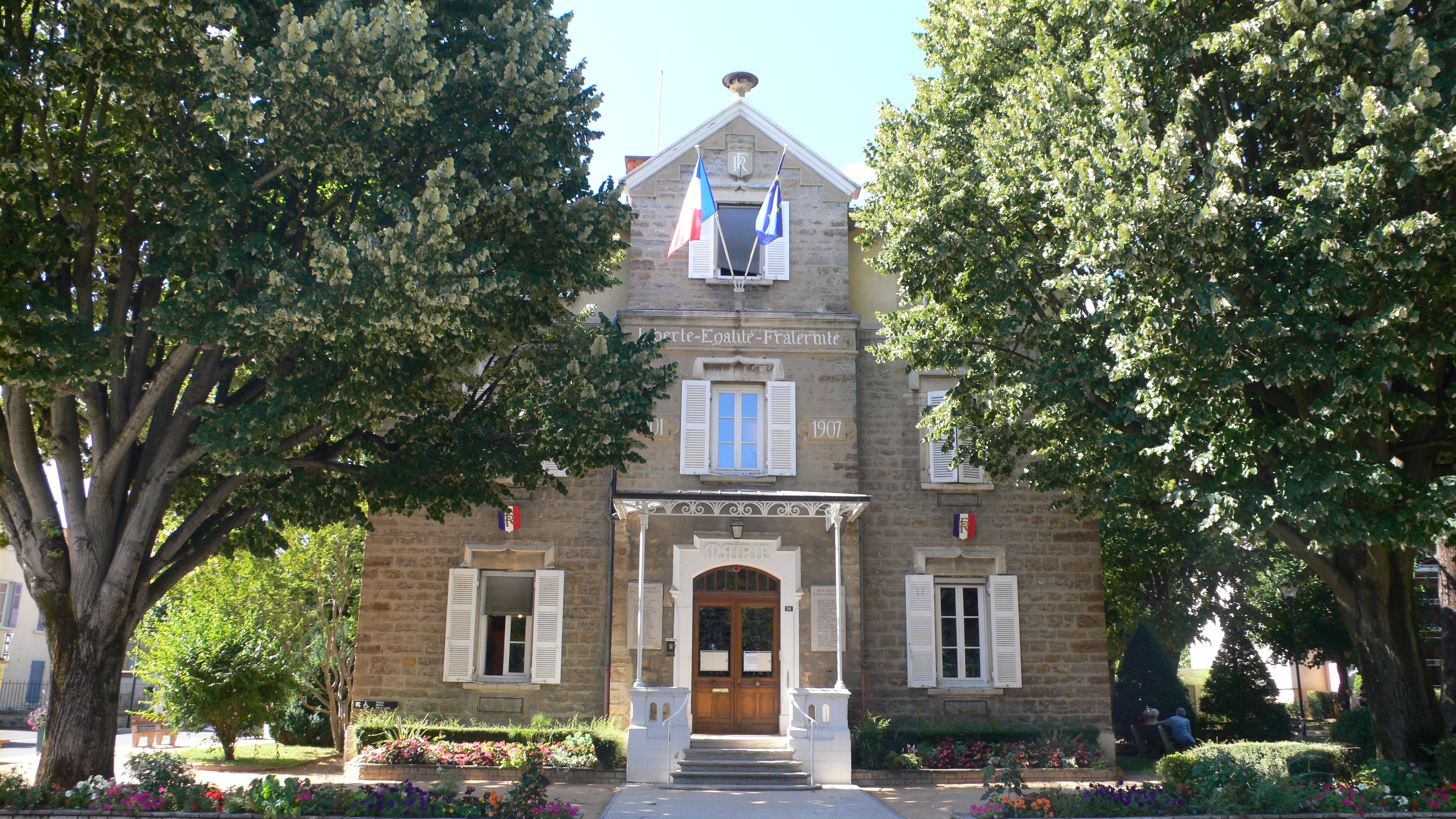
- The town hall of Champagne-au-Mont-d'Or

- Coat of arms
- Location of Champagne-au-Mont-d'Or
- Location within France Location within Auvergne-Rhône-Alpes
- Coordinates: 45°47′42″N 4°47′28″E
- Country: France
- Region: Auvergne-Rhône-Alpes
- Metropolis: Lyon Metropolis
- Arrondissement: Lyon

Government
  - Mayor (2026–32): Christian Besse
- Area^{1}: 2.59 km^{2} (1.00 sq mi)
- Elevation: 210 m (690 ft)
- Highest elevation: 305 m (1,001 ft)
- Lowest elevation: 200 m (660 ft)
- Population (2023): 6,311
  - Density: 2,440/km^{2} (6,310/sq mi)
- Demonym: Champenois
- Time zone: UTC+01:00 (CET)
  - Summer (DST): UTC+02:00 (CEST)
- INSEE/Postal code: 69040 /69410
- Website: www.mairiedechampagne.fr
- ^{1} French Land Register data, which excludes lakes, ponds, glaciers > 1 km^{2} (0.386 sq mi or 247 acres) and river estuaries.

Champagne-au-Mont-d'Or (French pronunciation: [ʃɑ̃paɲ o mɔ̃dɔʁ]) or simply Champagne is a commune in the Metropolis of Lyon in the Auvergne-Rhône-Alpes region in central-eastern France. It is a northwestern suburb of Lyon, on the border with its 9th arrondissement.

== Population ==
Historical population
Year	Pop.	±% p.a.
1968	3,932	—
1975	4,516	+2.00%
1982	4,763	+0.76%
1990	4,934	+0.44%
1999	4,955	+0.05%
2007	4,962	+0.02%
2012	5,254	+1.15%
2017	5,526	+1.01%
2023	6,311	+2.24%
Source: INSEE
