= Montanay =

- Commune
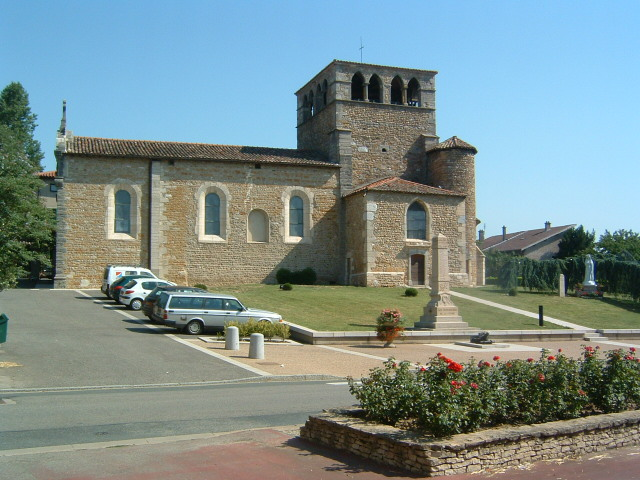
- The church in Montanay
- Location of Montanay
- Location within France Location within Auvergne-Rhône-Alpes
- Coordinates: 45°52′55″N 4°50′49″E
- Country: France
- Region: Auvergne-Rhône-Alpes
- Metropolis: Lyon Metropolis
- Arrondissement: Lyon

Government
  - Mayor (2020–2026): Gilbert Suchet
- Area^{1}: 7.16 km^{2} (2.76 sq mi)
- Elevation: 308 m (1,010 ft)
- Highest elevation: 314 m (1,030 ft)
- Lowest elevation: 202 m (663 ft)
- Population (2023): 3,308
  - Density: 462/km^{2} (1,200/sq mi)
- Time zone: UTC+01:00 (CET)
  - Summer (DST): UTC+02:00 (CEST)
- INSEE/Postal code: 69284 /69250
- ^{1} French Land Register data, which excludes lakes, ponds, glaciers > 1 km^{2} (0.386 sq mi or 247 acres) and river estuaries.

Montanay (French pronunciation: [mɔ̃tanɛ]) is a commune in the Metropolis of Lyon in Auvergne-Rhône-Alpes region in eastern France.

== Population ==
Historical population
Year	Pop.	±% p.a.
1968	742	—
1975	961	+3.76%
1982	1,257	+3.91%
1990	1,835	+4.84%
1999	2,335	+2.71%
2007	2,682	+1.75%
2012	2,865	+1.33%
2017	3,142	+1.86%
2023	3,308	+0.86%
Source: INSEE

== See also ==
- Communes of the Metropolis of Lyon
