= Rochetaillée-sur-Saône =

- Commune
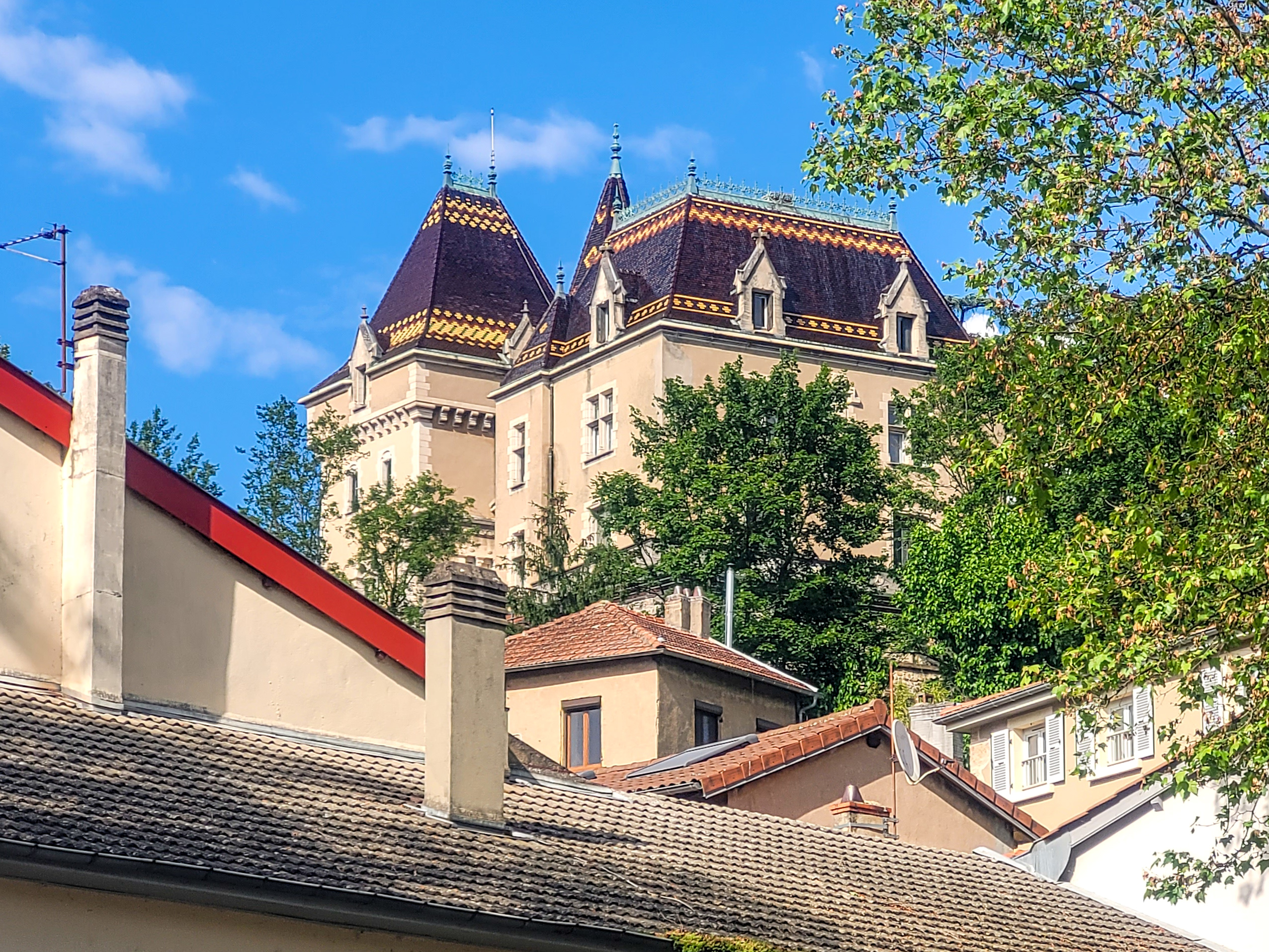
- The Château de Rochetaillée-sur-Saône

- Coat of arms
- Location of Rochetaillée-sur-Saône
- Location within France Location within Auvergne-Rhône-Alpes
- Coordinates: 45°52′58″N 4°50′51″E
- Country: France
- Region: Auvergne-Rhône-Alpes
- Metropolis: Lyon Metropolis
- Arrondissement: Lyon

Government
  - Mayor (2020–2026): Éric Vergiat
- Area^{1}: 4.56 km^{2} (1.76 sq mi)
- Elevation: 258 m (846 ft)
- Highest elevation: 314 m (1,030 ft)
- Lowest elevation: 202 m (663 ft)
- Population (2023): 1,551
  - Density: 340/km^{2} (881/sq mi)
- Demonym: Rochetaillards
- Time zone: UTC+01:00 (CET)
  - Summer (DST): UTC+02:00 (CEST)
- INSEE/Postal code: 69168 /69270
- Website: www.rochetaillee-sur-saone.fr
- ^{1} French Land Register data, which excludes lakes, ponds, glaciers > 1 km^{2} (0.386 sq mi or 247 acres) and river estuaries.

Rochetaillée-sur-Saône (French pronunciation: [ʁɔʃtaje syʁ son], lit. "Rochetaillée-on-Saône") or simply Rochetaillée is a commune in the Metropolis of Lyon in the Auvergne-Rhône-Alpes region in central-eastern France. It is a northern suburb of Lyon, on the left bank of the Saône.

== Population ==
Historical population
Year	Pop.	±% p.a.
1968	723	—
1975	764	+0.79%
1982	779	+0.28%
1990	903	+1.86%
1999	1,134	+2.56%
2007	1,299	+1.71%
2012	1,540	+3.46%
2017	1,528	−0.16%
2023	1,551	+0.25%
Source: INSEE

== Administration ==
The municipal council is composed of 19 members elected for a six-year term. The mayor is elected by the councillors.

== See also ==
- Communes of the Metropolis of Lyon
