= Fleurieu-sur-Saône =

- Commune
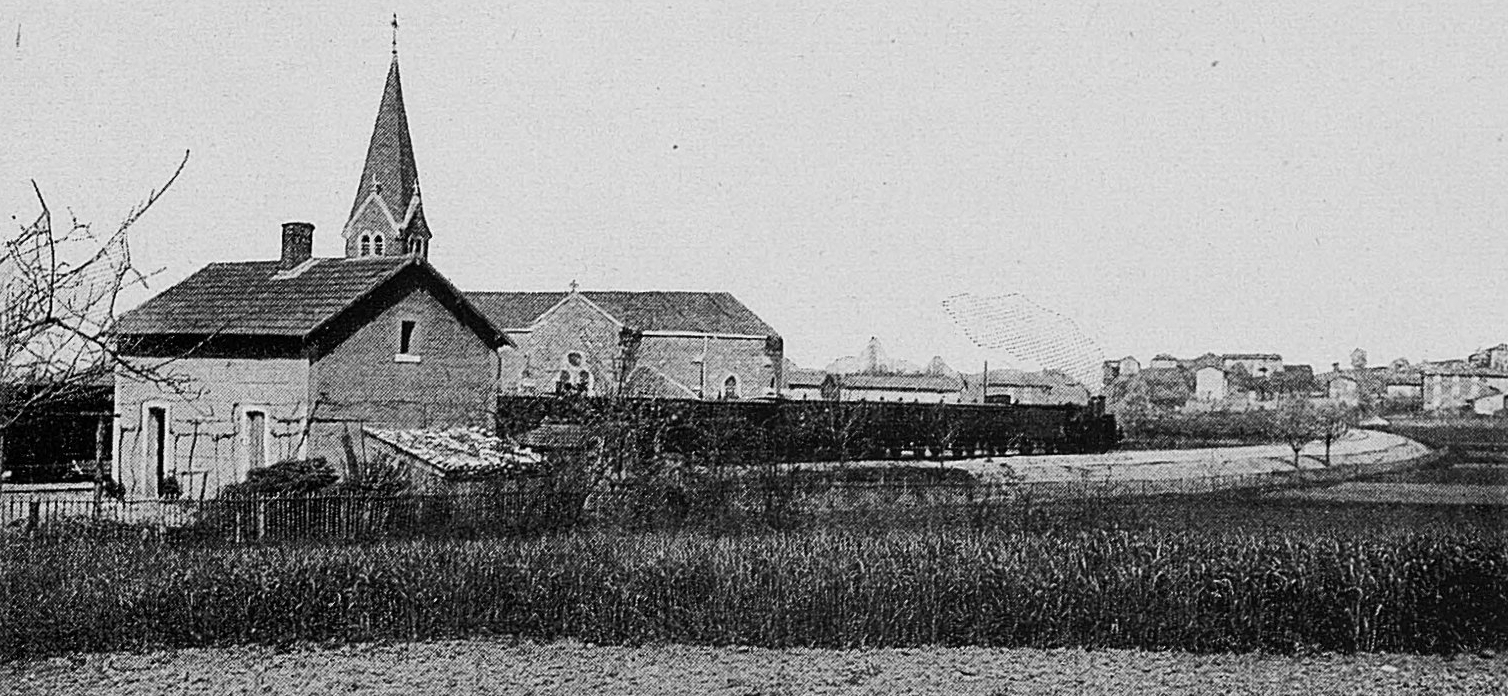
- Fleurieu-sur-Saône at the start of the 20th century

- Coat of arms
- Location of Fleurieu-sur-Saône
- Location within France Location within Auvergne-Rhône-Alpes
- Coordinates: 45°51′40″N 4°50′49″E
- Country: France
- Region: Auvergne-Rhône-Alpes
- Metropolis: Lyon Metropolis
- Arrondissement: Lyon

Government
  - Mayor (2020–2026): Gérard Berrucaz
- Area^{1}: 2.91 km^{2} (1.12 sq mi)
- Elevation: 165 m (541 ft)
- Highest elevation: 295 m (968 ft)
- Lowest elevation: 167 m (548 ft)
- Population (2023): 1,597
  - Density: 549/km^{2} (1,420/sq mi)
- Time zone: UTC+01:00 (CET)
  - Summer (DST): UTC+02:00 (CEST)
- INSEE/Postal code: 69085 /69250
- ^{1} French Land Register data, which excludes lakes, ponds, glaciers > 1 km^{2} (0.386 sq mi or 247 acres) and river estuaries.

Fleurieu-sur-Saône (French pronunciation: [flœʁjø syʁ son], literally Fleurieu on Saône) is a commune in the Metropolis of Lyon in Auvergne-Rhône-Alpes region in eastern France.
