= Charly, Metropolis of Lyon =

Charly
- Commune
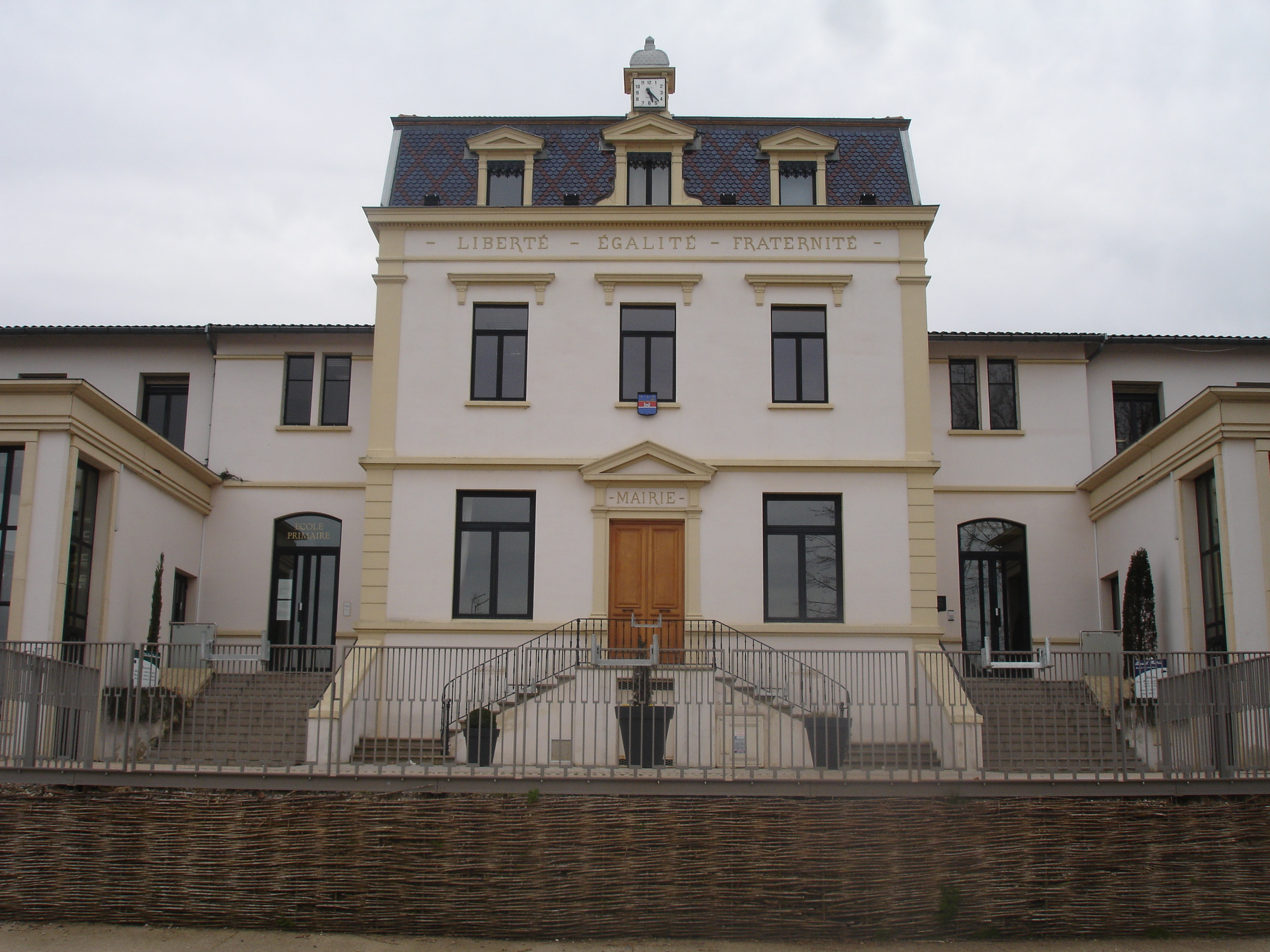
- The town hall of Charly
- Location of Charly
- Location within France Location within Auvergne-Rhône-Alpes
- Coordinates: 45°38′59″N 4°47′43″E
- Country: France
- Region: Auvergne-Rhône-Alpes
- Metropolis: Lyon Metropolis
- Arrondissement: Lyon

Government
  - Mayor (2020–2026): Olivier Araujo
- Area^{1}: 5.09 km^{2} (1.97 sq mi)
- Elevation: 250 m (820 ft)
- Highest elevation: 305 m (1,001 ft)
- Lowest elevation: 205 m (673 ft)
- Population (2023): 4,811
  - Density: 945/km^{2} (2,450/sq mi)
- Time zone: UTC+01:00 (CET)
  - Summer (DST): UTC+02:00 (CEST)
- INSEE/Postal code: 69046 /69390
- ^{1} French Land Register data, which excludes lakes, ponds, glaciers > 1 km^{2} (0.386 sq mi or 247 acres) and river estuaries.

Charly (French pronunciation: [ʃaʁli]) is a commune in the Metropolis of Lyon in Auvergne-Rhône-Alpes region in eastern France.

It is a suburb of the city of Lyon.

== Population ==
Historical population
Year	Pop.	±% p.a.
1968	1,648	—
1975	2,392	+5.47%
1982	2,864	+2.61%
1990	3,233	+1.53%
1999	3,874	+2.03%
2007	4,246	+1.15%
2012	4,470	+1.03%
2017	4,541	+0.32%
2023	4,811	+0.97%
Source: INSEE
