= Couzon-au-Mont-d'Or =

- Commune
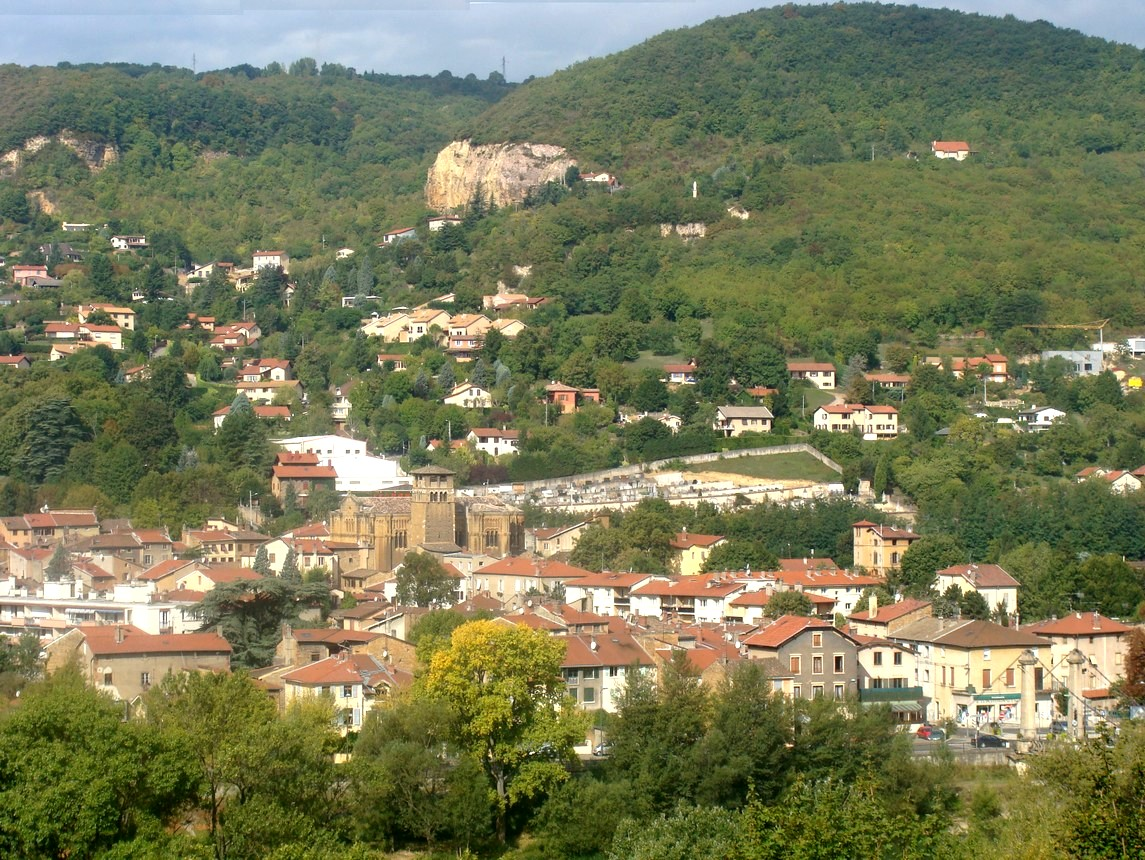
- A general view of Couzon

- Coat of arms
- Location of Couzon-au-Mont-d'Or
- Location within France Location within Auvergne-Rhône-Alpes
- Coordinates: 45°50′43″N 4°49′47″E
- Country: France
- Region: Auvergne-Rhône-Alpes
- Metropolis: Lyon Metropolis
- Arrondissement: Lyon

Government
  - Mayor (2020–2026): Patrick Véron
- Area^{1}: 3.11 km^{2} (1.20 sq mi)
- Elevation: 175 m (574 ft)
- Highest elevation: 498 m (1,634 ft)
- Lowest elevation: 168 m (551 ft)
- Population (2023): 2,619
  - Density: 842/km^{2} (2,180/sq mi)
- Time zone: UTC+01:00 (CET)
  - Summer (DST): UTC+02:00 (CEST)
- INSEE/Postal code: 69068 /69270
- ^{1} French Land Register data, which excludes lakes, ponds, glaciers > 1 km^{2} (0.386 sq mi or 247 acres) and river estuaries.

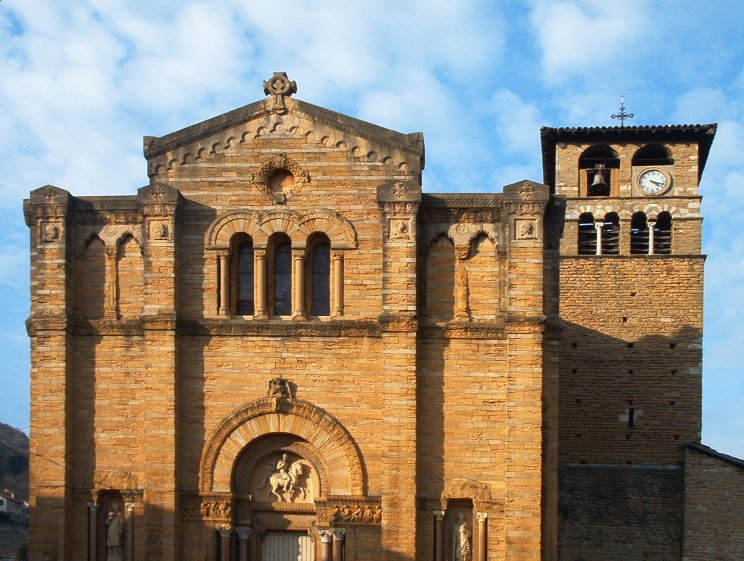
The church

Couzon-au-Mont-d'Or (French pronunciation: [kuzɔ̃ o mɔ̃ dɔʁ]; Arpitan: Coson) is a commune in the Metropolis of Lyon in the Auvergne-Rhône-Alpes region in eastern France.

== Population ==
Historical population
Year	Pop.	±% p.a.
1968	1,928	—
1975	2,434	+3.39%
1982	2,421	−0.08%
1990	2,564	+0.72%
1999	2,609	+0.19%
2007	2,564	−0.22%
2012	2,574	+0.08%
2017	2,516	−0.45%
2023	2,619	+0.67%
Source: INSEE
