= Curis-au-Mont-d'Or =

- Commune
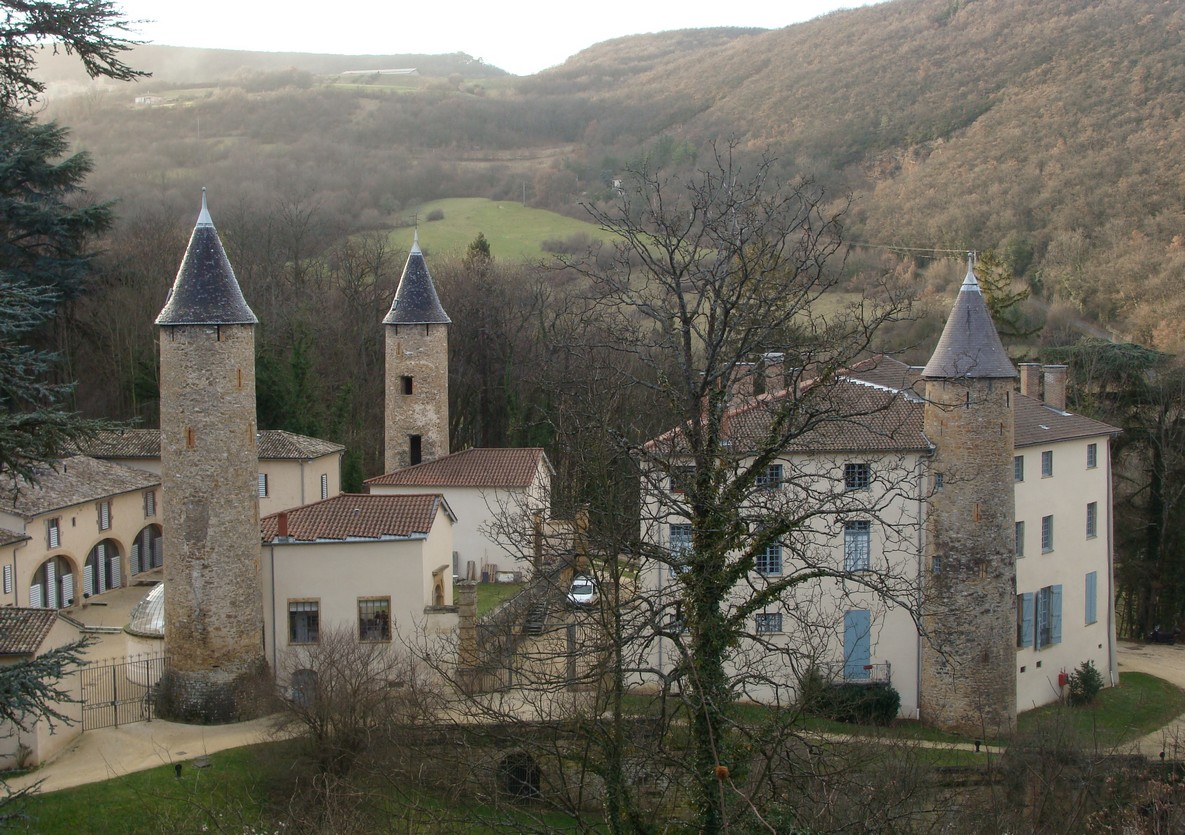
- The Château de la Trolanderie in Curis

- Coat of arms
- Location of Curis-au-Mont-d'Or
- Location within France Location within Auvergne-Rhône-Alpes
- Coordinates: 45°52′16″N 4°49′16″E
- Country: France
- Region: Auvergne-Rhône-Alpes
- Metropolis: Lyon Metropolis
- Arrondissement: Lyon

Government
  - Mayor (2026–32): Jean-Luc Poirier
- Area^{1}: 3.03 km^{2} (1.17 sq mi)
- Elevation: 176 m (577 ft)
- Highest elevation: 440 m (1,440 ft)
- Lowest elevation: 168 m (551 ft)
- Population (2023): 1,195
  - Density: 394/km^{2} (1,020/sq mi)
- Time zone: UTC+01:00 (CET)
  - Summer (DST): UTC+02:00 (CEST)
- INSEE/Postal code: 69071 /69250
- ^{1} French Land Register data, which excludes lakes, ponds, glaciers > 1 km^{2} (0.386 sq mi or 247 acres) and river estuaries.

Curis-au-Mont-d'Or (French pronunciation: [kyʁis o mɔ̃ dɔʁ]) is a commune in the Metropolis of Lyon in Auvergne-Rhône-Alpes region in eastern France.
