= Metropolis of Lyon =

Metropolis of Lyon Métropole de Lyon (French)
- Territorial collectivity

- Location of metropolitan Lyon in metropolitan France

- The city (commune) of Lyon (in red) and 58 suburban communes (in blue) make up the metropolitan region.
- Coordinates: 45°45′27″N 4°51′14″E
- Country: France
- Region: Auvergne-Rhône-Alpes
- Prefecture: Lyon

Government
  - President of the metropolitan council: Véronique Sarselli (LR)

Area
  - Total: 533.68 km^{2} (206.05 sq mi)

Population (2023)
  - Total: 1,436,354
  - Rank: 11th
  - Density: 2,691.4/km^{2} (6,970.7/sq mi)

GDP
  - Metro: €98.429 billion (2021)
- Time zone: UTC+1 (CET)
  - Summer (DST): UTC+2 (CEST)
- Department number: 69M
- Arrondissements: 1
- Cantons: None
- Communes: 58
- Website: www.grandlyon.com

The Metropolis of Lyon (French: Métropole de Lyon, pronounced [metʁɔpɔl də ljɔ̃]), also known as Grand Lyon ([ɡʁɑ̃ ljɔ̃], 'Greater Lyon'), is a French territorial collectivity in the east-central region of Auvergne-Rhône-Alpes. It is a directly-elected metropolitan authority, encompassing both the city of Lyon and most of its suburbs. It has jurisdiction both as a department, and as a metropolis, which excludes its territory from direct responsibility to the Rhône department. It had a population of 1,436,354 in 2023, 36.1% of whom lived in the city of Lyon proper.

It replaced the Urban Community of Lyon on 1 January 2015, in accordance with the MAPAM law (fr) enacted in January 2014. The first direct metropolitan elections were held in March (1st round) and June (2nd round) 2020, leading to a victory by The Ecologists. The president of the metropolitan council was Bruno Bernard, succeeded in 2026 by Véronique Sarselli of The Republicans.

== Geography ==
The Metropolis of Lyon covers an area of 533.7 km^{2} (206.1 sq mi). It covers the city of Lyon and its main suburbs. The rivers Rhône and Saône flow through it. It borders the department Rhône to the northwest and southwest, Ain to the northeast, and Isère to the southeast.

=== Communes ===
The Metropolis of Lyon consists of 58 communes. The most populous commune is Lyon. As of 2023, there are 10 communes with more than 30,000 inhabitants:

Commune	Population (2023)
Lyon	519,127
Villeurbanne	163,684
Vénissieux	65,502
Vaulx-en-Velin	53,069
Saint-Priest	49,229
Caluire-et-Cuire	43,597
Bron	42,982
Oullins-Pierre-Bénite	38,168
Meyzieu	36,687
Rillieux-la-Pape	31,389

== See also ==
- Metropolitan Council of Lyon
- Parks in Lyon
