= Décines-Charpieu =

Suburb of Lyon, France

- Commune
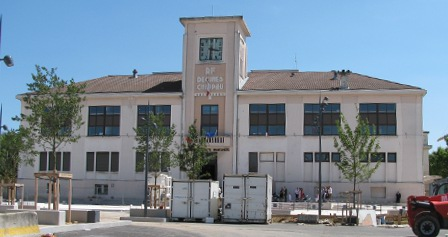
- The Hôtel de Ville

- Coat of arms
- Location of Décines-Charpieu
- Location within France Location within Auvergne-Rhône-Alpes
- Coordinates: 45°46′10″N 4°57′34″E
- Country: France
- Region: Auvergne-Rhône-Alpes
- Metropolis: Lyon Metropolis
- Arrondissement: Lyon

Government
  - Mayor (2020–2026): Laurence Fautra (LR)
- Area^{1}: 17.01 km^{2} (6.57 sq mi)
- Highest elevation: 240 m (790 ft)
- Lowest elevation: 171 m (561 ft)
- Population (2023): 29,877
  - Density: 1,756/km^{2} (4,549/sq mi)
- Demonym: Décinois
- Time zone: UTC+01:00 (CET)
  - Summer (DST): UTC+02:00 (CEST)
- INSEE/Postal code: 69275 /69150
- Website: www.decines-charpieu.fr
- ^{1} French Land Register data, which excludes lakes, ponds, glaciers > 1 km^{2} (0.386 sq mi or 247 acres) and river estuaries.

Décines-Charpieu (French pronunciation: [desinʃaʁpjø]) is a commune in the Metropolis of Lyon in the Auvergne-Rhône-Alpes region in central-eastern France. The name of the city is often shortened and simply called Décines.

== Geography ==
The centre of Décines is located southwest of the Grand-Large reservoir. The commune is divided in two by the Canal de Jonage, a deviation of the Rhône, on which the reservoir was formed. The centre of Lyon is located 12 km (7.4 mi) west. The surrounding communes are:

- Chassieu
- Bron
- Vaulx-en-Velin
- Meyzieu

== History ==
The Hôtel de Ville was completed in 1932.

Décines-Charpieu left the department of Isère and joined the department of Rhône on 21 February 1968 to become a member of the Urban Community of Lyon per 1 January 1969. On 1 January 2015, it administratively left the department of Rhône to join the newly-formed Metropolis of Lyon.

== Transport ==
Décines-Charpieu is served by Lyon tramway Lines 3 and 7.

== Population ==
Historical population

Year	Pop.	±% p.a.
1793	406	—
1800	503	+3.11%
1806	620	+3.55%
1821	735	+1.14%
1831	832	+1.25%
1836	769	−1.56%
1841	860	+2.26%
1846	984	+2.73%
1851	976	−0.16%
1856	1,027	+1.02%
1861	1,082	+1.05%
1866	1,094	+0.22%
1872	1,106	+0.18%
1876	1,047	−1.36%
1881	997	−0.97%
1886	1,085	+1.71%
1891	1,077	−0.15%
1896	1,220	+2.52%
1901	1,159	−1.02%

Year	Pop.	±% p.a.
1906	1,062	−1.73%
1911	1,130	+1.25%
1921	1,618	+3.65%
1926	3,602	+17.36%
1931	6,942	+14.02%
1936	6,078	−2.62%
1946	6,445	+0.59%
1954	7,546	+1.99%
1962	10,931	+4.74%
1968	15,297	+5.76%
1975	20,031	+3.93%
1982	22,832	+1.89%
1990	24,564	+0.92%
1999	24,193	−0.17%
2007	24,952	+0.39%
2012	25,912	+0.76%
2017	28,602	+2.00%
2023	29,877	+0.73%

Source: EHESS and INSEE (1968–2023)

== Education ==
As of 2009 there were nine public preschools (maternelles), nine public elementary schools (some preschools and elementary schools are grouped into combined primary schools), two public junior high schools (Collège Georges Brassens and Collège Maryse Bastie), and one public senior high school/sixth-form college (Lycée d'Enseignement Polyvalent Chaplin-Becquerel).

There is one Catholic private day school, École maternelle/primaire/Collège Jeanne d'Arc.

There is an Islamic day school, Groupe scolaire Al Kindi.

== Sport ==
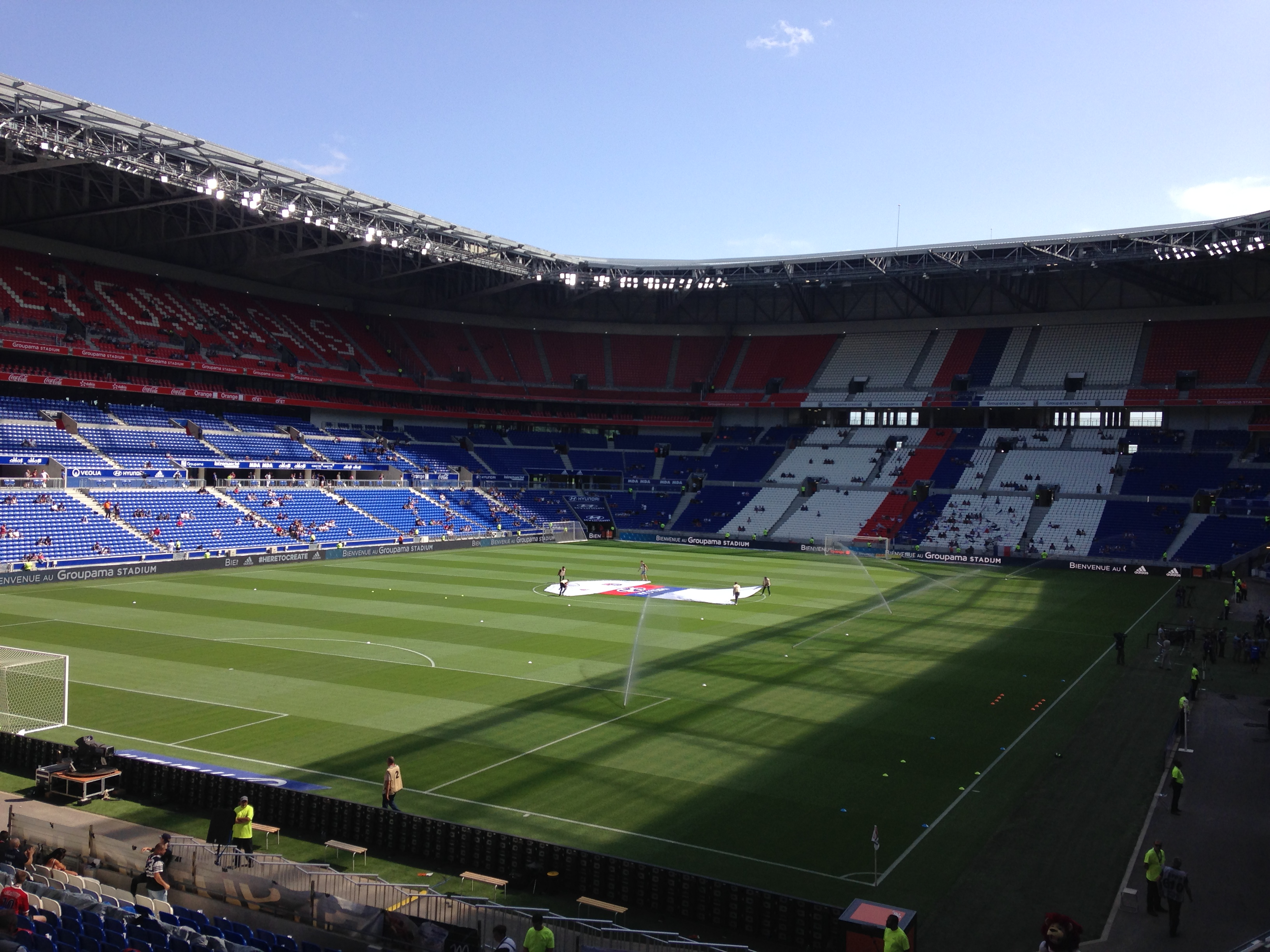
Parc Olympique Lyonnais

The stadium of Olympique Lyonnais, Parc Olympique Lyonnais, is located in Décines-Charpieu. It is the home venue of Ligue 1 club Lyon as well as hosting several UEFA Women's Champions League matches for the club's women's team. The stadium held several matches of UEFA Euro 2016 including a semi-final. It has hosted the 2017 Coupe de la Ligue Final, the 2018 UEFA Europa League Final, and the 2019 FIFA Women's World Cup Final and semi-finals.

The stadium has also hosted several rugby union matches, including the Rugby Champions Cup, Rugby Challenge Cup finals of 2016, and the 2023 Rugby World Cup.

Parc Olympique Lyonnais hosted the men and women's football tournaments at the 2024 Summer Olympics. It also hosted the WWE Backlash France event on 4 May 2024.

== Sites ==
- Maison de la culture arménienne de Décines
- Mémorial du génocide arménien de Décines-Charpieu

== Notable people ==
- Cédric Bardon, footballer
- Jean Djorkaeff, footballer
- Youri Djorkaeff, footballer
- Abdelkader Ghezzal, footballer
- Rachid Ghezzal, footballer
- Malo Gusto, footballer
- Thierry Hupond, bicycle racer
- Jonathan Leria, basketball player
- Malela Mutuale, basketball player
- Claire Pommet, singer-songwriter
- Kamel Ramdani, footballer
