= Hôtel de Ville, Décines-Charpieu =

Town hall in Décines-Charpieu, France

Hôtel de Ville
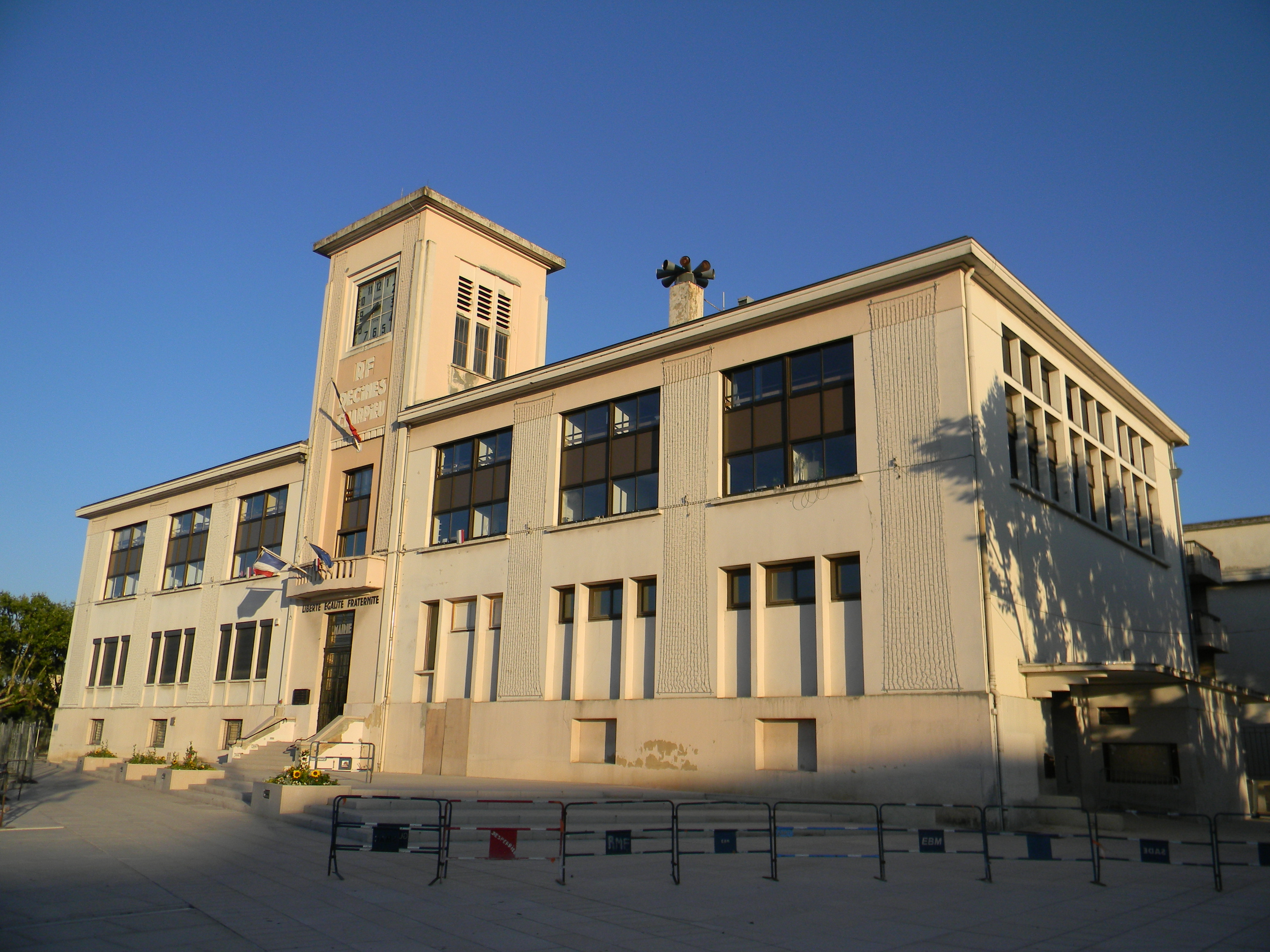
- The main frontage of the Hôtel de Ville in July 2012
- Interactive map of the Hôtel de Ville area

General information
- Type: City hall
- Architectural style: Modern style
- Location: Décines-Charpieu, France
- Coordinates: 45.7684°N 4.9570°E
- Completed: 1932

Design and construction
- Architect: André Teissier

The Hôtel de Ville (French pronunciation: [otɛl də vil], City Hall) is a municipal building in Décines-Charpieu, Metropolis of Lyon, in eastern France, standing on Place Roger Salengro.

== History ==
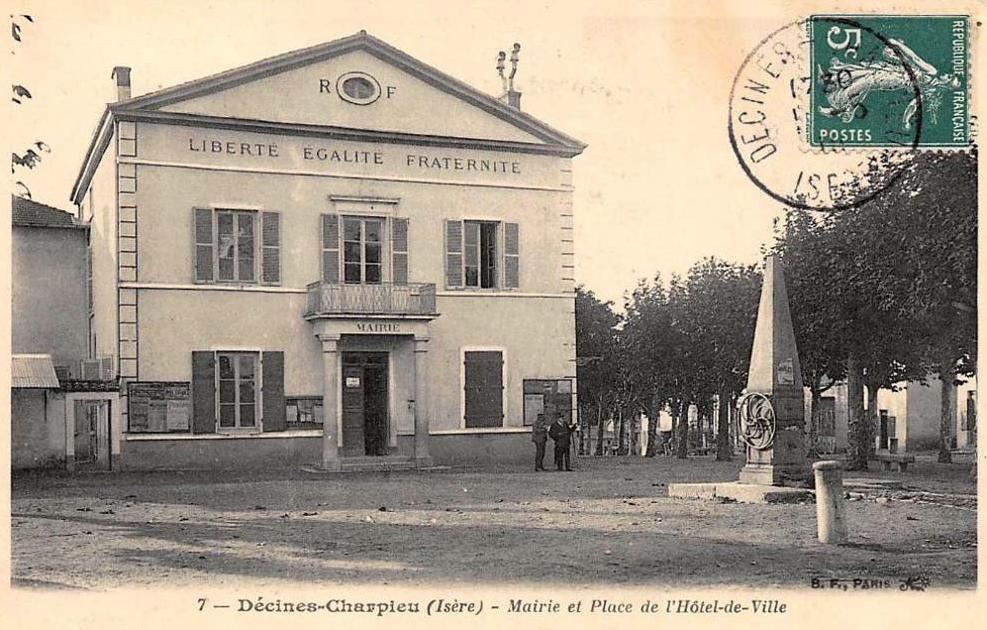
The old town hall

Following the French Revolution, the new town council initially met in the house of the mayor at the time. However, in 1840, they decided to commission a combined town hall and school. The site they selected was on the west side of the town square (now Place Henri Barbusse) facing the Church of Saint-Pierre in the old town area of Charpieu. The building was designed in the neoclassical style, built in brick with a cement render finish and was completed by 1856.

The design involved a symmetrical main frontage of three bays facing onto the square. The central bay featured a portico formed by a pair of Doric order columns supporting an entablature. There was a French door with a cornice and a balcony, fronted by iron railings, on the first floor. The outer bays were fenestrated by casement windows with shutters on both floors and, at roof level, there was a pediment with an oval oculus in the tympanum.

A war memorial, in the form of a slab of stone inscribed with the names of local service personnel who had died in the First World War and flanked by two female figures, was sculpted by Georges Salendre and was unveiled in front of the town hall in 1922. Following the liberation of the town by the US 36th Infantry Division on 3 September 1944, during the Second World War, local people gathered in front of the old town hall to celebrate. The old town hall later served as a town hall annex providing local services to that part of the town.

In the early 1930s, following significant population growth largely associated with the artificial silk industry, the council decided to commission a more substantial town hall. The site they selected was what is now Place Roger Salengro in the industrial centre of the town. The new building was designed by André Teissier in the modern style, built in stone and was officially opened on 25 September 1932.

The design involved a symmetrical main frontage of seven bays facing onto Place Roger Salengro. The central bay featured a three-stage tower: there was a short flight of steps leading up to a doorway in the first stage, a French door with a balcony in the second stage, and a clock in the third stage with a flat roof above. The other bays were fenestrated by tri-partite windows on the ground floor and by large casement windows on the first floor. Internally, the principal room was the Salle du Conseil (council chamber).
