= Vénissieux station =

Railway station in the Metropolis of Lyon, France

Coordinates: 45°42′19″N 4°53′17″E

Vénissieux
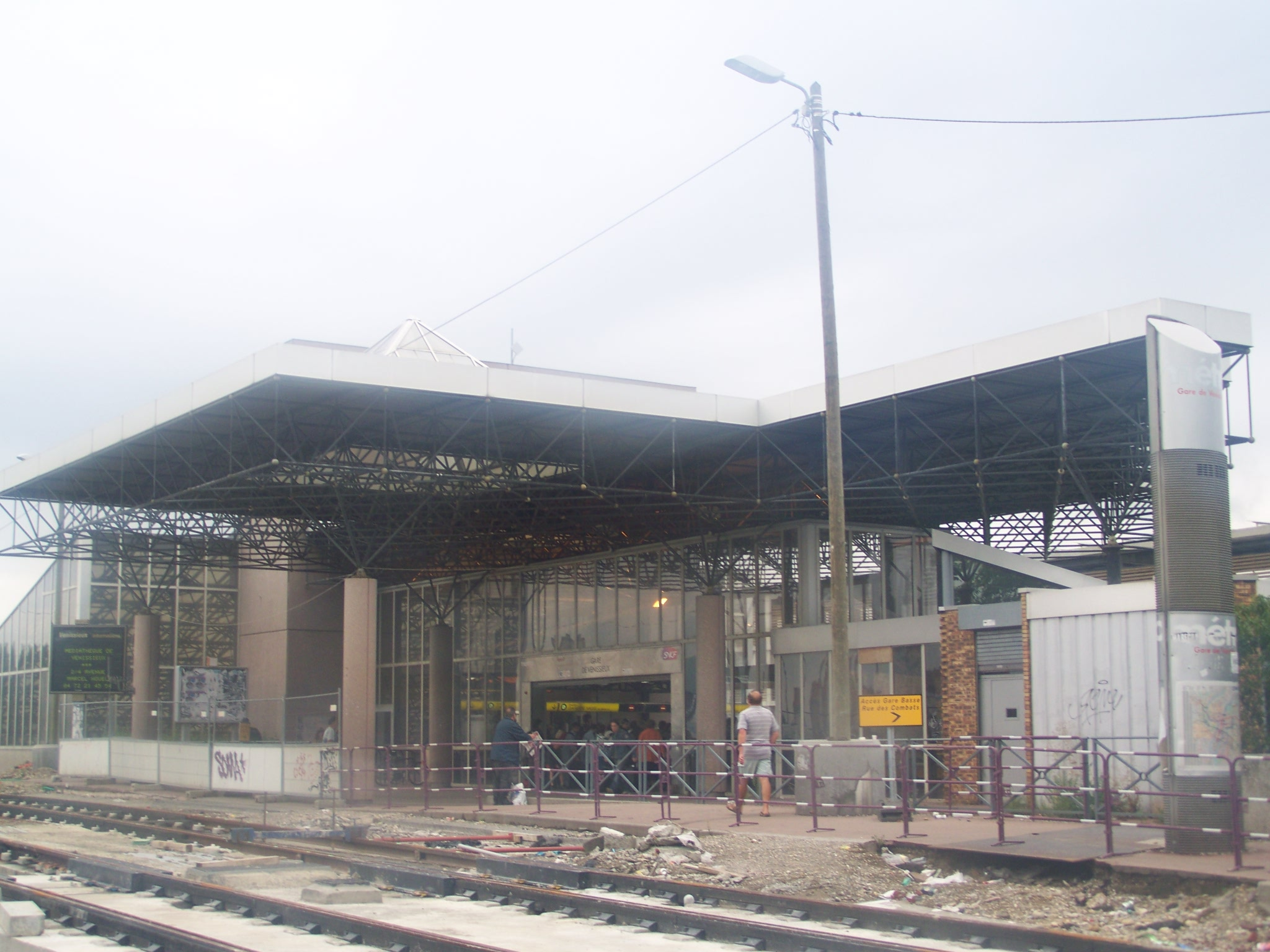
- Entrance of Vénissieux station in 2008

General information
- Location: Boulevard Ambroise Croizat, Vénissieux, Metropolis of Lyon; France
- Elevation: 186 m (610 ft)
- Owner: SNCF
- Operator: SNCF
- Line: Lyon–Marseille (via Grenoble)
- Platforms: 2 (including one island platform)
- Tracks: 3
- Connections: Lyon Metro Lyon Metro Line D Lyon tramway Lyon tramway#Line T4

Other information
- Station code: 87723320

History
- Opened: 1 July 1858

Passengers
- 2023: 191,194

Services
Preceding station	TER Auvergne-Rhône-Alpes	Following station
Lyon-Jean Macé towards Lyon-Perrache	1	Saint-Priest towards Saint-André-le-Gaz

Connections to other stations
Preceding station	Lyon Metro	Following station
Parilly towards Gare de Vaise–Gérard Collomb	Line D transfer at Gare de Vénissieux	Terminus
Preceding station	Lyon tramway	Following station
Croizat–Paul Bert towards Hôpital Feyzin Vénissieux	Line T4 transfer at Gare de Vénissieux	La Borelle towards La Doua–Gaston Berger
Terminus	Line T10 transfer at Gare de Vénissieux (starting from 2027)	Vénissieux–Émile Zola towards Halle Tony Garnier
Location

Vénissieux station (French: Gare de Vénissieux) is a railway station in the town Vénissieux, a suburb of Lyon, Lyon Metropolis, France. Opened on 1 July 1858, it is served by the SNCF's TER Auvergne-Rhône-Alpes.

The station is served by regional trains to Lyon, Bourgoin-Jallieu and Saint-André-le-Gaz.

== Local transport ==
It is well connected to local public transport. It is the southeastern terminus of Lyon Metro Line D as well as one of the main stops of Lyon tramway line T4.

A new tramway line T10 linking Vénissieux station to Halle Tony Garnier (7th arrondissement of Lyon) via Saint-Fons is currently under construction and is expected to open in 2026.

== Gallery ==
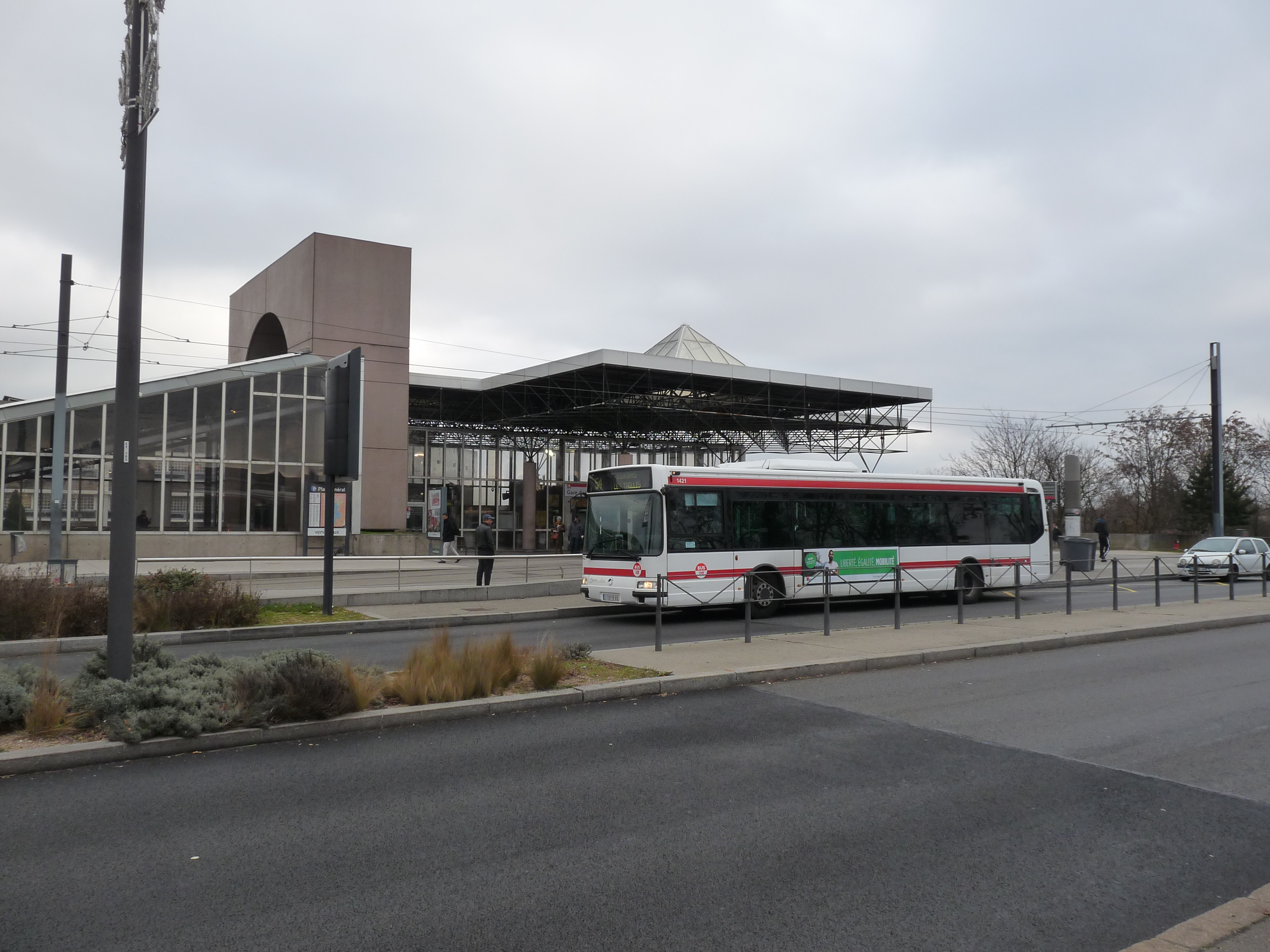
Vénissieux station in 2017

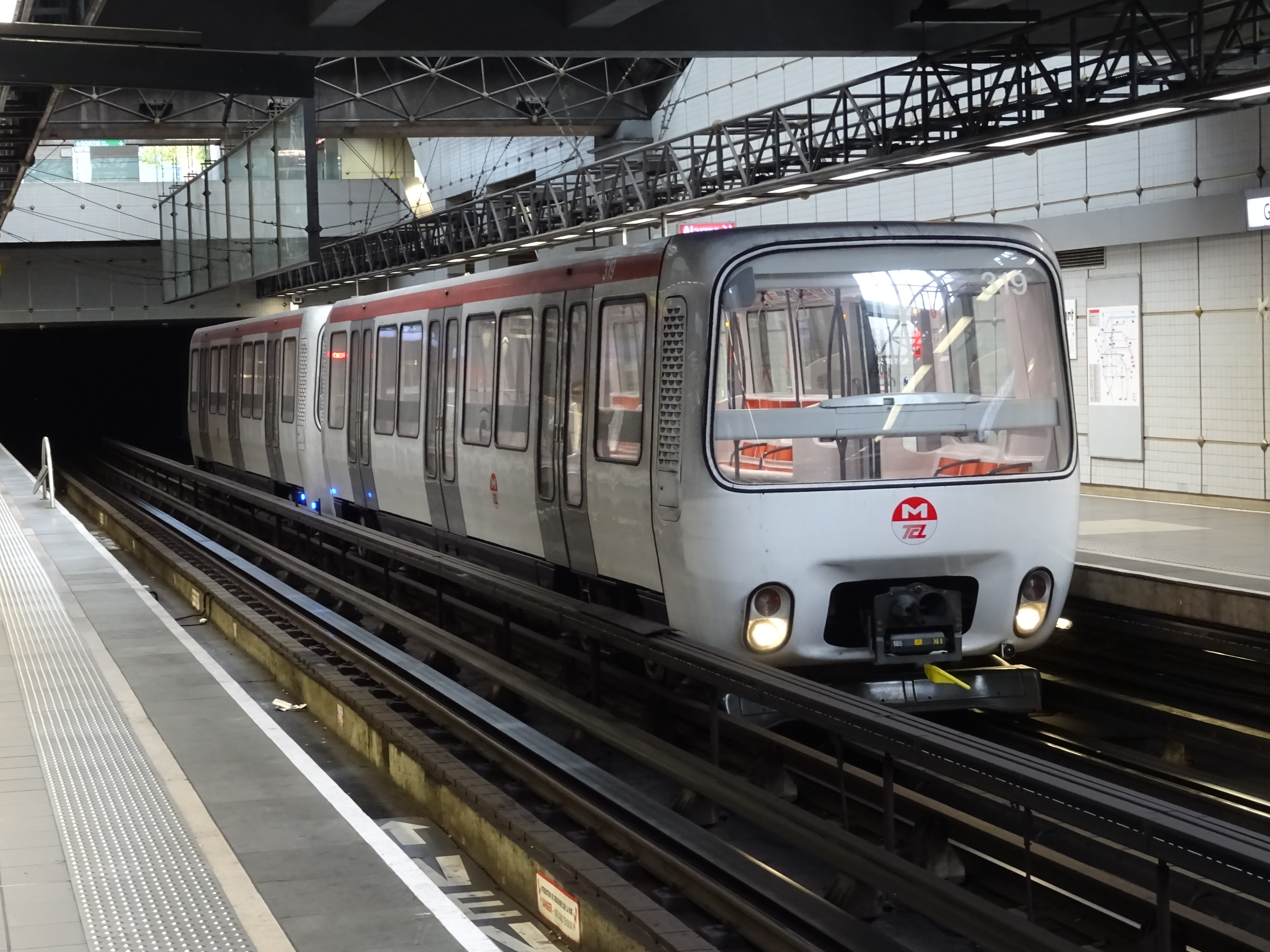
Métro line D station

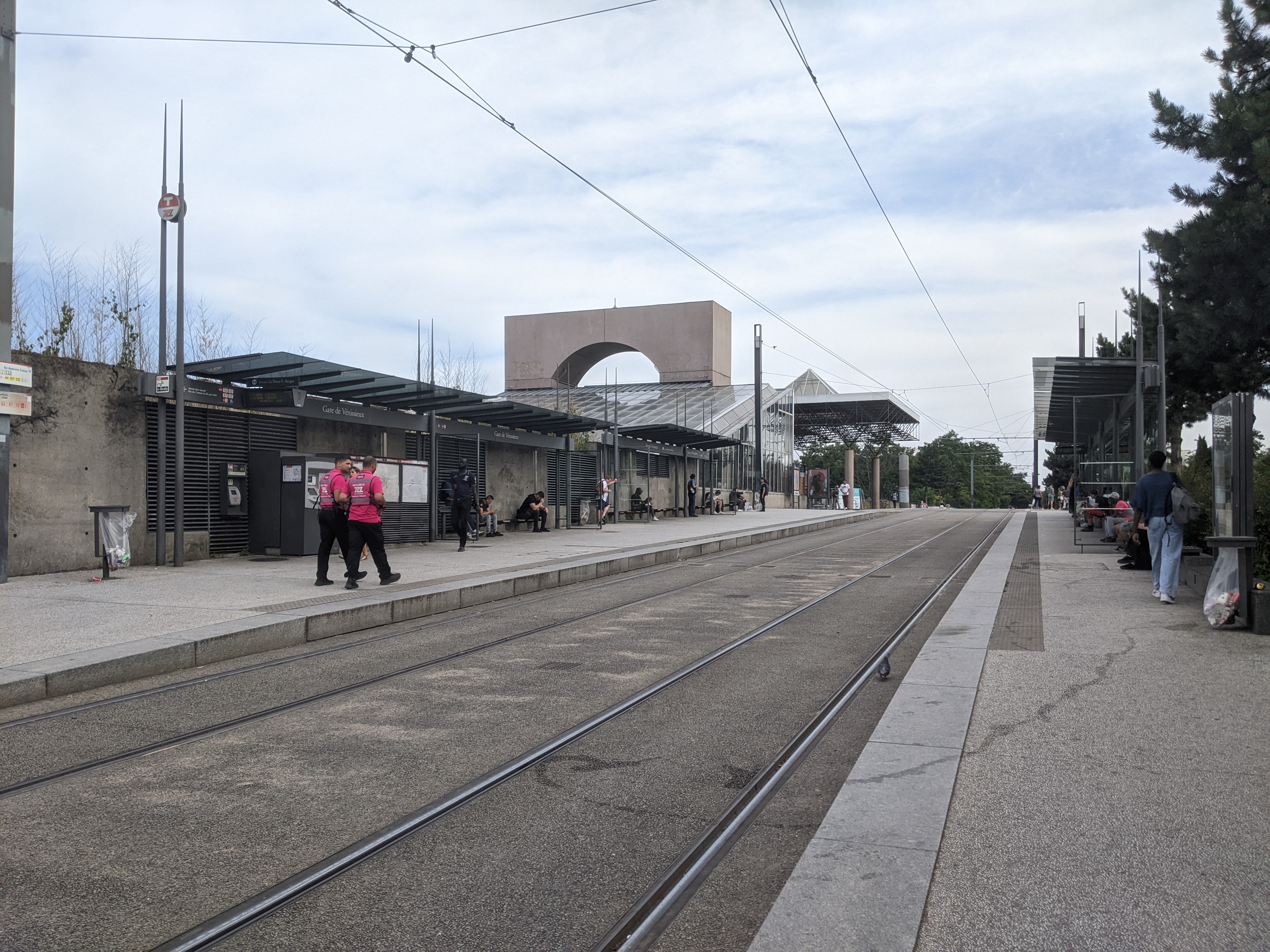
Tramway line T4 station
