= Lyon tramway =

City tramway system in France

Coordinates: 45°43′06″N 4°55′43″E

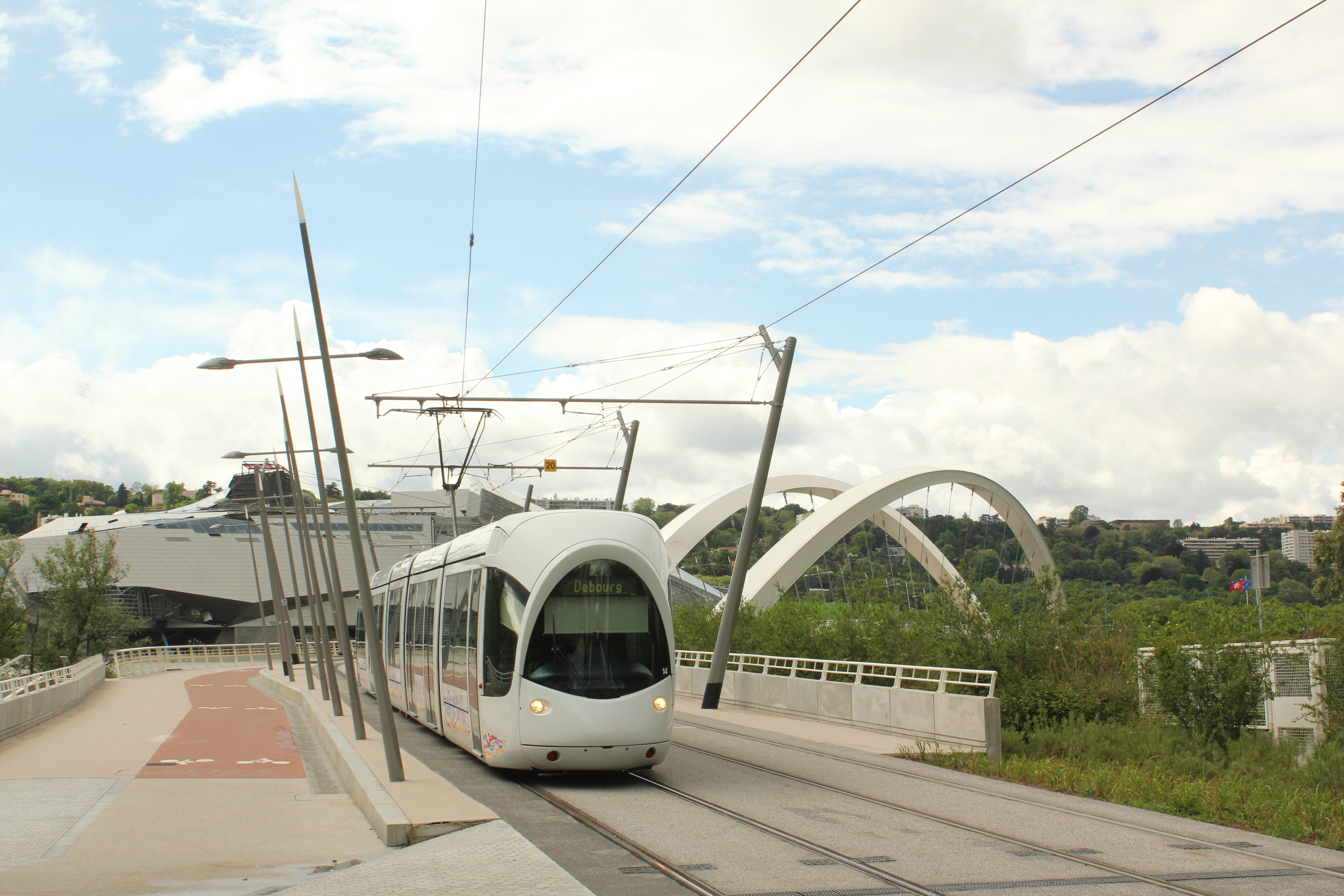

Overview
- Native name: Tramway de Lyon
- Owner: SYTRAL Mobilités (in French)
- Locale: Lyon, Auvergne-Rhône-Alpes, France
- Transit type: Light rail/tram
- Number of lines: 8 (T1-T7 & Rhônexpress)
- Number of stations: 103 (T1-T7 & Rhônexpress)
- Annual ridership: 96,449,142 (2019) (excluding Rhônexpress)

Operation
- Began operation: 2 January 2001
- Operators: TCL (T1-T7); Rhônexpress (Rhônexpress)

Technical
- System length: 73.1 km (45.4 mi) (T1-T7); 23 km (14 mi) (Rhônexpress)
- Track gauge: 1,435 mm (4 ft 8 1/2 in) standard gauge
System map
Map of Lyon rail public transit network

The Lyon tramway (French: Tramway de Lyon) comprises eight lines, seven lines operated by TCL and one by Rhônexpress, in the city of Lyon, France. The original tramway network in Lyon was developed in 1879; the modern network started operation in 2001.

Lines T1 and T2 opened in January 2001; T3 opened in December 2006; line T4 opened in April 2009; line Rhônexpress (airport connector) opened in August 2010; line T5 opened in November 2012; line T6 opened in November 2019 and line T7 opened in February 2021. The tramway system complements the Lyon Metro and forms an integral part of the public transportation system (TCL) in Lyon. The network of 7 tram lines (T1-T7) operated by TCL runs 66.3 kilometres (41.2 mi); the single line operated by Rhônexpress runs for 22 kilometres (14 mi) (including approximately 15 kilometres (9.3 mi) shared with the T3 tram line). The network is currently served by 73 Alstom Citadis 302 and 34 Alstom Citadis 402 trams.

== History: the original network (1879 - 1957) ==
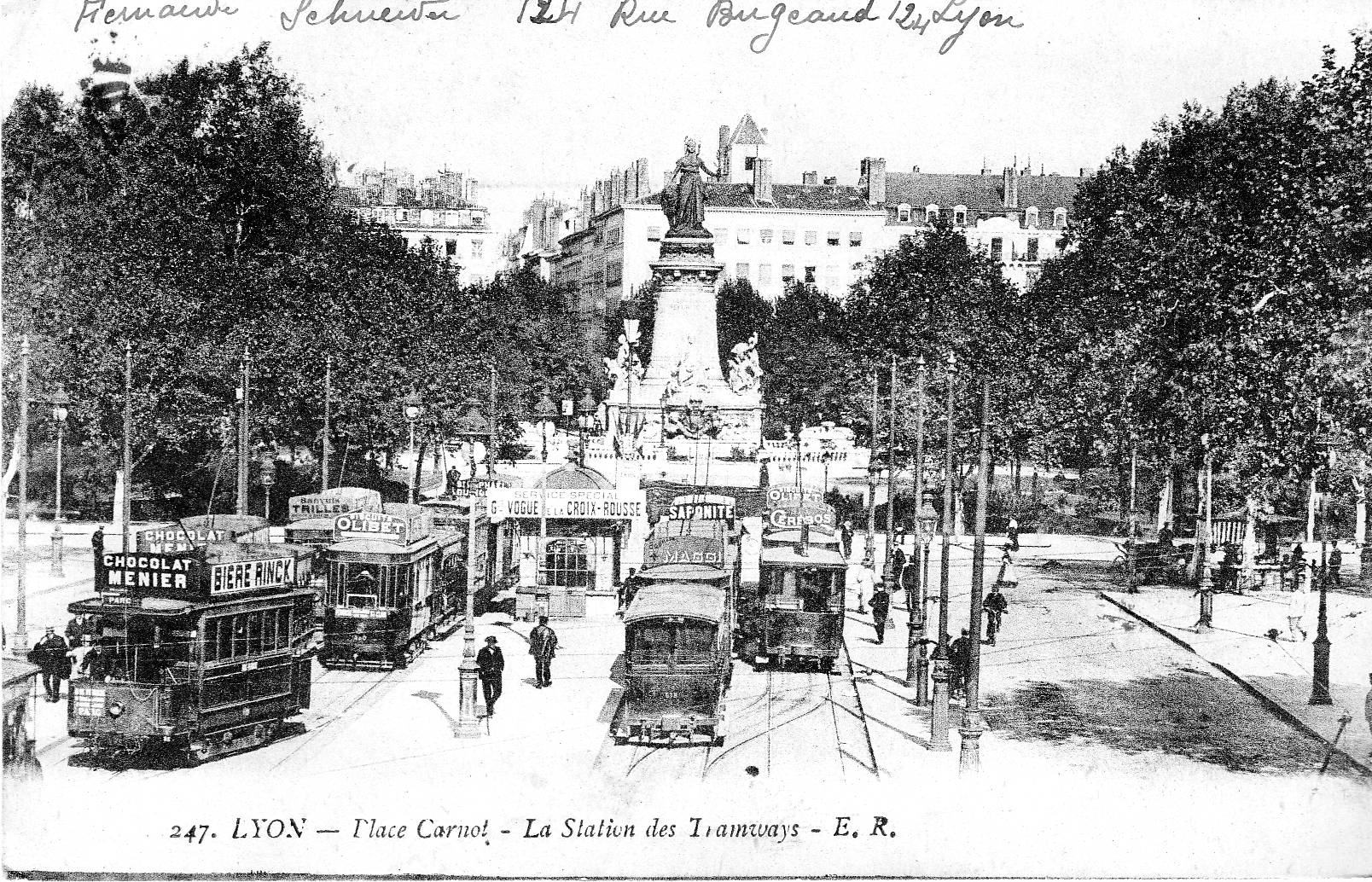
Tram station at Place Carnot at the beginning of the 20th century

The first steam-driven tram line, the number 12, linked Lyon and Vénissieux in 1888. The network was electrified between 1893 and 1899. Extensions to the suburbs were built until 1914. This was the height of the network - high quality service, low price, high frequency and high profitability for shareholders. The inflation between World War I and World War II made the network unprofitable. Beginning in the 1930s, tramways were progressively replaced with trolleybuses and later buses. A modernization plan, including underground sections in the city centre, planned in the 1940s was rapidly abandoned. The last urban tram ran on line 4 in January 1956 and the last suburban tram, the "Train bleu" in Neuville-sur-Saône, was abandoned in June 1957.

Animated map depicting the evolution of the rail infrasture, including the former and current tramway networks, in the greater Lyon region from 1860 to 2020.

=== Original OTL network ===
The first tram network was built and operated by the Compagnie des Omnibus et tramways de Lyon (OTL), founded in 1879. It consisted of ten 1,435 mm (4 ft 8 1/2 in) (standard gauge), horse-drawn lines with a total length of 44 km serving Lyon, Villeurbanne, La Mulatière et Oullins .

In 1894, new electric trams were in service with these lines:

- 1: Bellecour – Monplaisir via Pont de la Guillotière and Grande Rue de la Guillotière
- 2: Bellecour – Montchat
- 3: Cordeliers – Villeurbanne
- 4: Parc de la Tête d'or – La Mouche (now Jean Macé), extended to Perrache
- 5: Bellecour – Pont d'Écully via Pont du Change
- 6: Terreaux – Gare de Vaise via Quai Saint-Vincent
- 7: Perrache – Les Brotteaux via Pont Morand
- 8: Pont Morand – Saint-Clair
- 9: Bellecour – Saint-Paul via Pont Tilsitt (now Pont Bonaparte)
- 10: Bellecour – Oullins.

The first line to open was line 5, from Place Bellecour to Vaise along the Saône river, competing with riverboats. Lines 1 and 7 followed the approximate routes of the current metro lines D and A, respectively. The network was gradually extended, by the OTL and by acquisitions of competing operators, between 1894 and 1914.

=== OTL extensions ===
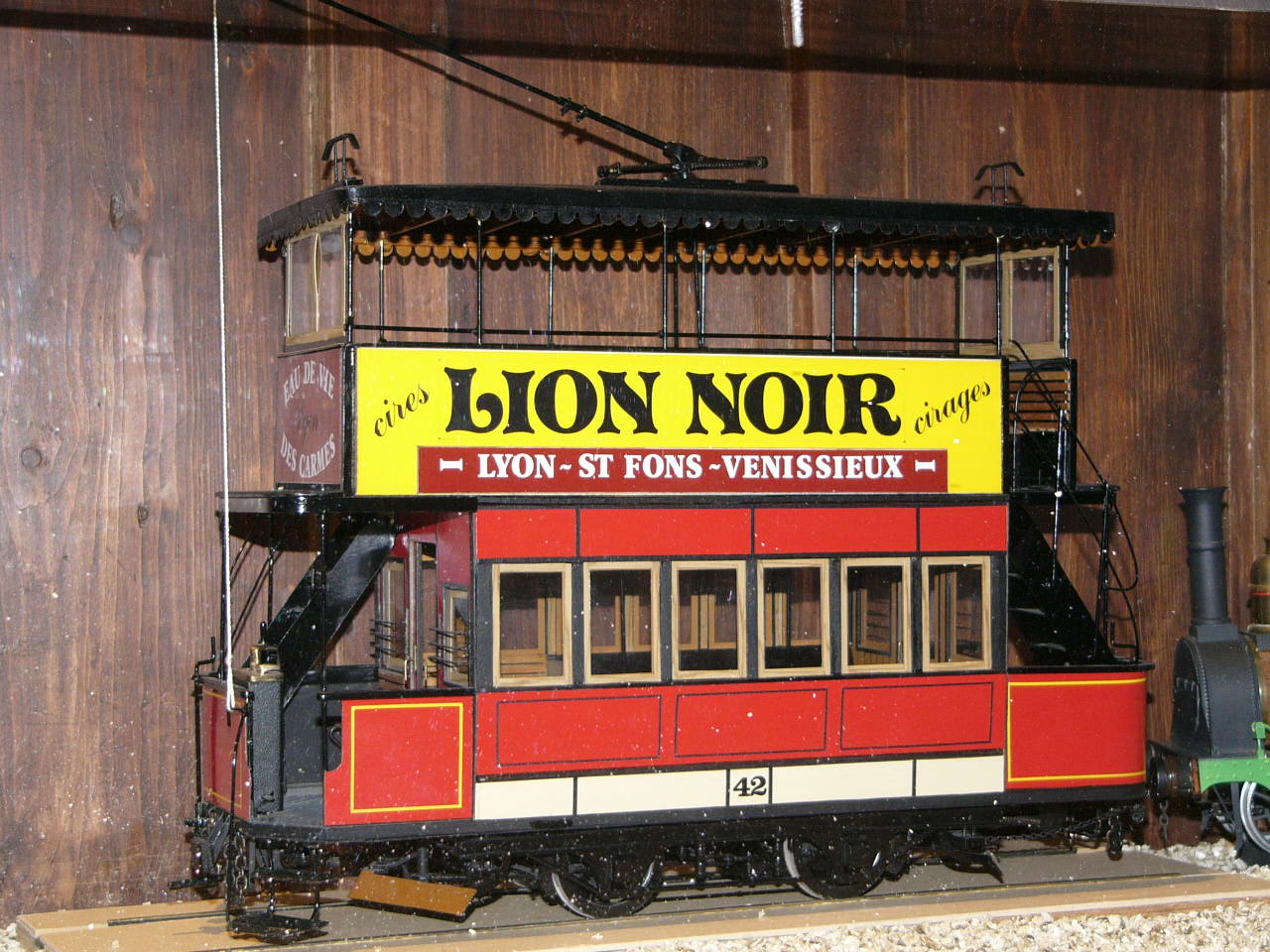
Tram from Line 12

- 11: Bellecour - Bon-Coin (Villeurbanne)
- 12: Bellecour - Saint-Fons, extended to Vénissieux
- 13: Cours Bayard (south of Perrache) - Place Commandant Arnaud (at the Croix-Rousse)
- 14: Pont d'Oullins - Chaponost
- 15: Charité - Pierre-Bénite
- 16: Bellecour - Meyzieu - La Balme (Isère)
- 17: Tolozan - Montluel (Ain)
- 18: Gare Saint-Paul - La Mouche, extended to Gerland
- 28: Cordeliers - Brotteaux
- 31: Pont-Mouton - Saint-Rambert-l'Île-Barbe
- 32: Charité - Vitriolerie.

=== La Société du Tramway d'Écully ===
1,000 mm (3 ft 3 3/8 in) (Metre gauge) lines to the northwest, acquired by the OTL in 1894.

- 19: Pont-Mouton - Écully
- 20: Pont-Mouton - Saint-Cyr-au-Mont-d'Or
- 21: Pont-Mouton - Champagne-au-Mont-d'Or, extended to Limonest.
- 22: Pont-Mouton - Saint-Didier-au-Mont-d'Or.

=== La Compagnie Lyonnaise des Tramways (CLT) ===
Metre gauge, steam powered lines on the left bank of the Rhône river. Became the Nouvelle Compagnie Lyonnaise des Tramways (NLT) in 1902, then acquired by the OTL in 1906.

- 23: Pont Lafayette - Cimetière de la Guillotière, extended to Monplaisir-la-Plaine. The extension of the line, electrified to Saint-Priest used the number 34 from 1925 to 1935.
- 24: Pont Lafayette - Asile de Bron, extended to Bron (Village).
- 25: Cordeliers - Montchat, extended to Genas.
- 26: Rue Casimir-Périer - Parc de la Tête d'Or
- 27: Cordeliers - Vaulx-en-Velin.

=== La Compagnie du Fourvière Ouest Lyonnais (FOL) ===
Fourvière and Saint-Just funiculars and trams in the west plateau. Acquired by the OTL in 1910.

- 29: Saint-Just - Sainte-Foy-lès-Lyon
- 30: Saint-Just - Francheville.

=== La Compagnie du Tramway de Caluire (CTC) ===
Acquired by the OTL in 1914. Originally metric gauge, converted to standard gauge in 1925.

- 33: Croix-Rousse - Caluire, extended to Les Marronniers (Fontaines-sur-Saône).

=== Tramway de l'Ouest du Dauphiné ===
This company reached Lyon in 1909. The meter gauge line leading to the east suburb was used on 6 km after being electrified in 1925.

- 34: Cordeliers - Saint-Priest

== The current network (since 2001) ==
Following a decline in the 1950s and 1960s, public transit in Lyon was revived in the 1970s with the opening of the Lyon Metro. In 1996 a decision was made to build a new tram network to complement the metro. The first two lines were opened on 2 January 2001: Line T1 from Perrache to IUT–Feyssine via Part-Dieu and Charpennes and line T2 from Perrache to Porte des Alpes via Jean Macé and Grange Blanche. Line T2 was extended to Saint-Priest–Bel Air on 27 October 2003 and line T1 was extended to Montrochet on 15 September 2005, then again to Debourg on 19 February 2014. Line T3 (codenamed LEA) was opened on 4 December 2006 along the former Chemin de Fer de l'Est Lyonnais tracks from Gare Part-Dieu–Villette to Meyzieu–ZI. Line T4 opened on 20 April 2009, running from Jet d'Eau–Mendès France to Hôpital Feyzin Vénissieux, and was extended to La Doua on 29 August 2013. Line T5 opened on 17 November 2012, running from Grange Blanche to Eurexpo.

=== Line T1 ===
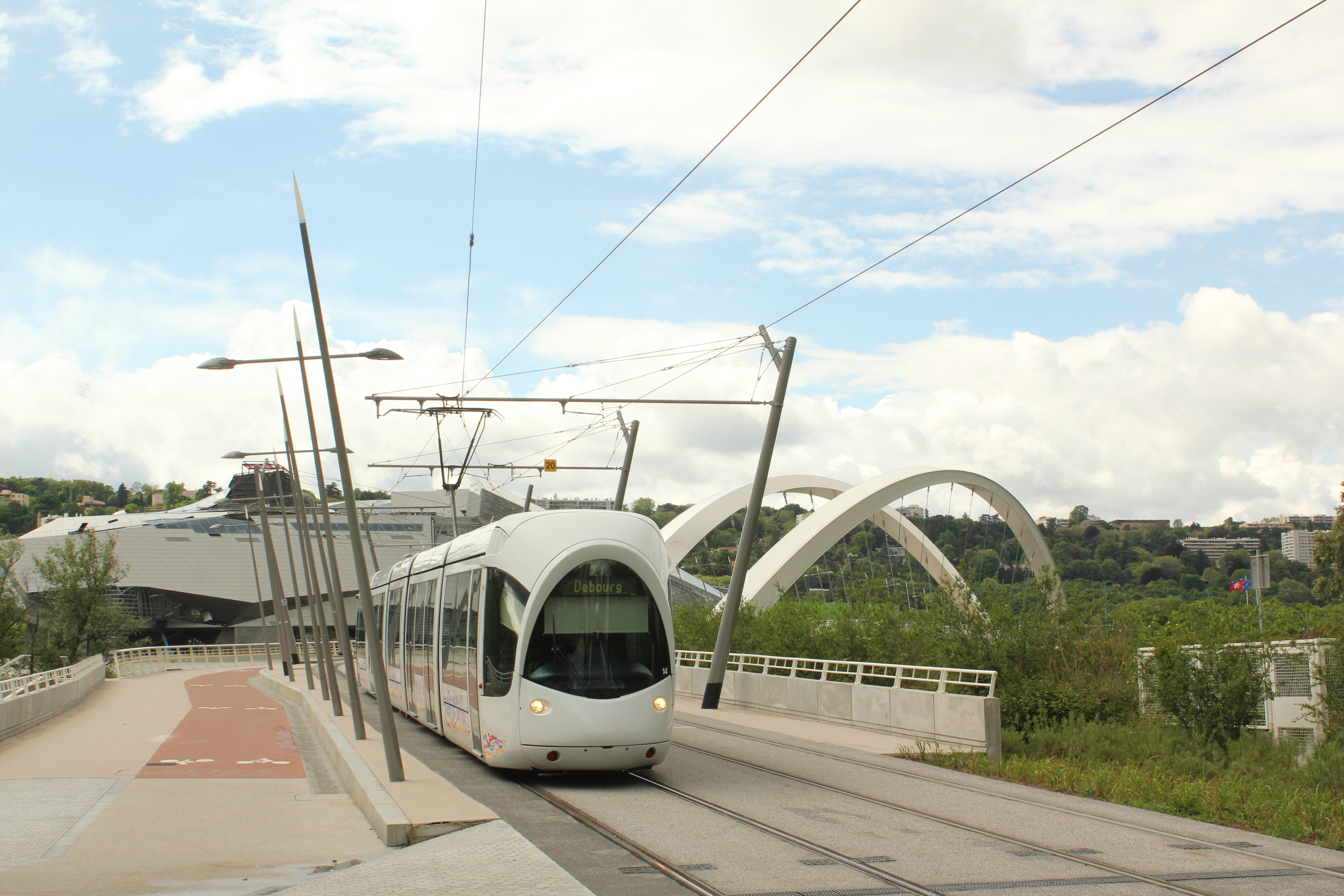
Line T1 on the Raymond Barre Bridge between Musée des Confluences and Halle Tony Garnier stations

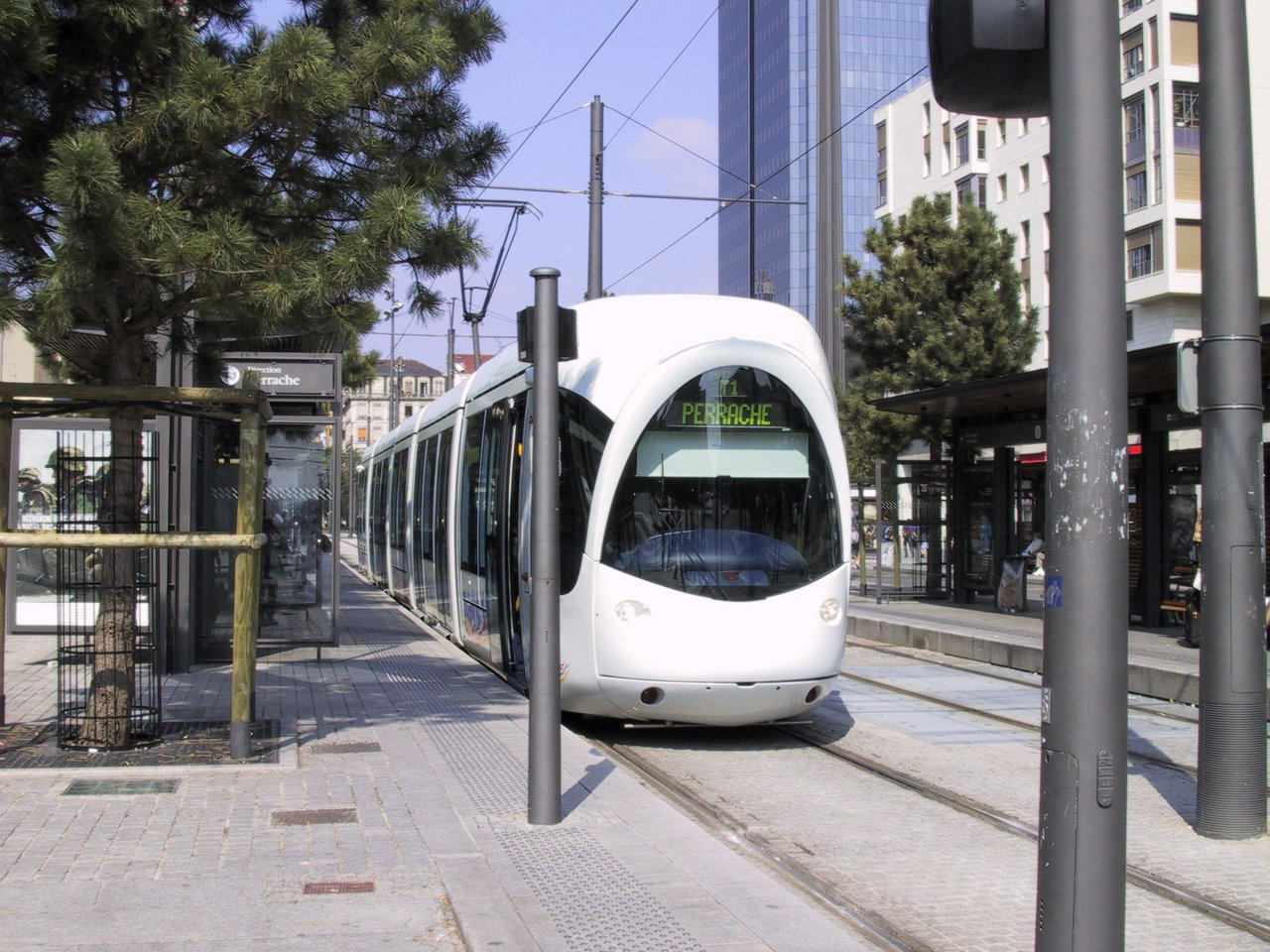
Line T1 at Gare Part-Dieu–Vivier Merle station in September 2002

Operates from 04:40 to 00:35, maintained by the Centre de Maintenance de Saint-Priest - Porte des Alpes.

- Debourg
- ENS Lyon
- Halle Tony Garnier
- Musée des Confluences
- Hôtel de Région–Montrochet
- Sainte-Blandine
- Place des Archives
- Perrache
- Quai Claude Bernard
- Rue de l'Université
- Saint-André
- Guillotière–Gabriel Péri
- Liberté
- Saxe–Préfecture
- Palais de Justice–Mairie du 3ème (connection at Place Guichard–Bourse du Travail with walking distance:)
- Part-Dieu–Auditorium
- Gare Part-Dieu–Vivier Merle (connections at Gare Part-Dieu–Villette with walking distance:)
- Thiers–Lafayette
- Collège Bellecombe
- Charpennes–Charles Hernu
- Le Tonkin
- Condorcet
- Université Lyon 1
- La Doua–Gaston Berger
- INSA–Einstein
- Croix-Luizet
- IUT–Feyssine

=== Line T2 ===
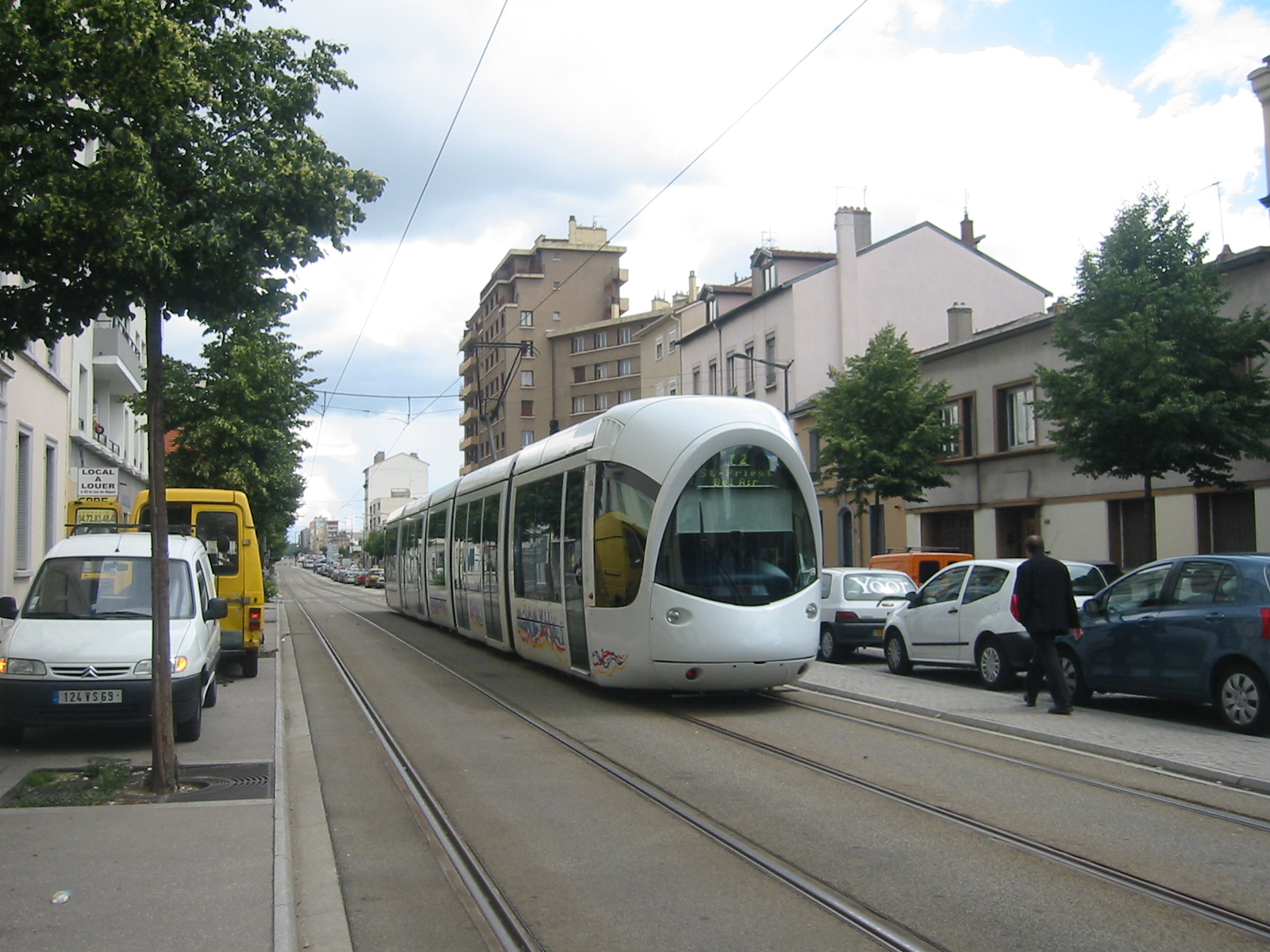
Line T2 near Route de Vienne station

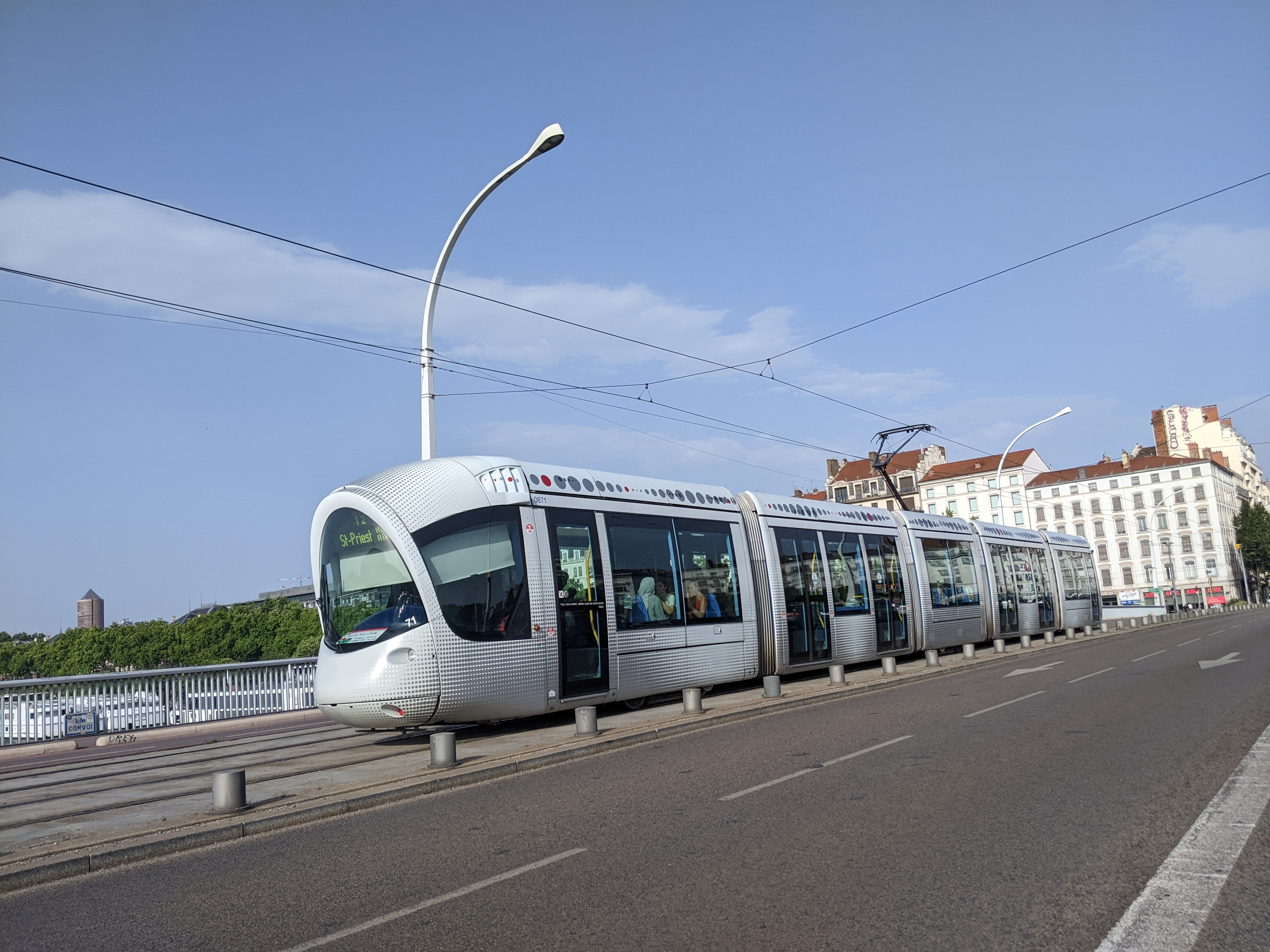
Line T2 on the Gallieni Bridge between Perrache and Centre Berthelot–Sciences Po Lyon stations

Operates from 04:55 to 00:34, maintained by the Centre de Maintenance de Saint-Priest - Porte des Alpes.

- Hôtel de Région–Montrochet
- Sainte-Blandine
- Place des Archives
- Perrache
- Centre Berthelot–Sciences Po Lyon
- Jean Macé
- Garibaldi–Berthelot
- Route de Vienne
- Jet d'Eau–Mendès France
- Villon (nearby at Lycée Lumière:)
- Bachut–Mairie du 8ème
- Jean XXIII–Maryse Bastié
- Grange Blanche
- Ambroise Paré
- Desgenettes
- Essarts–Iris
- Boutasse–Camille Rousset
- Hôtel de Ville–Bron
- Les Alizés
- Rebufer
- Parilly Université–Hippodrome
- Europe–Université
- Porte des Alpes
- Parc Technologique
- Hauts de Feuilly
- Salvador Allende
- Alfred de Vigny
- Saint-Priest–Hôtel de Ville
- Esplanade des Arts
- Jules Ferry
- Cordière
- Saint-Priest–Bel Air

Line T2 has been extended from Perrache to Hôtel de Région–Montrochet on 24 March 2021, sharing the track of line T1.

=== Line T3 ===
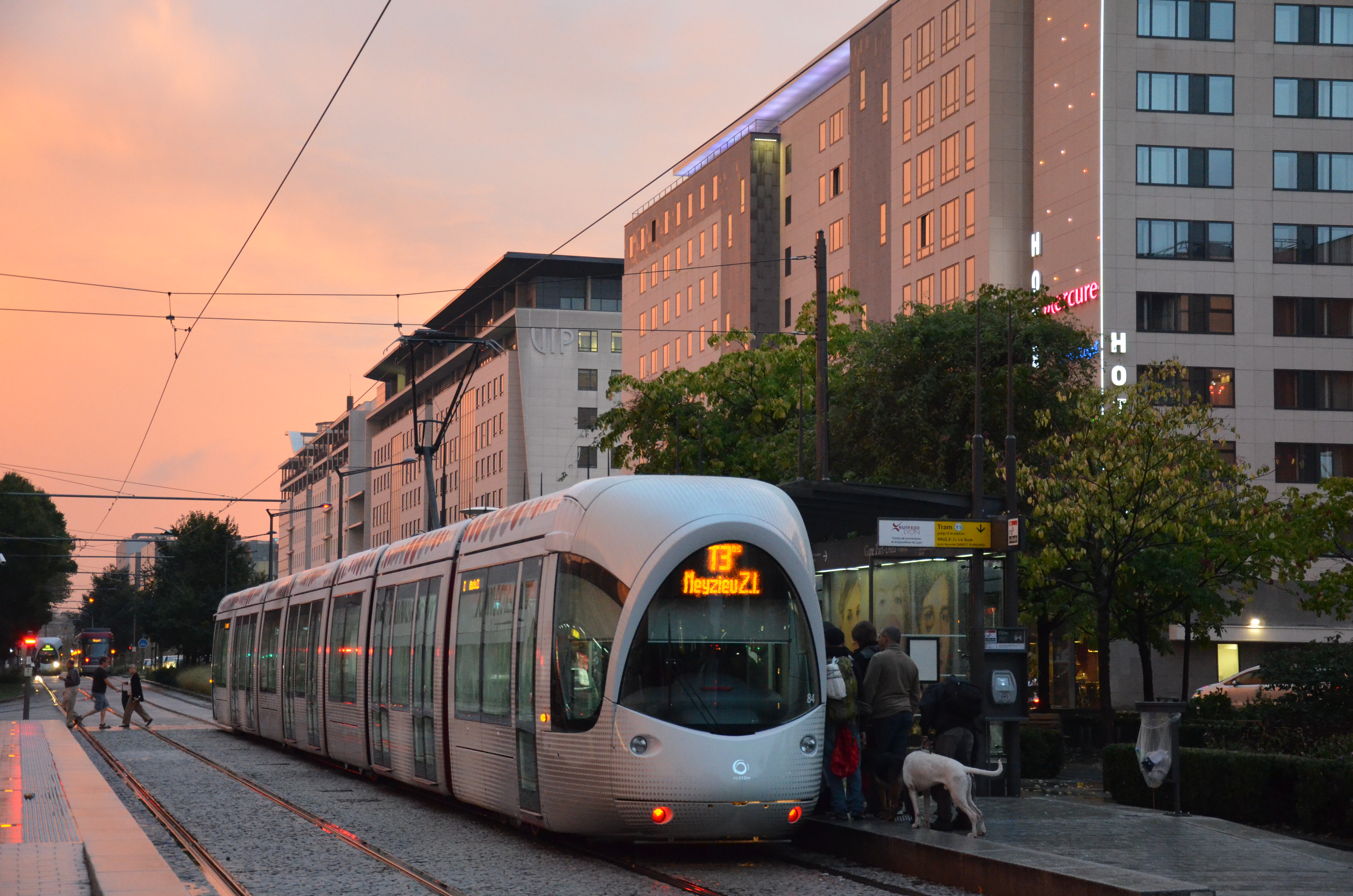
Line T3 at Gare Part-Dieu–Villette station

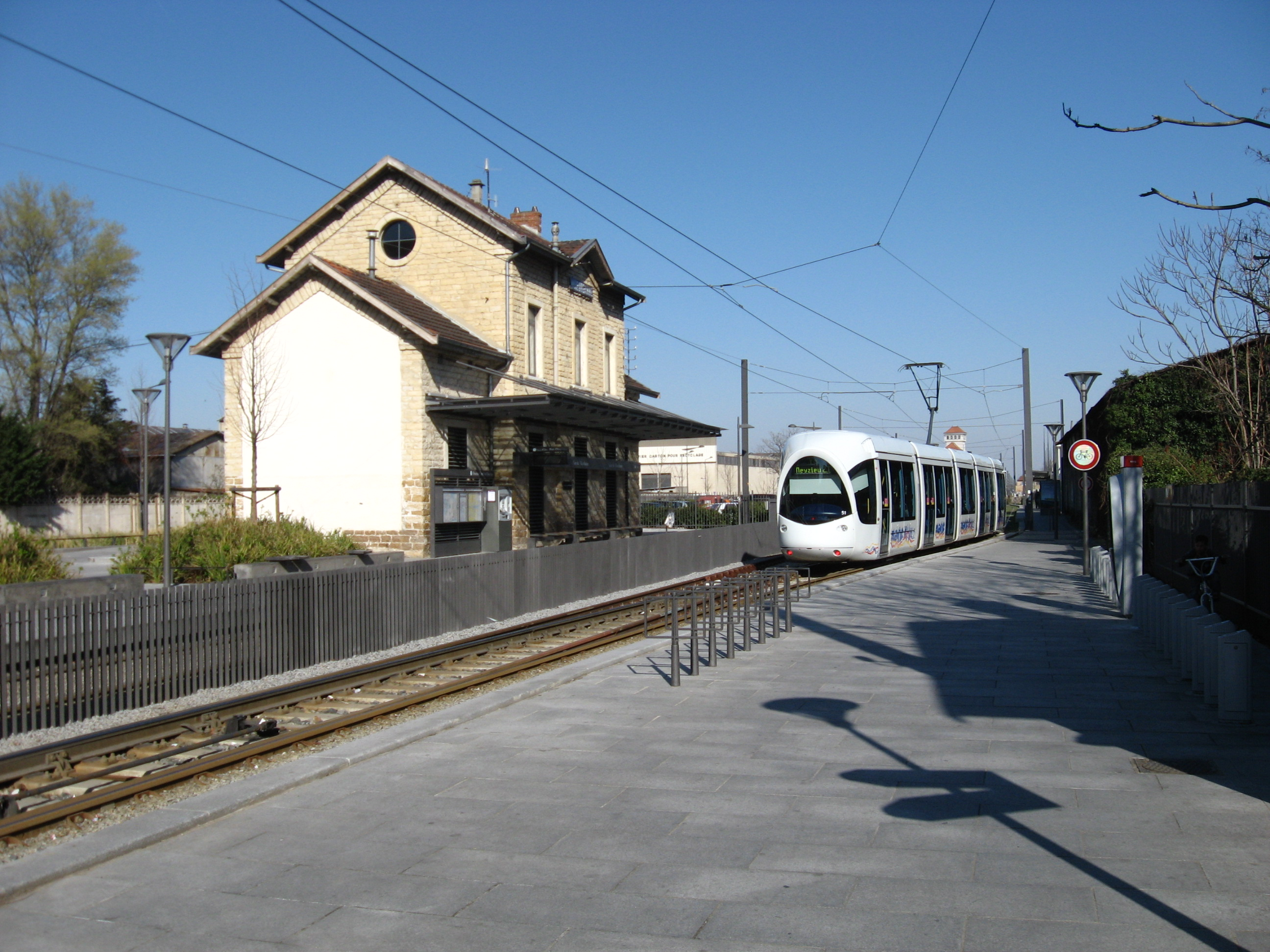
Line T3 at Gare de Villeurbanne station

Operates from 04:32 to 00:06, maintained by the Centre de Maintenance de Meyzieu.

Codenamed "LEA" (Ligne de l'Est de l'Agglomération), Line T3 runs along a portion of the former CFEL (Compagnie des chemins de fer de l'Est de Lyon) train line which extended from the Gare de l'Est de Lyon to Saint-Genix-d'Aoste (via Crémieu, Jallieu et Montalieu).

- Gare Part-Dieu–Villette (connections at Gare Part-Dieu–Vivier Merle with walking distance:)
- Dauphiné–Lacassagne
- Reconnaissance–Balzac
- Gare de Villeurbanne
- Bel Air–Les Brosses
- Vaulx-en-Velin–La Soie
- Décines–Roosevelt
- Décines–Centre
- Décines–Grand Large
- Meyzieu–Gare
- Meyzieu–Lycée Colonel Beltrame
- Meyzieu–ZI (service ends here on weekends)
- Meyzieu–Les Panettes (only from Monday to Friday)

Line T3, which is 14.6 km long, runs largely on ballasted railroad track. It takes 23 minutes to go from Gare Part-Dieu - Villette to Meyzieu - ZI, and runs at a maximum speed of 70 km/h (60 km/h at intersections, of which 26 are equipped with crossing gates). 7 km run near residential areas and are equipped with a noise barrier.

=== Line T4 ===
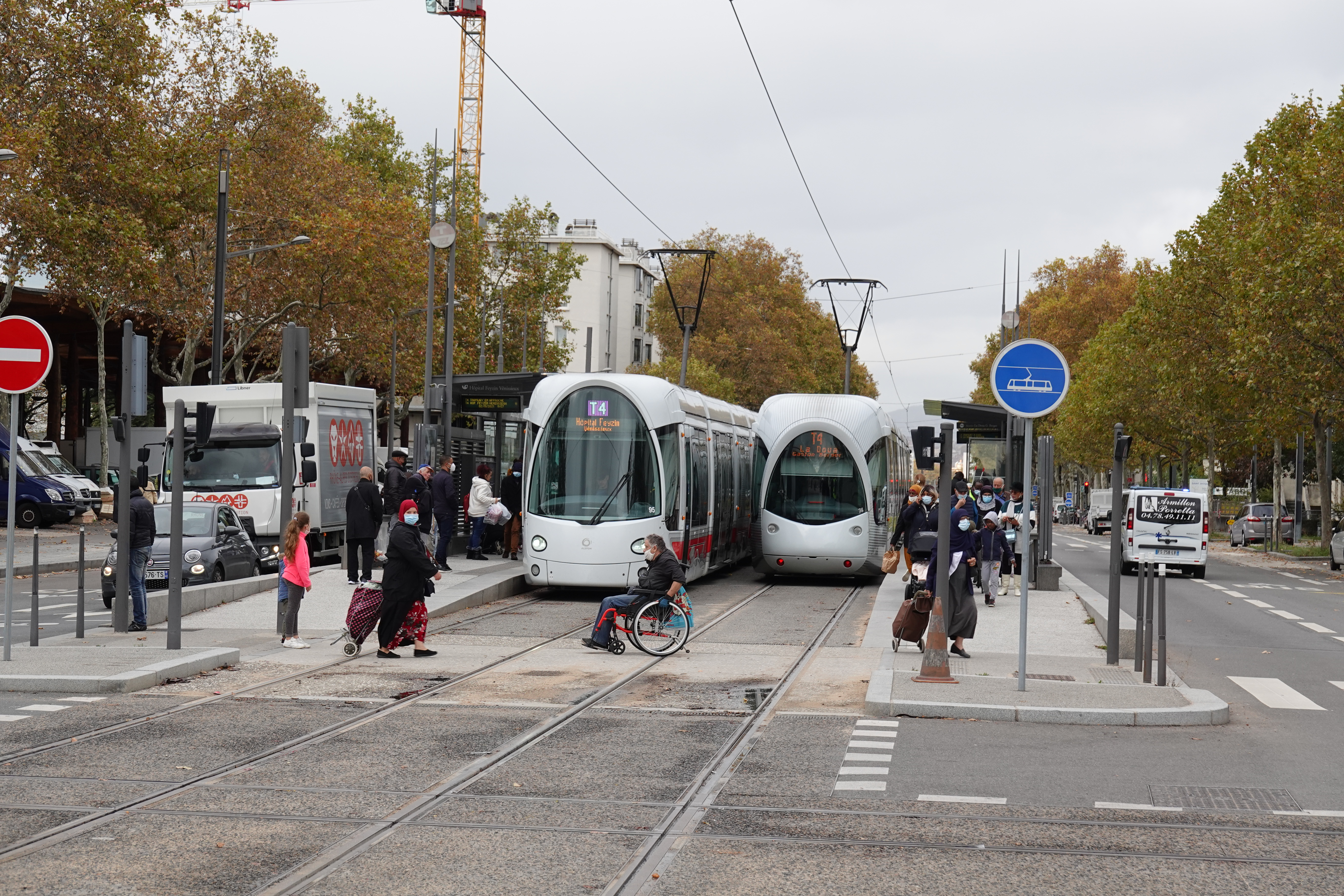
Line T4 at Beauvisage–CISL station

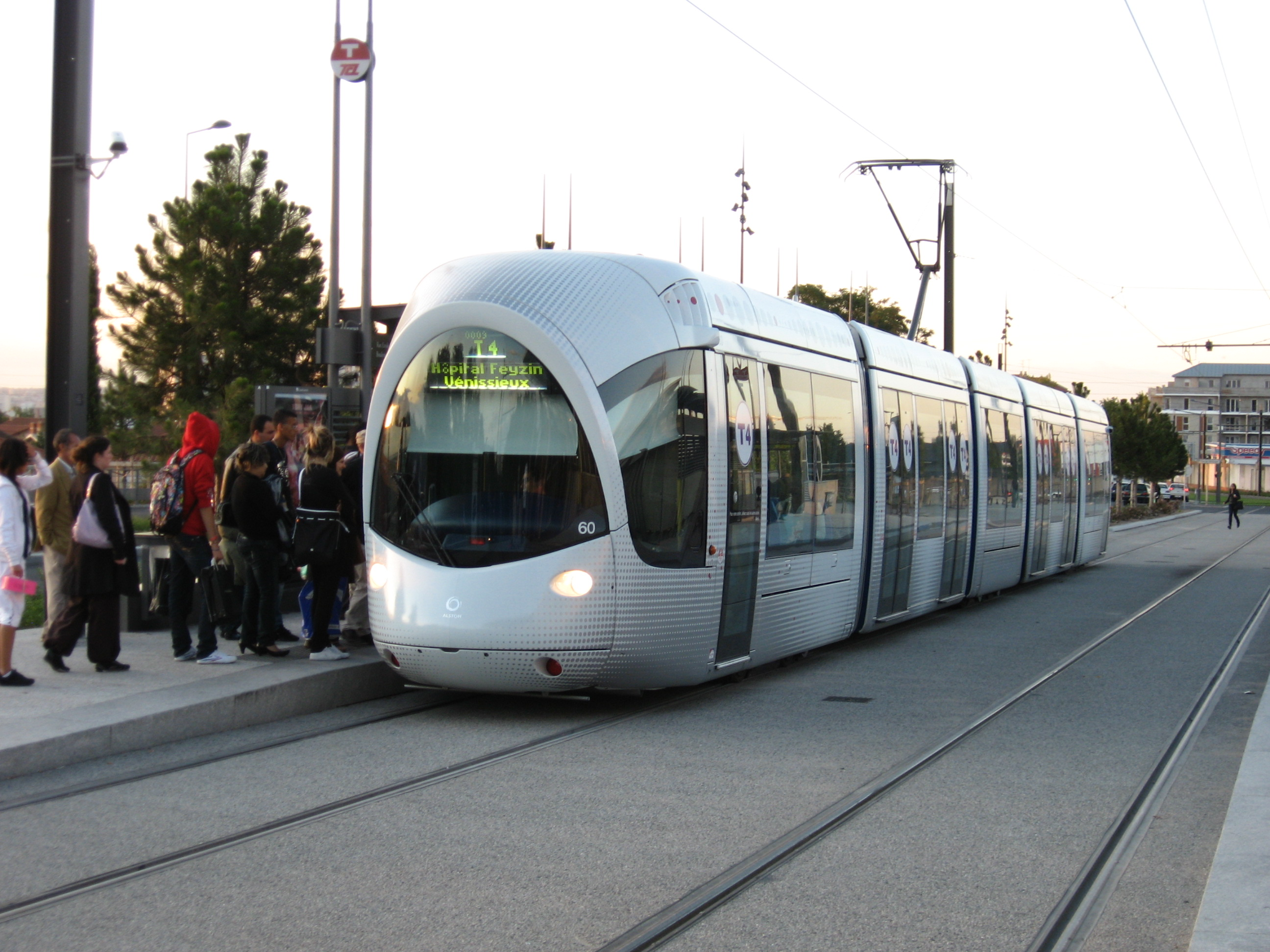
Line T4 at Gare de Vénissieux station

Operates from 04:39 to 00:45, maintained by the Centre de Maintenance de Saint-Priest - Porte des Alpes.

- IUT–Feyssine (only from Monday to Friday)
- Croix-Luizet (only from Monday to Friday)
- INSA–Einstein (only from Monday to Friday)
- La Doua–Gaston Berger (service starts here on weekends)
- Université Lyon 1
- Condorcet
- Le Tonkin
- Charpennes–Charles Hernu
- Collège Bellecombe
- Thiers–Lafayette
- Gare Part-Dieu–Villette (connections at Gare Part-Dieu–Vivier Merle with walking distance:)
- Archives–Parc Mandela
- Manufacture–Montluc
- Lycée Colbert
- Jet d'Eau–Mendès France
- Lycée Lumière (nearby at Villon:)
- États-Unis–Musée Tony Garnier
- Beauvisage–CISL
- États-Unis–Viviani
- Joliot-Curie–Marcel Sembat
- La Borelle
- Gare de Vénissieux
- Croizat–Paul Bert
- Marcel Houël–Hôtel de Ville
- Lycée Jacques Brel
- Herriot–Cagne
- Vénissy–Frida Kahlo
- Division Leclerc
- Maurice Thorez
- Lénine–Corsière
- Darnaise
- Hôpital Feyzin Vénissieux

=== Line T5 ===
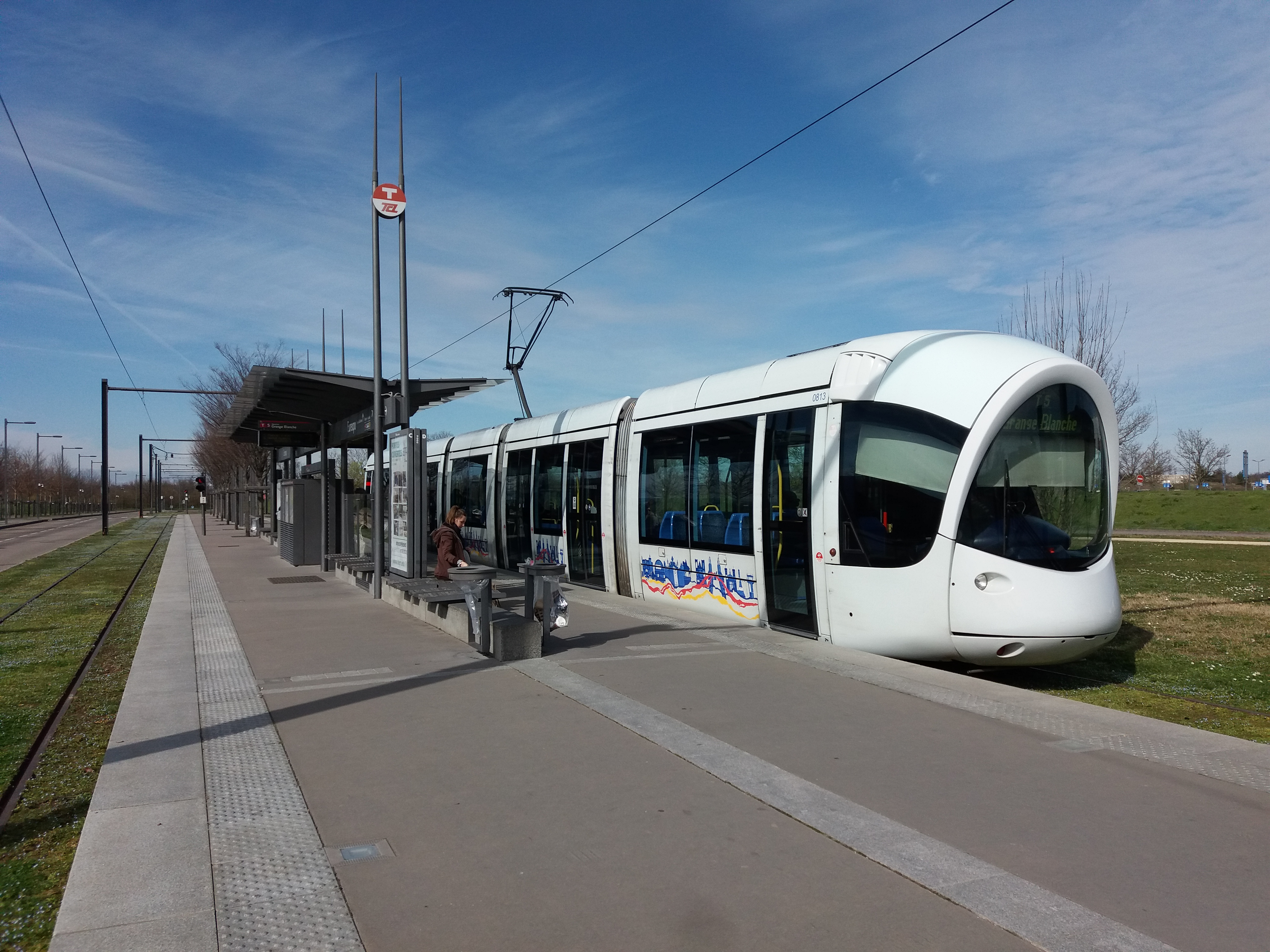
Line T5 at Eurexpo station

Operates from 05:00 to 00:00, maintained by the Centre de Maintenance de Saint-Priest - Porte des Alpes.

- Grange Blanche
- Ambroise Paré
- Desgenettes
- Essarts–Iris
- Boutasse–Camille Rousset
- Hôtel de Ville–Bron
- Les Alizés
- De Tassigny–Curial
- Lycée Jean-Paul Sartre
- Parc du Chêne (service ends here in July and August)
- Chassieu—ZAC du Chêne (opened 27 June 2025)
- Eurexpo (except in July and August)

From its opening to 4 October 2020, line T5 served the stop Eurexpo only on exhibition days and only from 08:00 to 22:00 (sometimes to 00:00). Since 5 October 2020, line T5 serves Eurexpo everyday, except in July and August.

A projected extension to Chassieu, which would have added two new stations, Eurexpo 2 and René Cassin, was not approved by the public enquiry and has been postponed (possibly indefinitely) due to lack of support from local councillors.

=== Line T6 ===
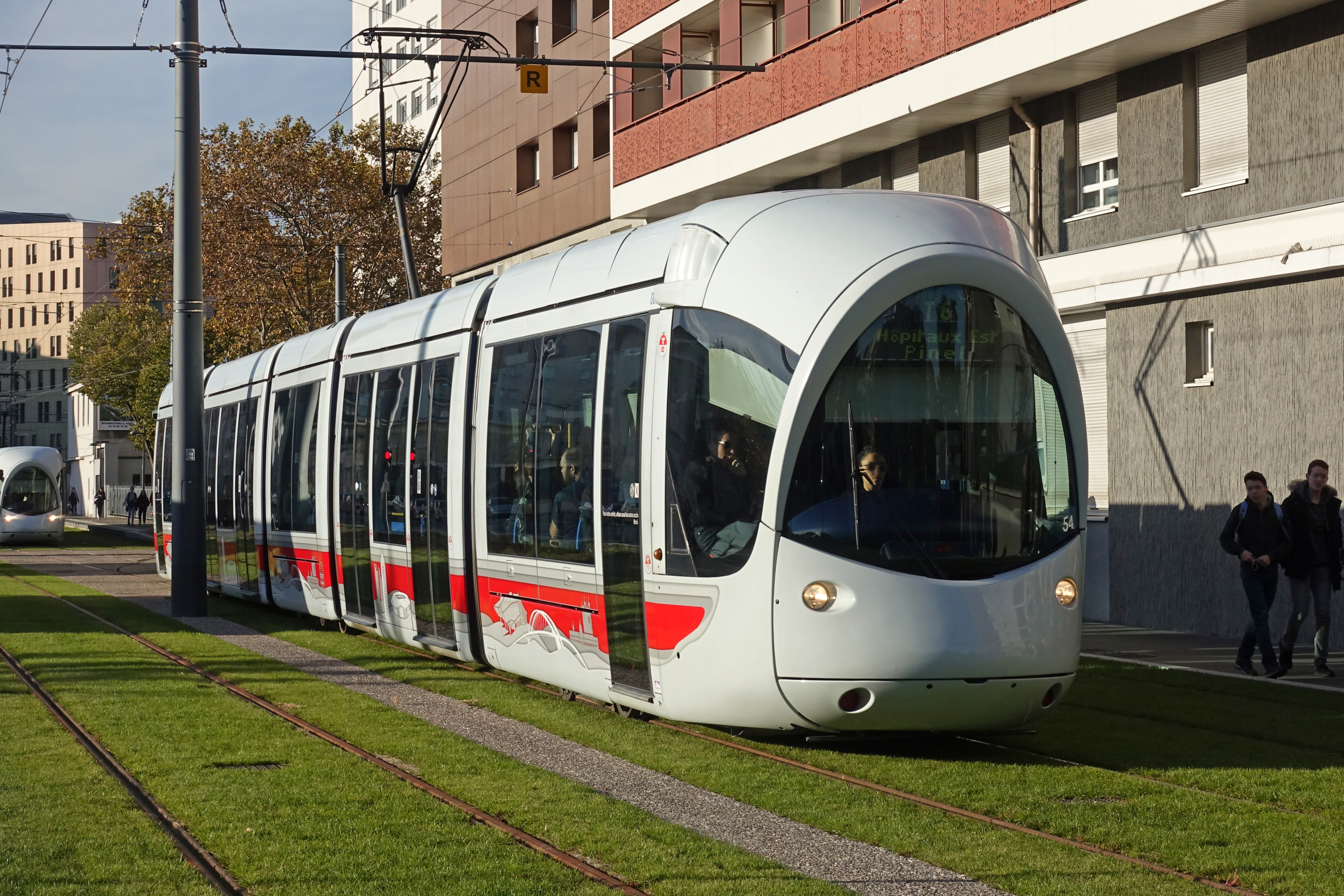
Line T6 near Debourg station

Operates from 05:00 to 00:56, maintained by the Centre de Maintenance de Saint-Priest - Porte des Alpes.

- Debourg
- Challemel-Lacour–Artillerie
- Moulin à Vent
- Petite Guille
- Beauvisage–Pressensé
- Beauvisage–CISL
- Grange Rouge–Santy
- Mermoz–Californie
- Mermoz–Moselle
- Mermoz–Pinel
- Essarts–Laënnec
- Desgenettes
- Vinatier
- Hôpitaux Est–Pinel
- Kimmerling–Genêts
- Gare de Villeurbanne
- Grandclément
- Saint-Exupéry–Jaurès
- Verlaine–Tolstoï
- Hôtel de Ville–TNP
- Gratte-Ciel
- Geneviève de Gaulle
- Roger Planchon
- La Doua–Gaston Berger

Line T6 has been built as an extension of line T1 from its terminus at Debourg to Lyon's eastern hospital complex.

A subsequent 5.4 kilometres (3.4 mi) extension with 10 new stations from Hôpitaux Est–Pinel to La Doua–Gaston Berger, university campus in Villeurbanne, started construction in the beginning of 2023 and opened on 14 February 2026. This extension connects with lines T1, T3, T4 and future line T9.

=== Line T7 ===
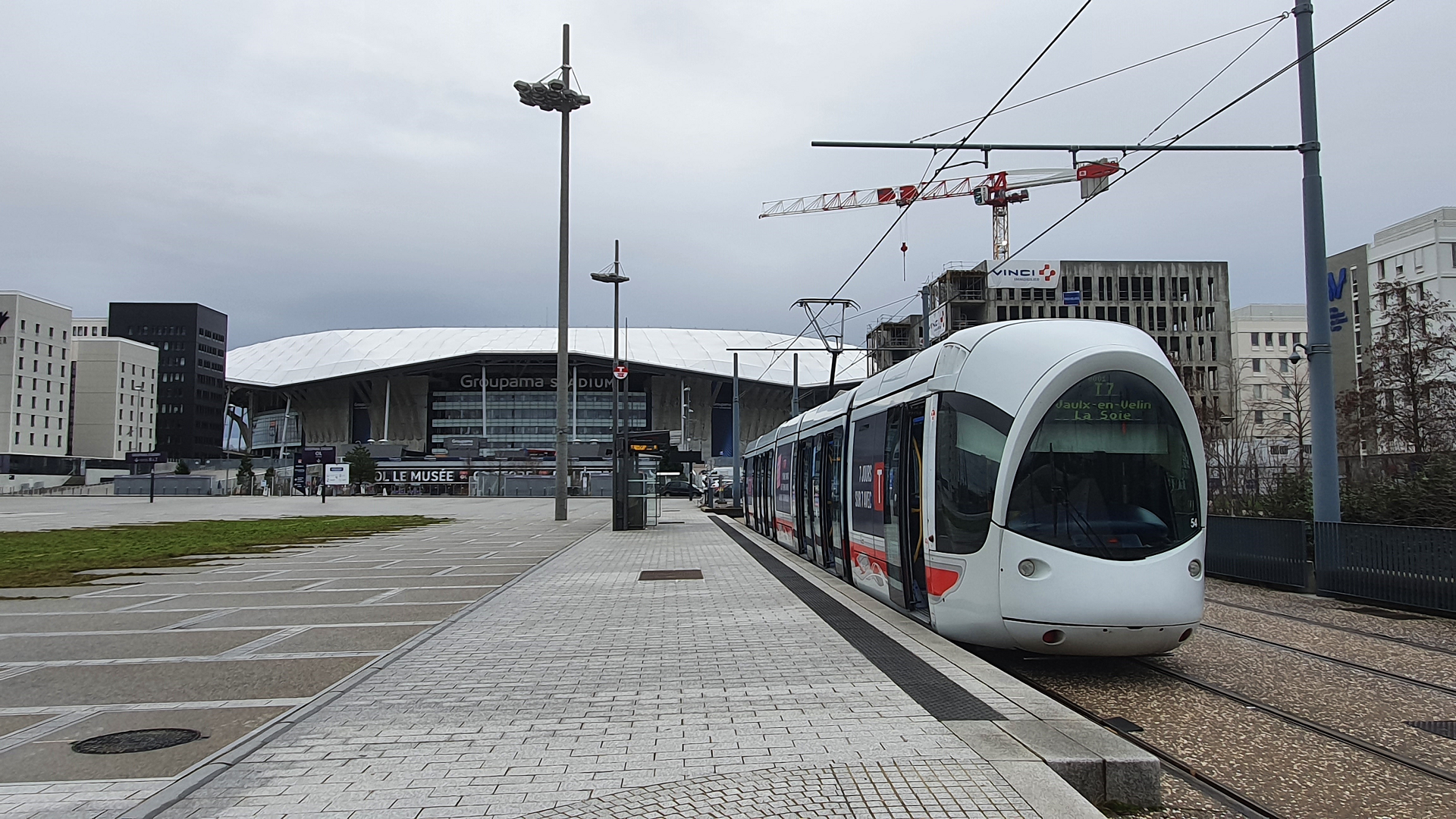
Line T7 at Décines–OL Vallée station, in front of the Parc Olympique Lyonnais

Operates from 06:00 to 23:55 (from 08:00 on Saturday and from 09:00 on Sunday), maintained by the Centre de Maintenance de Meyzieu.

- Vaulx-en-Velin–La Soie
- Décines–Roosevelt
- Décines–Centre
- Décines–Grand Large
- Décines–OL Vallée

Since its opening, the Parc Olympique Lyonnais is connected to the Lyon tram network with a specially built railway track, but this track was only used by special tram shuttles running on game or event days in the stadium. Line T7 has been launched as a daily tram service to serve the Parc Olympique Lyonnais and its developing neighborhood named OL Vallée.

This line didn't require the construction of any new railway, it only uses an infrastructure that already existed before, including a part of line T3 and the railway track that links line T3 to the Parc Olympique Lyonnais.

=== Line T9 ===
Line T9 is under construction and is expected to open in 2026 through Vaulx-en-Velin and Villeurbanne.

- Vaulx-en-Velin–La Soie (expected opening in 2026)
- Brunel–Cavellini (expected opening in 2026)
- Catupolan (expected opening in 2026)
- La Balme (expected opening in 2026)
- Stade Francisque Jomard (expected opening in 2026)
- Carmellino (expected opening in 2026)
- Vaulx Hôtel de Ville–Campus (expected opening in 2026)
- Lesire (expected opening in 2026)
- Mas du Taureau (expected opening in 2026)
- Saint-Jean–Centre (expected opening in 2026)
- Puces du Canal (expected opening in 2026)
- Buers–Salengro (expected opening in 2026)
- Croix-Luizet (expected opening in 2026)
- INSA–Einstein (expected opening in 2026)
- La Doua–Gaston Berger (expected opening in 2026)
- Université Lyon 1 (expected opening in 2026)
- Condorcet (expected opening in 2026)
- Le Tonkin (expected opening in 2026)
- Charpennes–Charles Hernu (expected opening in 2026)

=== Line T10 ===
Line T10 is under construction and is expected to open in 2026 through Lyon 7th arrondissement, Saint-Fons and Vénissieux.

- Gare de Vénissieux (expected opening in 2026)
- Vénissieux–Émile Zola (expected opening in 2026)
- Vénissieux–Jean Jaurès (expected opening in 2026)
- Vénissieux–Marronniers (expected opening in 2026)
- Madeleine Barot (expected opening in 2026)
- Théâtre Jean Marais (expected opening in 2026)
- Saint-Fons–4 Chemins (expected opening in 2026)
- Saint-Fons–Technologie (expected opening in 2026)
- Techsud (expected opening in 2026)
- Parc de l'Artillerie (expected opening in 2026)
- Port Édouard Herriot (expected opening in 2026)
- Stade de Gerland–Le LOU (expected opening in 2026)
- Parc de Gerland–CSI (expected opening in 2026)
- Halle Tony Garnier (expected opening in 2026)

=== Rhônexpress ===
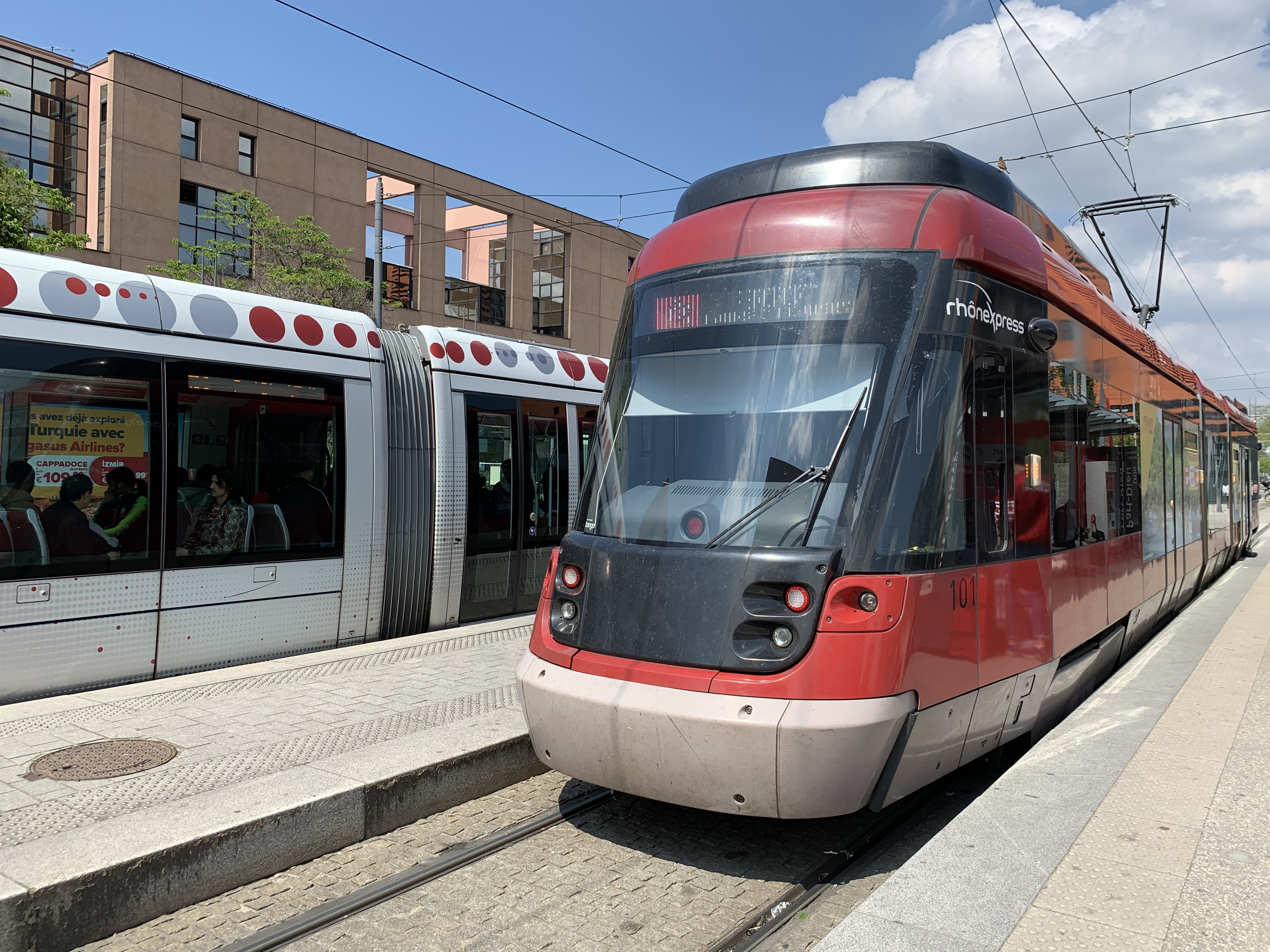
A Rhônexpress tram-train at Gare Part-Dieu–Villette station

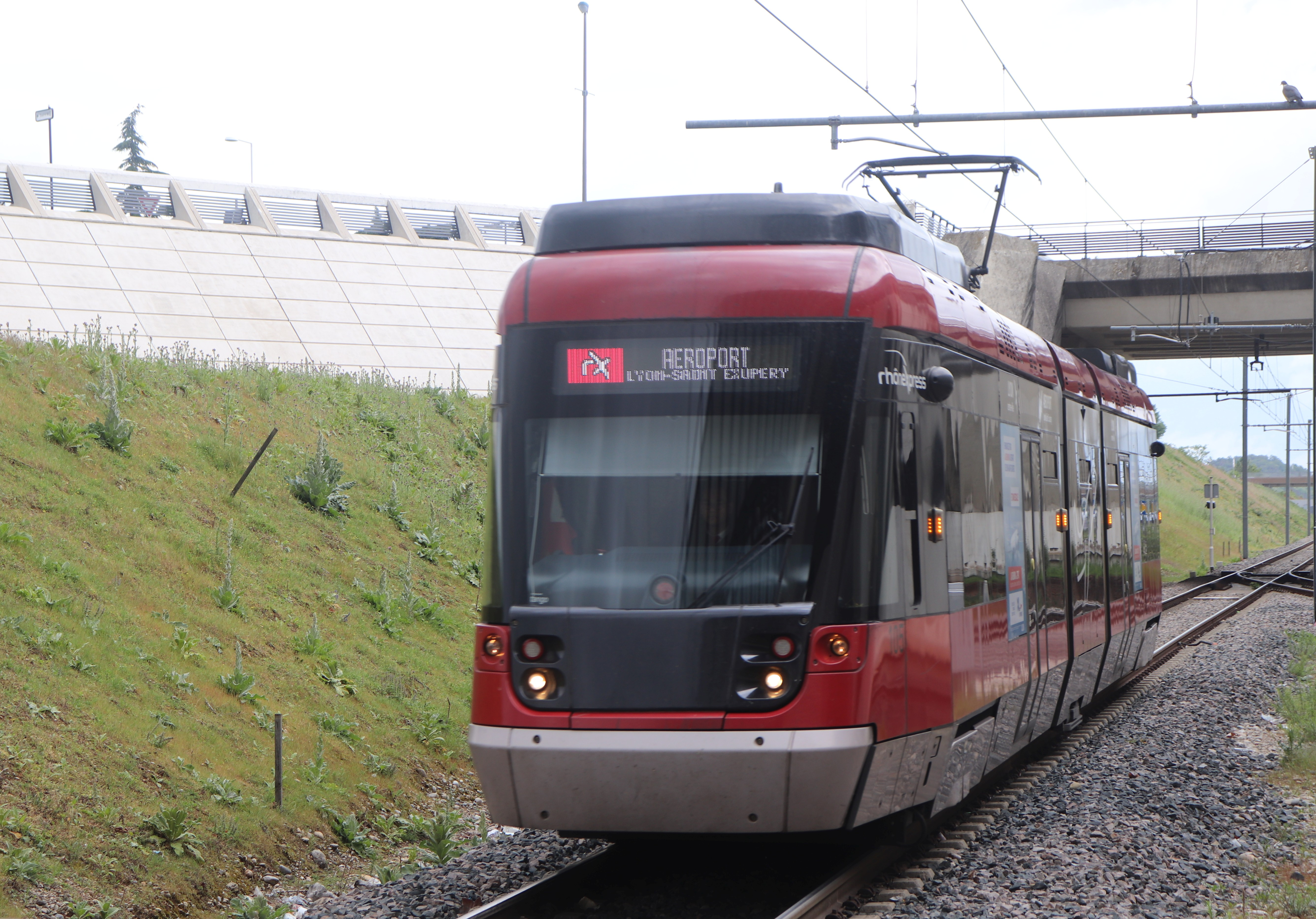
A Rhônexpress tram-train approaching the railway station of Lyon–Saint-Exupéry Airport

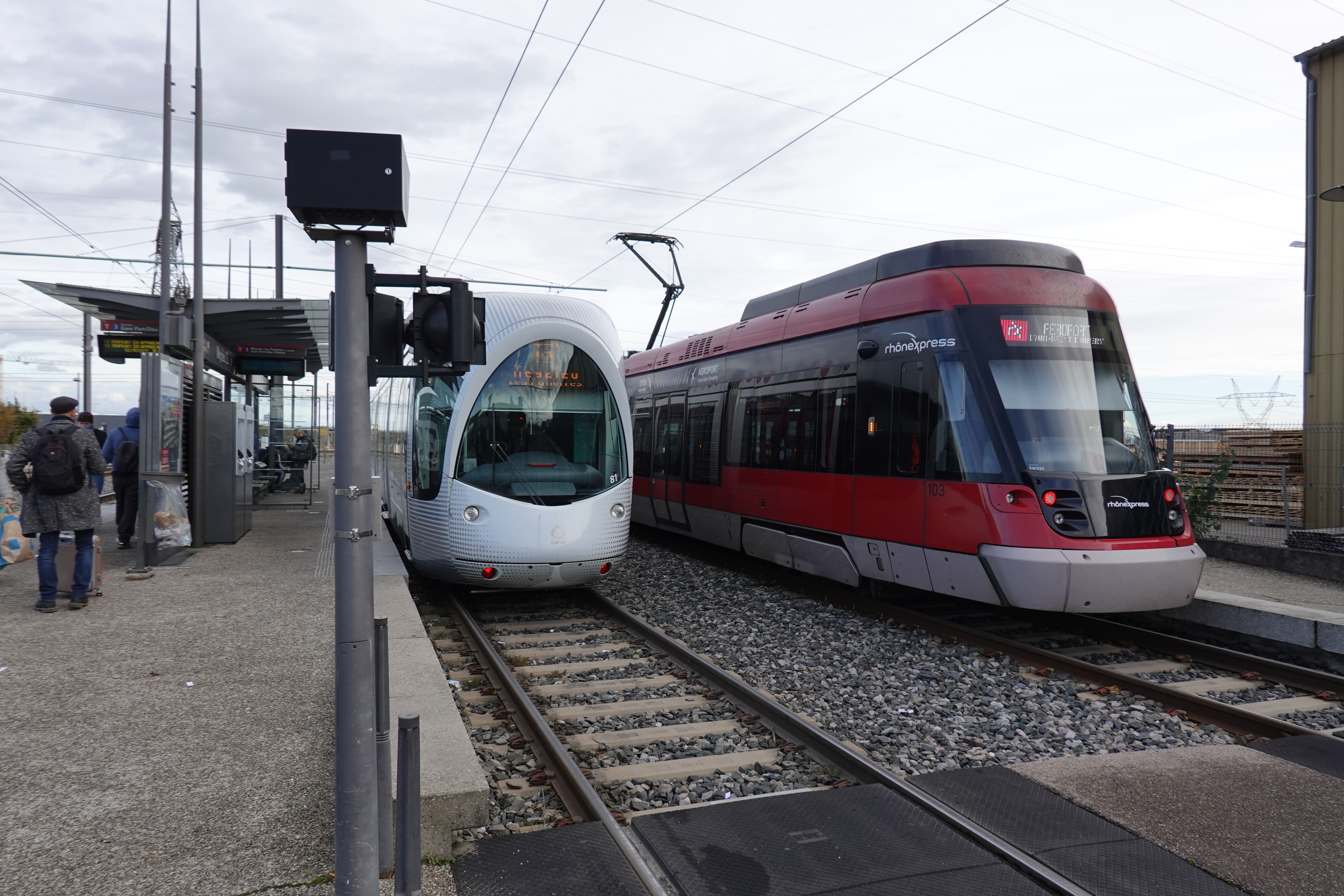
A Rhônexpress tram-train at Meyzieu–ZI station

Rhônexpress is an express line which links La Part-Dieu (main railway station and business district) to Lyon–Saint-Exupéry international airport and TGV railway station, with two intermediate stops and a total of four stations.

- Gare Part-Dieu–Villette (connections at Gare Part-Dieu–Vivier Merle with walking distance:)
- Vaulx-en-Velin–La Soie
- Meyzieu–ZI
- Aéroport Lyon–Saint-Exupéry

The route is served by 6 tram-trains, constructed by Swiss builder Stadler Rail. Its route consists of the existing T3 tram line, which is built with passing tracks to allow express service, and an 8.5 kilometres (5.3 mi) new track extension from Meyzieu–ZI to the airport. Total length of track is 22 kilometres (14 mi) needing approximately 30 minutes to go from Part-Dieu to the airport. Service runs from morning until last flight arrival, with departures every 15 minutes at peak times.

Work began on 9 October 2008 and was completed 9 August 2010. The Conseil général of the Rhône department franchised the operation rights for 30 years to Rhônexpress, a consortium including Vinci SA (28.2%), Veolia Transport (28.2%), Vossloh Infrastructure Service (4.2%), Cegelec Centre Est (2,8%) and the Caisse des dépôts et consignations. Unlike the Lyon tramways, the Rhônexpress is not run by TCL. Stadler's Tangos are used as rolling stock.

== Rolling stock ==
The TCL fleet is composed of 107 articulated Alstom Citadis X02 vehicles. 73 Citadis 302s, numbered N°801 - 873, were built between 2000 and 2009, and serve on lines T1, T2, T5, T6 and T7. 34 Citadis 402s, numbered N°874 - 906, were built between 2012 and 2020, and serve on lines T3 and T4. In August 2021, it was announced that Alstom will supply 35 additional Citadis trams to Lyon. These will be identical to the fifteen 43-metre trams delivered in 2020 and 2021, which feature a redesigned nose for better visibility and driving comfort.

Six Stadler Tango vehicles are used for the Rhônexpress service.

== Development projects ==
After the victory of a coalition led by the French green party at both the 2020 Lyon municipal election and the metropolitan election (both in the context of the 2020 French municipal elections), new plans for extensions of the tramway network are drafted. Four projects are proposed, including an extension of the newly finished line T6 to La Doua, via Gratte-Ciel, and three new lines:

- T8 : Bellecour - Part-Dieu - La Doua
- T9 : La Doua - Vaulx-en-Velin Hôtel de Ville - Carré de Soie
- T10 : Gerland - ZAC Technosud - Saint-Fons - Vénissieux railway station

After a period of consultations, the projects of extension of the T6 line and the new T9 and T10 lines are approved in their entirety in 2021, but not the T8, deemed of lesser usefulness since benefiting areas already well covered by the existing network. Construction started in 2023 on the future T9 and T10 lines as well as on the T6 extension, and is expected to be completed in 2026 for the three of them.

In a project named Western Lyon Express Tram (Tramway Express de l'Ouest Lyonnais - TEOL), line T2 is projected to be extended with five new stations from Hôtel de Région–Montrochet to Alaï in western Lyon, including an underground section with two underground stations.

In October 2024, a project is revealed for a new line in the eastern suburbs of Lyon, expected to open by 2030 between Vaulx-en-Velin–La Soie and Gare de Vénissieux via Bron. The new line will take over the T8 number and will feature 12 stations.

== See also ==
- Trams in France
- List of town tramway systems in France
