= Jonathan Leria =

French basketball player (born 1990)

Jonathan Leria (born 4 June 1990 in Décines-Charpieu) is a French basketball player who played for the French Pro A clubs Pau-Lacq-Orthez and Paris-Levallois during the 2008-2011 seasons.
