= Hôtel de Ville, Meyzieu =

Town hall in Meyzieu, France

Hôtel de Ville
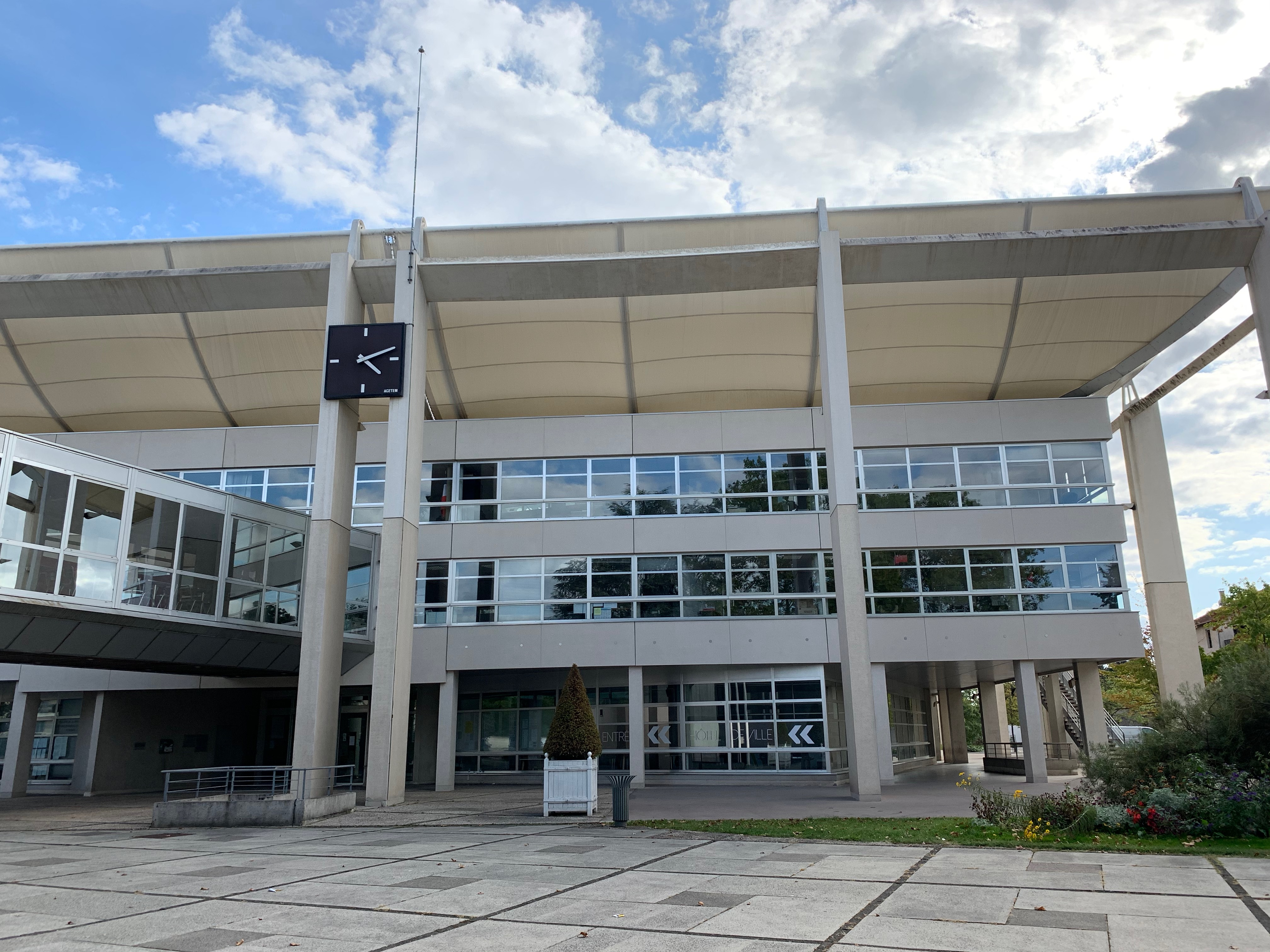
- The main frontage of the Hôtel de Ville in September 2019
- Interactive map of the Hôtel de Ville area

General information
- Type: City hall
- Architectural style: Modern style
- Location: Meyzieu, France
- Coordinates: 45.7654°N 5.0052°E
- Completed: 1994

The Hôtel de Ville (French pronunciation: [otɛl də vil], City Hall) is a municipal building in Meyzieu, Metropolis of Lyon, in eastern France, standing on Place de l'Europe.

== History ==
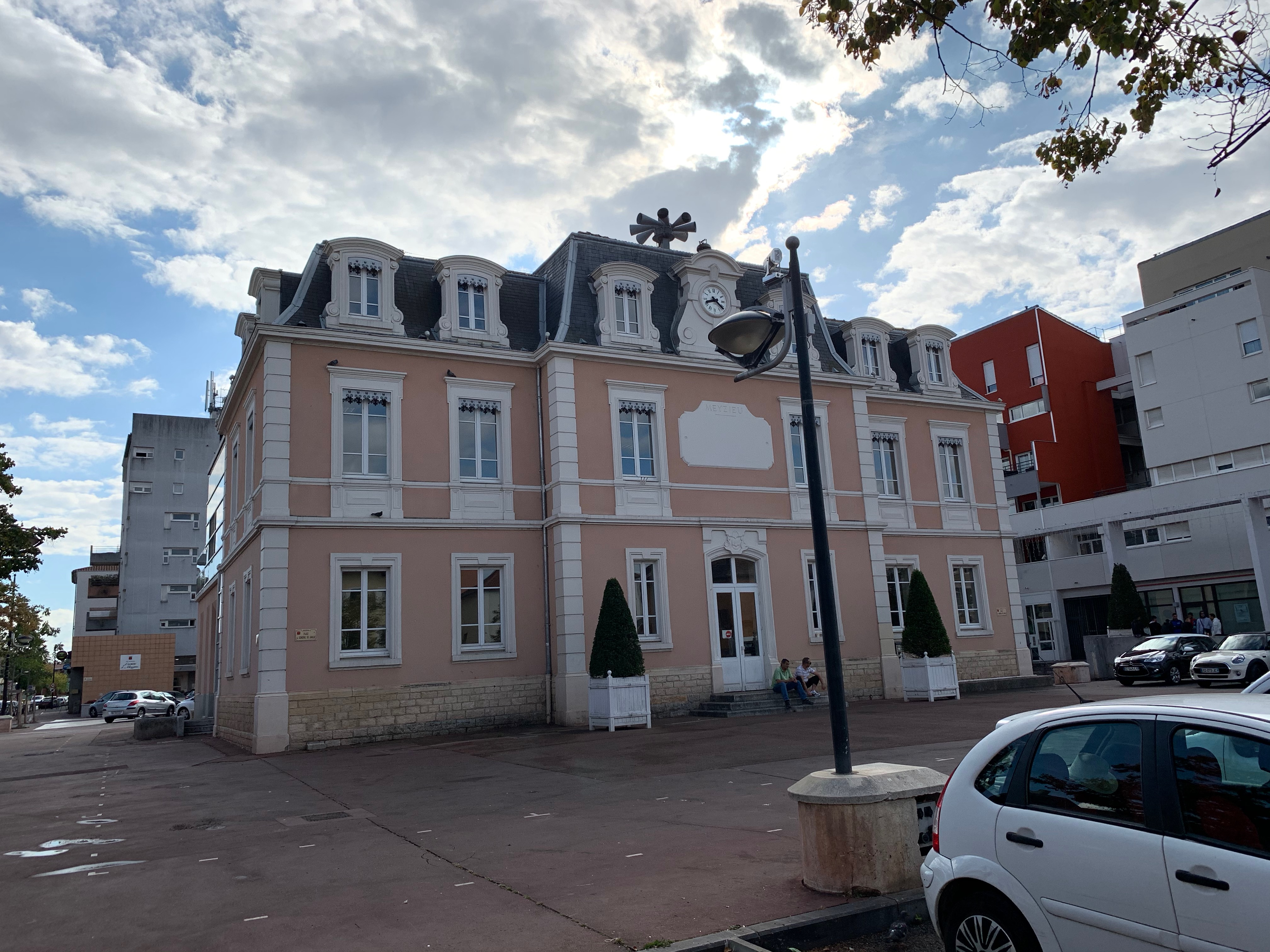
The old town hall on Place Jean-Monnet

Following the French Revolution, the town council led by the mayor, Vincent Quinon, decided to rent an office in a building on the corner of Rue Louis-Saulnier and Rue de la République. Meetings were held in the clergy house close to the Church of Saint-Sébastien. This arrangement continued until 1849, when the council moved to a building known as "Mas des Maisons Rouges" where they established a combined school and town hall. However, by the early 1880s, the building had become dilapidated, and the council decided to demolish the old building and to erect a new combined school and town hall on what is now Place Jean-Monnet. The new building was designed by Firmin Allemand in the neoclassical style, built in brick with a stucco finish and was completed in 1877.

The design involved a symmetrical main frontage of seven bays facing onto the square. The central section of three bays, which was slightly projected forward, featured a segmental headed doorway flanked by a pair of narrow casement windows on the ground floor, and a panel flanked by two more casement windows on the first floor. At roof level, there was a clock supported by scrolls and surmounted by a curved pediment. The outer bays were fenestrated by casement windows on the first two floors and by dormer windows at attic level. The panel was originally inscribed with the words "Mairie, Justice de Paix, Groupe Scolaire".

The building initially operated as a coeducational school but closed to girls in 1913, when the girls moved to the former Merlin family home on Rue Louis-Saulnier, and closed to boys in 1958, when they also moved to other schools. After the building was no longer required for municipal purposes, it became the Maison des Associations (community centre) in 2006, and was renamed Maison des Associations Simone-André, to commemorate the work of the former local politician, Simone André, on 17 September 2011.

Following the liberation of the town by American troops on 2 September 1944, during the Second World War, the troops formed up in their vehicles on Rue Louis-Saulnier, adjacent to the town hall, in preparation for their next offensive.

In the late 1980s, following a significant population increase, the council led by the mayor, Jean Poperen, decided to commission a modern building. The site they selected was some 300 meters (980 ft) to the east along Rue de la République. The new building was designed in the modern style, built in concrete and glass and was officially opened by the president of France, François Mitterrand, on 12 February 1994. The design involved a three-storey square-shaped main block, with a large canvas canopy projecting over the sides of the building, and an oval-shaped structure containing the Salle du Conseil (council chamber) to the northeast of the main block.
