= Saint-Priest station =

Railway station in Saint-Priest, France

Coordinates: 45°41′12″N 4°56′2″E

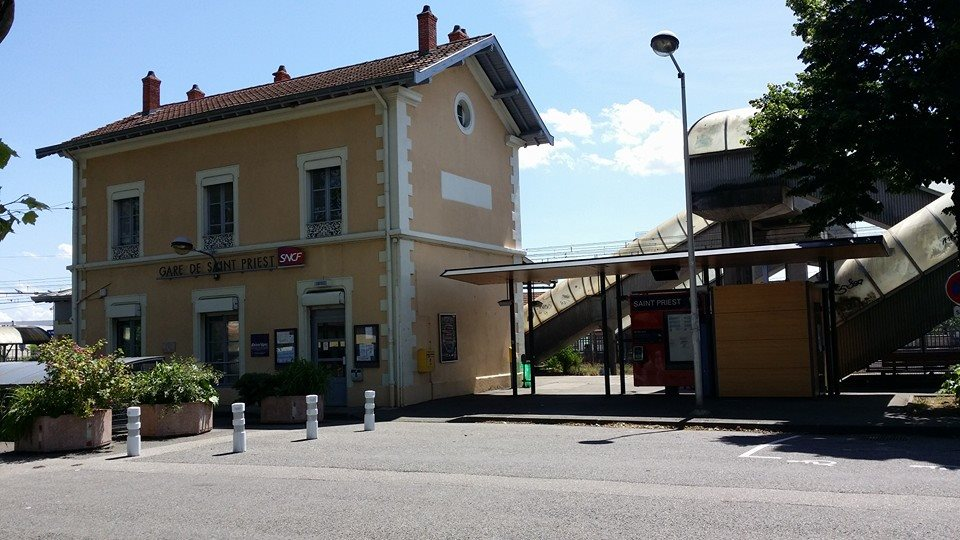
Saint-Priest station

Saint-Priest station (French: Gare de Saint-Priest) is a railway station serving the town Saint-Priest, a suburb of Lyon in the Lyon Metropolis, east-south France.

== Services ==
The following train services serve the station as of 2022:

Preceding station	TER Auvergne-Rhône-Alpes	Following station
Vénissieux towards Lyon-Perrache	1	Saint-Quentin-Fallavier towards Saint-André-le-Gaz

== See also ==
- List of SNCF stations in Auvergne-Rhône-Alpes
