= Meyzieu =

Meyzieu Mêsiô (Arpitan)
- Commune
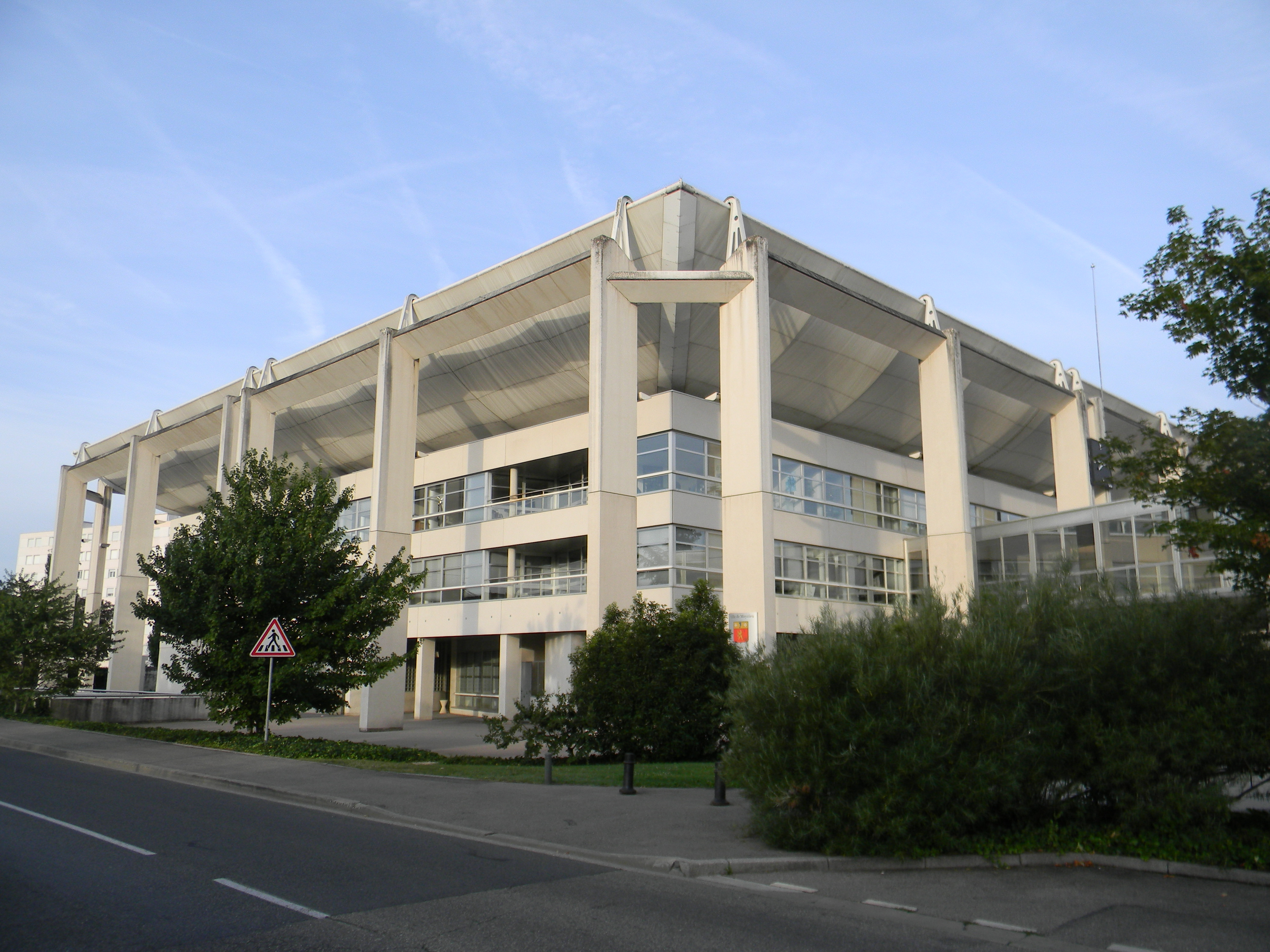
- The Hôtel de Ville

- Coat of arms
- Location of Meyzieu
- Location within France Location within Auvergne-Rhône-Alpes
- Coordinates: 45°46′00″N 5°00′13″E
- Country: France
- Region: Auvergne-Rhône-Alpes
- Metropolis: Lyon Metropolis
- Arrondissement: Lyon

Government
  - Mayor (2020–2026): Christophe Quiniou
- Area^{1}: 23.01 km^{2} (8.88 sq mi)
- Elevation: 192 m (630 ft)
- Highest elevation: 250 m (820 ft)
- Lowest elevation: 167 m (548 ft)
- Population (2023): 36,687
  - Density: 1,594/km^{2} (4,129/sq mi)
- Time zone: UTC+01:00 (CET)
  - Summer (DST): UTC+02:00 (CEST)
- INSEE/Postal code: 69282 /69330
- ^{1} French Land Register data, which excludes lakes, ponds, glaciers > 1 km^{2} (0.386 sq mi or 247 acres) and river estuaries.

Meyzieu (French pronunciation: [mɛzjø]; Arpitan: Mêsiô [ma.ˈʒy]) is a commune in the Metropolis of Lyon in Auvergne-Rhône-Alpes region in eastern France. It is a large suburb of Lyon, situated 13 km east of the city centre on the left bank of the Rhône. Before 1967, it was part of the Isère department.

== History ==
The Hôtel de Ville was completed in 1994.

== Population ==
Historical population

Year	Pop.	±% p.a.
1793	910	—
1800	1,045	+2.00%
1806	1,006	−0.63%
1821	1,121	+0.72%
1831	1,155	+0.30%
1836	1,301	+2.41%
1841	1,353	+0.79%
1846	1,460	+1.53%
1851	1,433	−0.37%
1856	1,456	+0.32%
1861	1,525	+0.93%
1866	1,504	−0.28%
1872	1,580	+0.82%
1876	1,566	−0.22%
1881	1,436	−1.72%
1886	1,540	+1.41%
1891	1,519	−0.27%
1896	1,995	+5.60%
1901	1,597	−4.35%

Year	Pop.	±% p.a.
1906	1,482	−1.48%
1911	1,523	+0.55%
1921	1,641	+0.75%
1926	1,807	+1.95%
1931	2,215	+4.16%
1936	2,209	−0.05%
1946	2,021	−0.89%
1954	2,333	+1.81%
1962	4,483	+8.51%
1968	10,012	+14.33%
1975	19,435	+9.94%
1982	26,776	+4.68%
1990	28,077	+0.59%
1999	28,009	−0.03%
2007	29,014	+0.44%
2012	31,493	+1.65%
2017	33,477	+1.23%
2023	36,687	+1.54%

Source: EHESS and INSEE (1968-2023)

== Transport ==
- Rhônexpress
- Tram T3

== See also ==
- Communes of the Metropolis of Lyon
