= Saint-Priest, Metropolis of Lyon =

Saint-Priest
- Commune
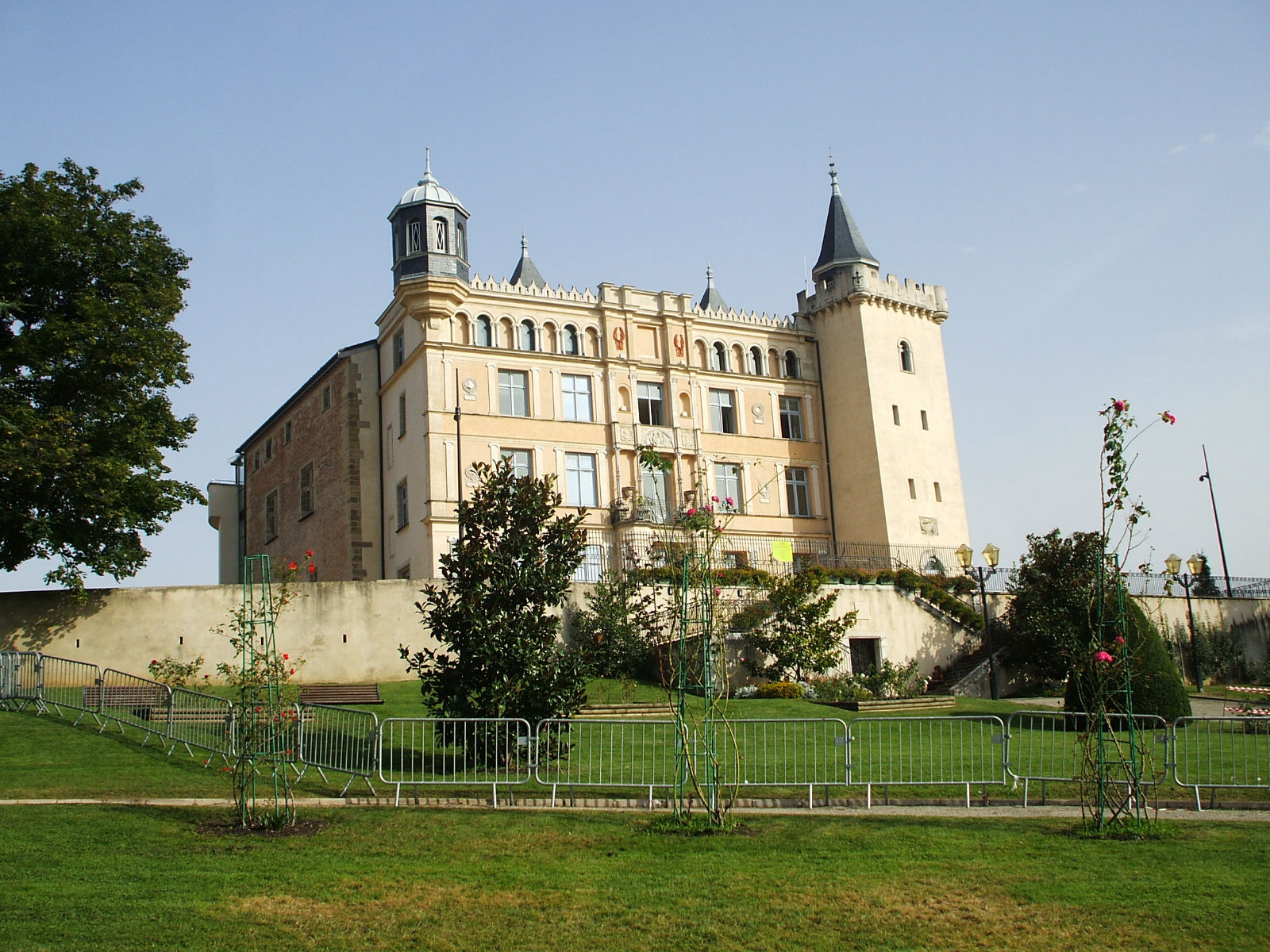
- Château of Saint-Priest

- Coat of arms
- Location of Saint-Priest
- Location within France Location within Auvergne-Rhône-Alpes
- Coordinates: 45°41′50″N 4°56′41″E
- Country: France
- Region: Auvergne-Rhône-Alpes
- Metropolis: Lyon Metropolis
- Arrondissement: Lyon

Government
  - Mayor (2020–2026): Gilles Gascon (LR)
- Area^{1}: 29.71 km^{2} (11.47 sq mi)
- Elevation: 208 m (682 ft)
- Highest elevation: 263 m (863 ft)
- Lowest elevation: 189 m (620 ft)
- Population (2023): 49,229
  - Density: 1,657/km^{2} (4,292/sq mi)
- Time zone: UTC+01:00 (CET)
  - Summer (DST): UTC+02:00 (CEST)
- INSEE/Postal code: 69290 /69800
- ^{1} French Land Register data, which excludes lakes, ponds, glaciers > 1 km^{2} (0.386 sq mi or 247 acres) and river estuaries.

Saint-Priest (French pronunciation: [sɛ̃ pʁijɛst]; Arpitan: Sant-Priést) is a commune in the Metropolis of Lyon in the Auvergne-Rhône-Alpes region in eastern France. It is the fourth-largest suburb of the city of Lyon, and is located to its southeast side. The Saint-Priest station is served by local trains to Lyon and Saint-André-le-Gaz.

== Population ==
Historical population

Year	Pop.	±% p.a.
1793	1,100	—
1800	1,210	+1.37%
1806	1,253	+0.58%
1821	1,489	+1.16%
1831	1,718	+1.44%
1836	1,854	+1.54%
1841	1,981	+1.33%
1846	2,152	+1.67%
1851	2,209	+0.52%
1856	2,312	+0.92%
1861	2,428	+0.98%
1866	2,518	+0.73%
1872	2,475	−0.29%
1876	2,506	+0.31%
1881	2,410	−0.78%
1886	2,724	+2.48%
1891	2,387	−2.61%
1896	2,584	+1.60%
1901	2,577	−0.05%

Year	Pop.	±% p.a.
1906	2,608	+0.24%
1911	2,543	−0.50%
1921	2,704	+0.62%
1926	4,268	+9.56%
1931	5,957	+6.90%
1936	5,336	−2.18%
1946	5,673	+0.61%
1954	7,115	+2.87%
1962	10,681	+5.21%
1968	20,419	+11.40%
1975	36,734	+8.75%
1982	42,677	+2.17%
1990	41,876	−0.24%
1999	40,974	−0.24%
2007	40,917	−0.02%
2012	42,488	+0.76%
2017	46,207	+1.69%
2023	49,229	+1.06%

Source: EHESS and INSEE (1968–2023)

== Notable people ==
- Estelle Cascarino (1997–), professional football player for West Ham United and the France national team
- Ève Périsset (1994–), professional football player for Montreal Roses and the France national team
- Delphine Cascarino (1997–), professional football player for London City Lionesses and the France national team

== See also ==
- Communes of the Metropolis of Lyon
