= Battle of Luzzara =

1702 battle of the War of the Spanish Succession

- Part of War of the Spanish Succession
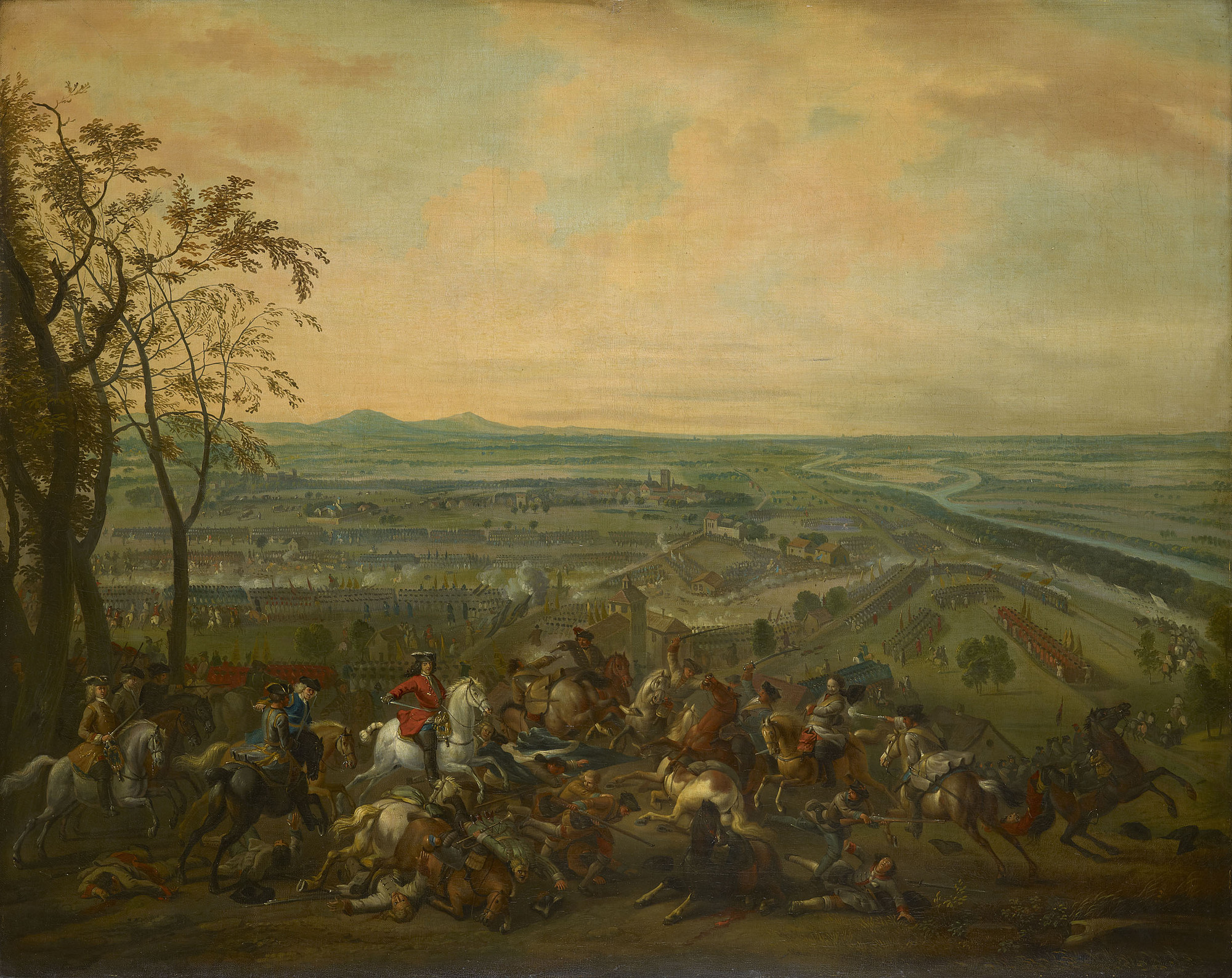
- Battle of Luzzara, by Jan van Huchtenburg
Date	15 August 1702
Location	Luzzara, Emilia-Romagna, Italy
Result	Inconclusive

Belligerents
Holy Roman Empire	France; Savoy

Commanders and leaders
(Holy Roman Empire) Prince Eugene (Holy Roman Empire) Prince Vaudémont (Holy Roman Empire) Visconti; Prince Commerci †	(Kingdom of France) Vendôme (Spain) Philip V Duke of Mantua (Savoy) Victor Amadeus

Strength
26,000	30,000 – 35,000

Casualties and losses
2,000–2,700	3,500–4,000

The Battle of Luzzara took place in Lombardy on 15 August 1702 during the War of the Spanish Succession, between a combined French and Savoyard army under Louis Joseph, duc de Vendôme, and an Imperial force under Prince Eugene.

Conflict in Northern Italy centred around the Spanish-held Duchies of Milan and Mantua, which controlled access to the southern borders of both France and Austria. When the war began in 1701, Savoy allied with France; despite being out numbered, by February 1702 the Imperialists held the strategic initiative.

Vendôme took the offensive, taking Modena and Reggio in July, followed by Luzzara in August, a vital crossing point over the River Po. Threatened with being cut off from his supply base at Mirandola, Prince Eugene launched a series of attacks on the French positions at Luzzara.

Fighting continued until midnight, when the Imperialists ended their attack, having failed to break through; they suffered 2,000 casualties, the French lost around 4,000. While this ended Vendôme's offensive for the year, the French-Savoyard army had recovered nearly all the ground lost in 1701.

== Background ==
Northern Italy; key locations

The War of the Spanish Succession was triggered by the death in November 1700 of the childless Charles II of Spain. He named his heir as Philip of Anjou, grandson of Louis XIV of France, and on 16 November 1700, he became king of the Spanish Empire. In addition to mainland Spain, this included the Spanish Netherlands, large parts of Italy, and much of Central and South America. In 1701, disputes over territorial and commercial rights led to war between France, Spain, and the Grand Alliance, whose candidate was Charles, younger son of Leopold I, Holy Roman Emperor.

The war in Northern Italy centred on the Spanish-held Duchies of Milan and Mantua, which were considered essential to the security of Austria's southern borders. In March 1701, French troops occupied both cities; Victor Amadeus II, Duke of Savoy, allied with France, in return for which his daughter Maria Luisa married Philip V.

Over the next 12 months, Imperial general Prince Eugene of Savoy won a series of victories over French commander Villeroi, forcing him to withdraw behind the Adda river. He was unable to fully exploit this success as Leopold diverted resources from Italy to deal with problems elsewhere. Instead, he improvised, and in a surprise winter campaign, captured Villeroi at Cremona in February 1702, before laying siege to Modena. Determined to retain control of this region, Louis sent Vendôme to replace Villeroi, along with substantial reinforcements.

On 12 July, Vendôme was joined by Philip V, who had been visiting Spanish possessions in Italy, including Naples, Sicily, and Milan. This brought their combined army up to 30,000 – 35,000, including 10,000 Savoyards and five regiments of the Irish Brigade. In July, Vendôme captured Modena, then turned north to take Guastalla; on 26 July, he clashed with Imperial cavalry under Visconti at Santa Vittoria.

In early August, a detachment under Vendôme besieged Luzzara, a small town held by an Austrian garrison of 500, that controlled a bridge over the Po River. Prince Eugene now faced being cut off from his supply base at Mirandola; he abandoned his blockade of Mantua, and marched on Luzzara, telling its governor to hold on until he arrived. Many of his troops were tied up in garrisons at Mirandola, Bersello and Borgoforte, leaving him with a field army of 26,000. On 14 August, he reached Riva, a village north of Luzzara; here he learned the town had already surrendered, and the rest of Vendôme's army was moving into a camp just outside.

== Battle ==
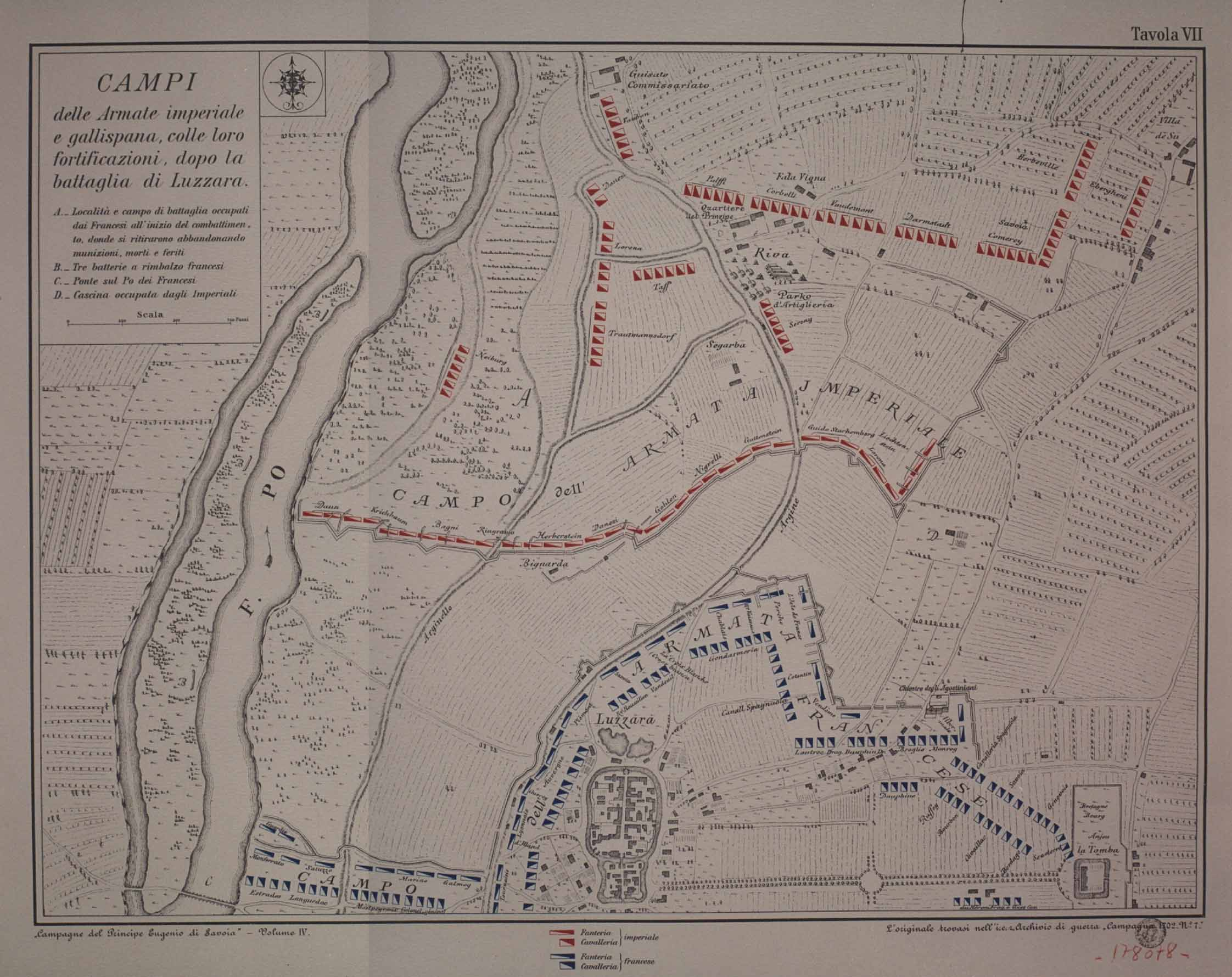
Battle Map; Imperial top (red), French-Savoyard bottom (blue)

Between Luzzara and the Po River, there were two earth embankments, built to prevent the river flooding the countryside; a high one just outside the town, and a smaller one close to the river (see Map). Prince Eugene planned to conceal his troops behind these, and take the French-Savoyard army by surprise; since their first task would be to collect forage, and water the horses, he hoped to take them unarmed. He split his forces into two lines, the left under Visconti and the Prince de Commerci, the right under Vaudémont, while he commanded the centre.

During the morning and early afternoon of 15 August, the Imperialists crossed the Po and moved into position, but were discovered by a French patrol. They quickly formed up, and around 5:00 pm, Prince Eugene ordered a general assault. His right wing was repulsed four times, with heavy losses on both sides, particularly among the Irish units and Albemarle's Regiment holding the French left. The struggle on the other wing was equally bloody; Commerci and his Danish infantry nearly broke through on several occasions, although he and several senior commanders were killed.

The broken ground meant cavalry played little part in the battle, which meant casualties were even higher as a proportion of the numbers actually engaged. The French managed to hold their lines until exhaustion and darkness ended the fighting round midnight, and neither army was able to resume the attack in the morning. Since Prince Eugene remained in possession of the battlefield, he claimed it as a victory, according to the practice of the time.

== Aftermath ==
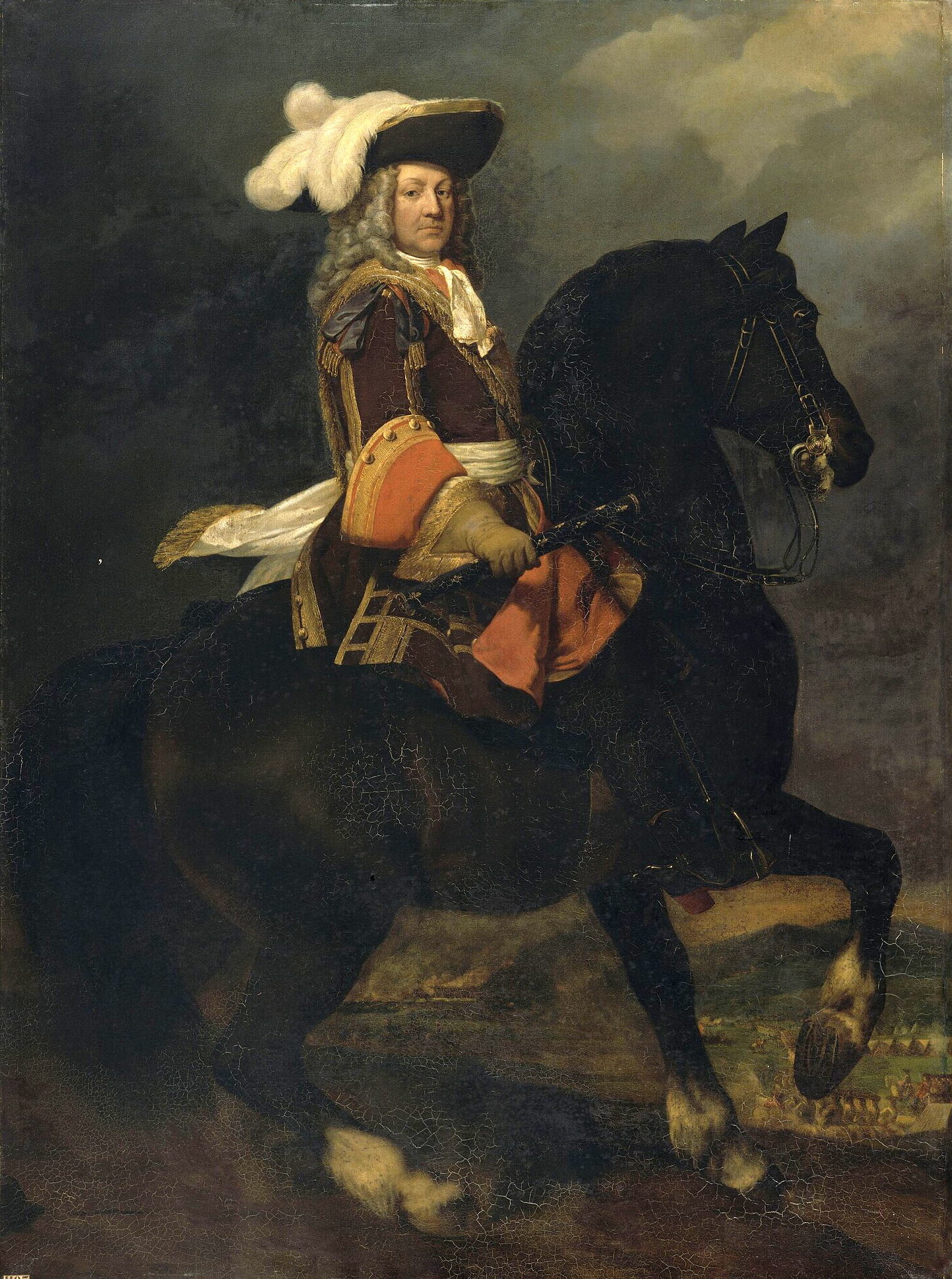
Louis Joseph, Duke of Vendôme 1654–1712

Although Vendôme suffered 4,000 casualties compared to Imperial losses of 2,000, most analysts consider the battle a draw, although it ended the French offensive; the two armies remained facing each other for the next month, occasionally bombarding each other. This allowed Prince Eugene to hold on until the two sides went into winter quarters, but the French-Savoyard forces regained all the ground lost in the previous twelve months.

Two days after the battle, Philip returned to Madrid; in January 1703, Prince Eugene was recalled to Vienna to take over as head of the Imperial War Council, and was replaced as commander in Italy by Starhemberg. The Italian theatre remained quiet in 1703; Starhemberg was badly outnumbered, while Vendôme spent most of it supporting a futile offensive through the Tyrol by Maximilian of Bavaria. In October 1703, Victor Amadeus II defected to the Alliance; over the next two years, Vendôme gradually conquered most of Lombardy.

In 1708, Prince Eugene commissioned a series of paintings recording his victories from Dutch artist Jan van Huchtenburg, which included Luzzara.

== Sources ==
- Bancks, John (1745). The history of Francis-Eugene Prince of Savoy (2010 ed.). Gale ECCO. ISBN 1170621236.
- Belsham, William (1836). History of Great Britain, From the Revolution, 1688, to the Conclusion of the Treaty of Amiens, 1802 (2017 ed.). Forgotten Books. ISBN 133076840X.
- Dhondt, Frederik (2015). De Ruysscher, D; Capelle, K (eds.). History in Legal Doctrine; Vattel and Réal De Curban on the Spanish Succession; the War of the Spanish Succession in Legal history; moving in new directions. Maklu. ISBN 9789046607589.
- Lynn, John (1999). The Wars of Louis XIV, 1667–1714 (Modern Wars In Perspective). Longman. ISBN 978-0582056299.
- MacSweeney, Marquis of (1930). "The Casualty List of the Infantry Regiment of Albemarle at the Battle of Luzzara, 15th August, 1702". The Journal of the Royal Society of Antiquaries of Ireland. 20 (1): 84–90. JSTOR 25513547.
- Savoy, Prince Eugene of (1811). Memoirs of Prince Eugene of Savoy. Ezra Sargeant.
- Somerset, Anne (2012). Queen Anne; the Politics of Passion. Harper. ISBN 978-0007203765.
- "The Battle of Luzzara, 1702". The Royal Collection.
- Bodart, Gaston (1908). Militär-historisches Kriegs-Lexikon (1618–1905).
