= Hôtel de Villeroy (Paris, 1st arrondissement) =

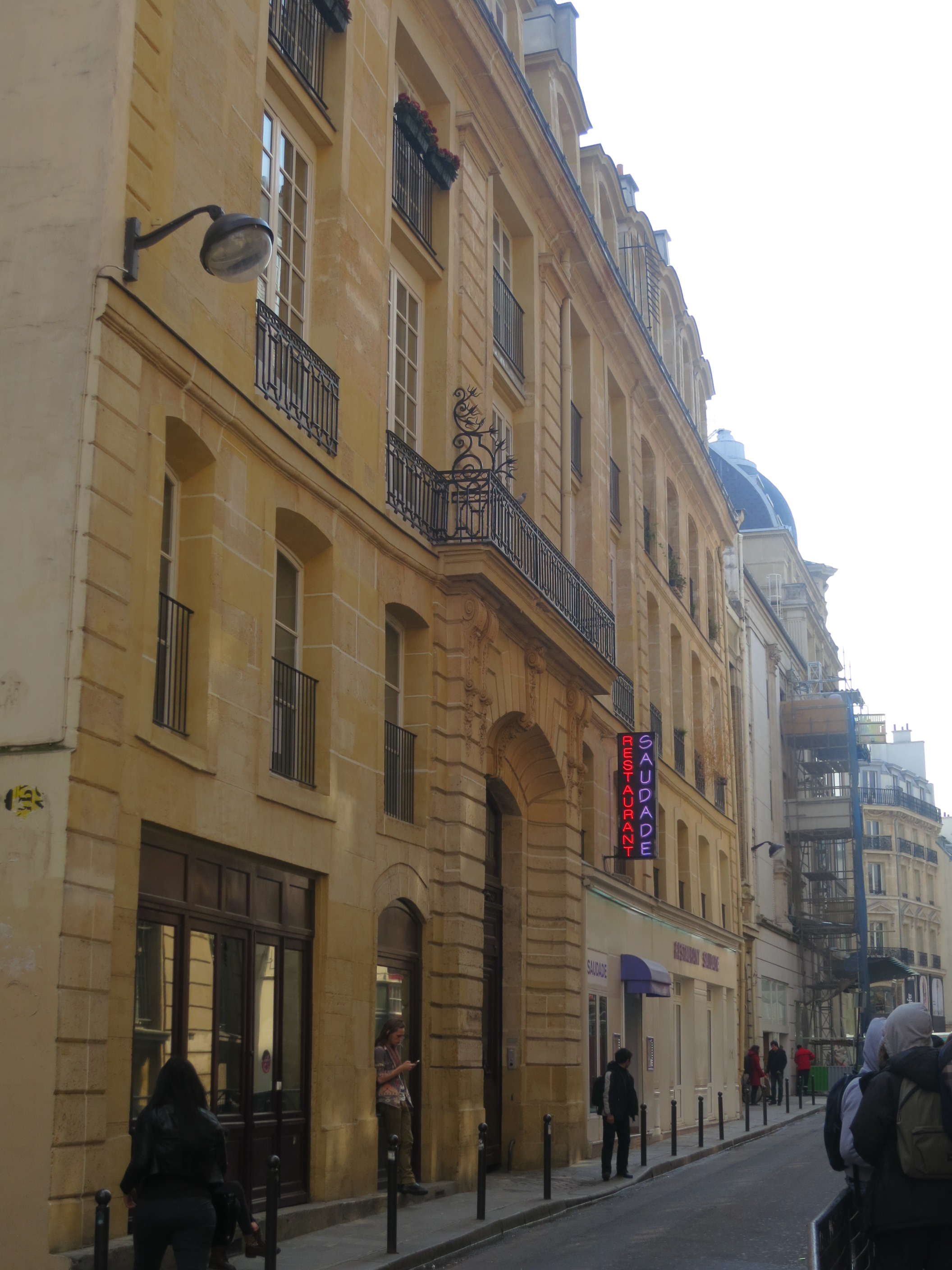
- Interactive map of Hôtel de Villeroy
- Location: Paris, France
- Coordinates: 48.8601°N 2.3457°E
- Type: Hôtel particulier
- Monument historique: PA00085842

The hôtel de Villeroy (French pronunciation: [otɛl də vilʁwa]), also the hôtel de Villeroy Bourbon ([- buʁbɔ̃]) or hôtel de la Poste ([la pɔst]), is a hôtel particulier, a type of large townhouse of France, at 34 rue des Bourdonnais, 9 rue des Déchargeurs, 17 rue des Halles (former rue de la Limace) in the 1st arrondissement of Paris. It is a designated monument historique.

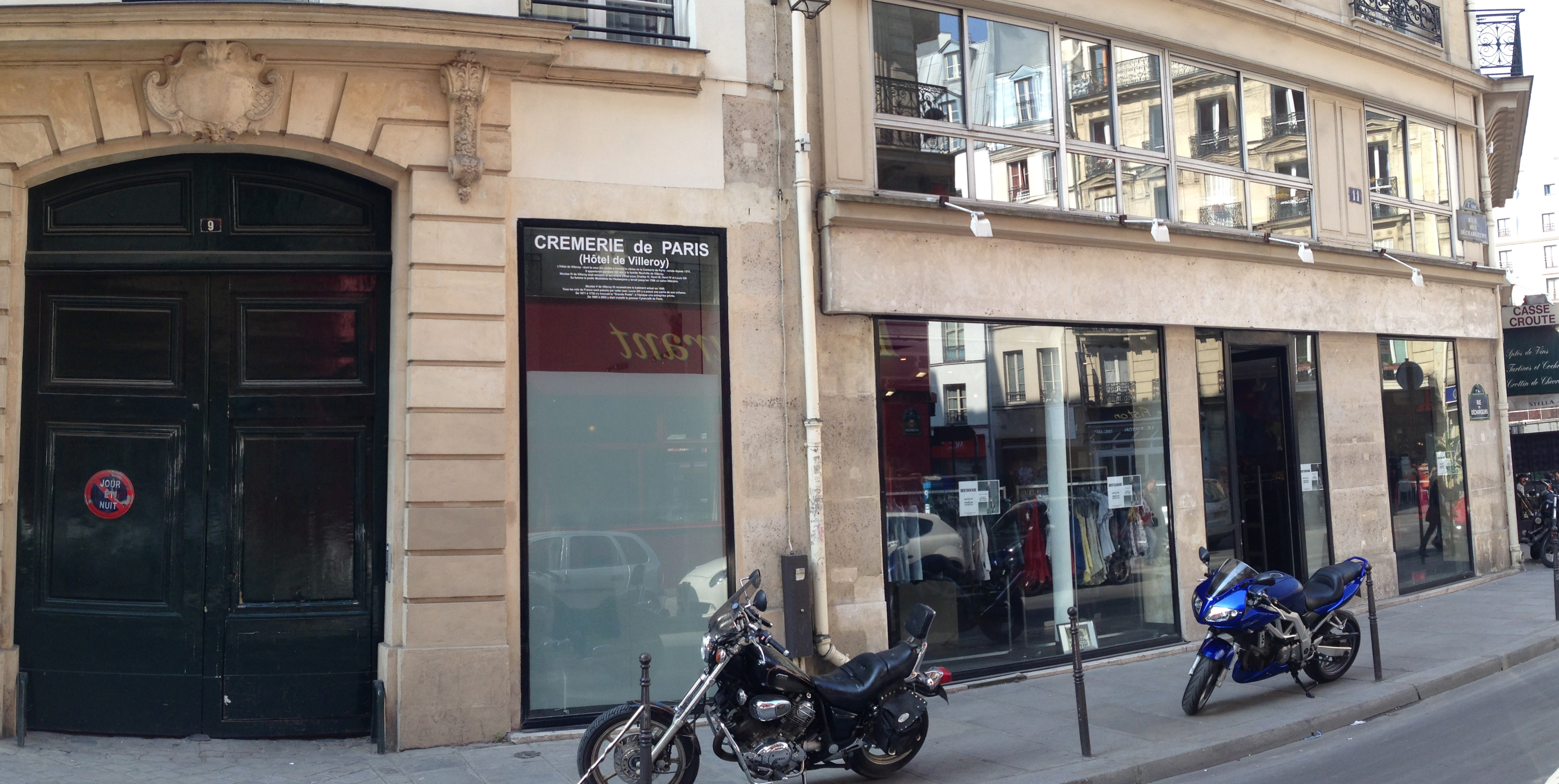
Rue des Déchargeurs entrance to the Hôtel de Villeroy next to the Cremerie de Paris.

== Description ==
The hôtel de Villeroy is closely linked to the history of the Neufville family (Dukes of Villeroy) as well as the history of the Kingdom of France. The first of its buildings were erected circa 1370 on the rue des Bourdonnais side of its current location.

Under Nicolas the 4th of Neufville de Villeroy (who at the time was one of the most important ministers of the Kingdom of France) the building was elaborated, progressively becoming a center for literature. His grandson Nicolas Villeroy the 5th razed the existing buildings to rebuild them in 1640 keeping the existing cellars. The Villeroy family sold the building in 1671 to the Pajot & Rouillé family, known for their postal service business. Much later under ownership of the department store À la Belle Jardinière and in disrepair with an open pit exposed during development of the adjoining Les Halles (the pit then known as "le trou des Halles") the building space nearly became a large automotive parking lot. Thanks in part to the work of a concerned citizen the building was given monument status protection by the French Ministry of Culture in 1984 and subsequently renovated.

A key architectural feature of the building in the form of a grand staircase dating from 1640 has had its original character preserved. The building is one of the few remaining structures of the former aristocratic southwest Les Halles that during the late 16th and early 17th centuries became integrated into a dense network of bourgeois and common houses. It has a second entrance at 9 rue des Déchargeurs. At the time of its construction it bordered the rue de la Limace that was later razed to make way for the creation of the rue des Halles in 1868.

== Nicolas V de Villeroy era, 1617-1671 ==
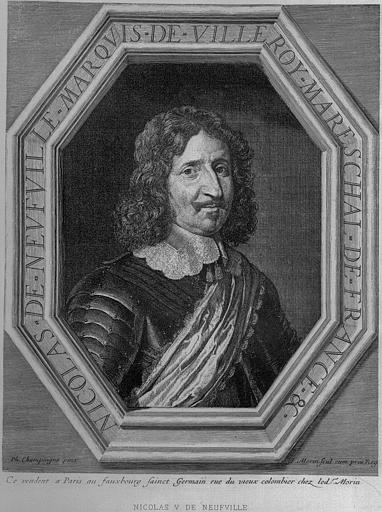
Marshal-duke Nicolas V de Neufville de Villeroy

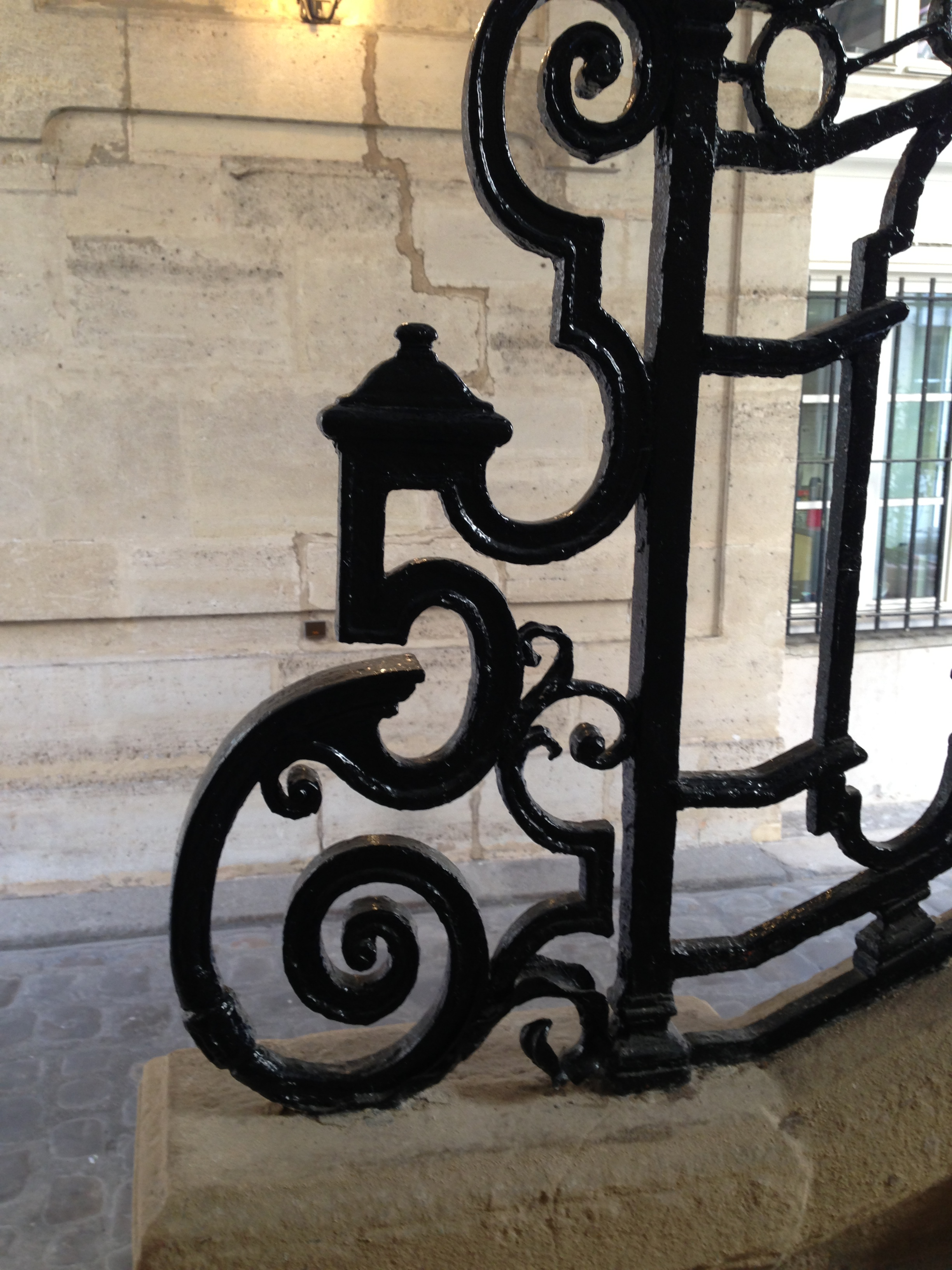
Detail of the number 5 symbol featured at the bottom of the lower railing of the grand staircase

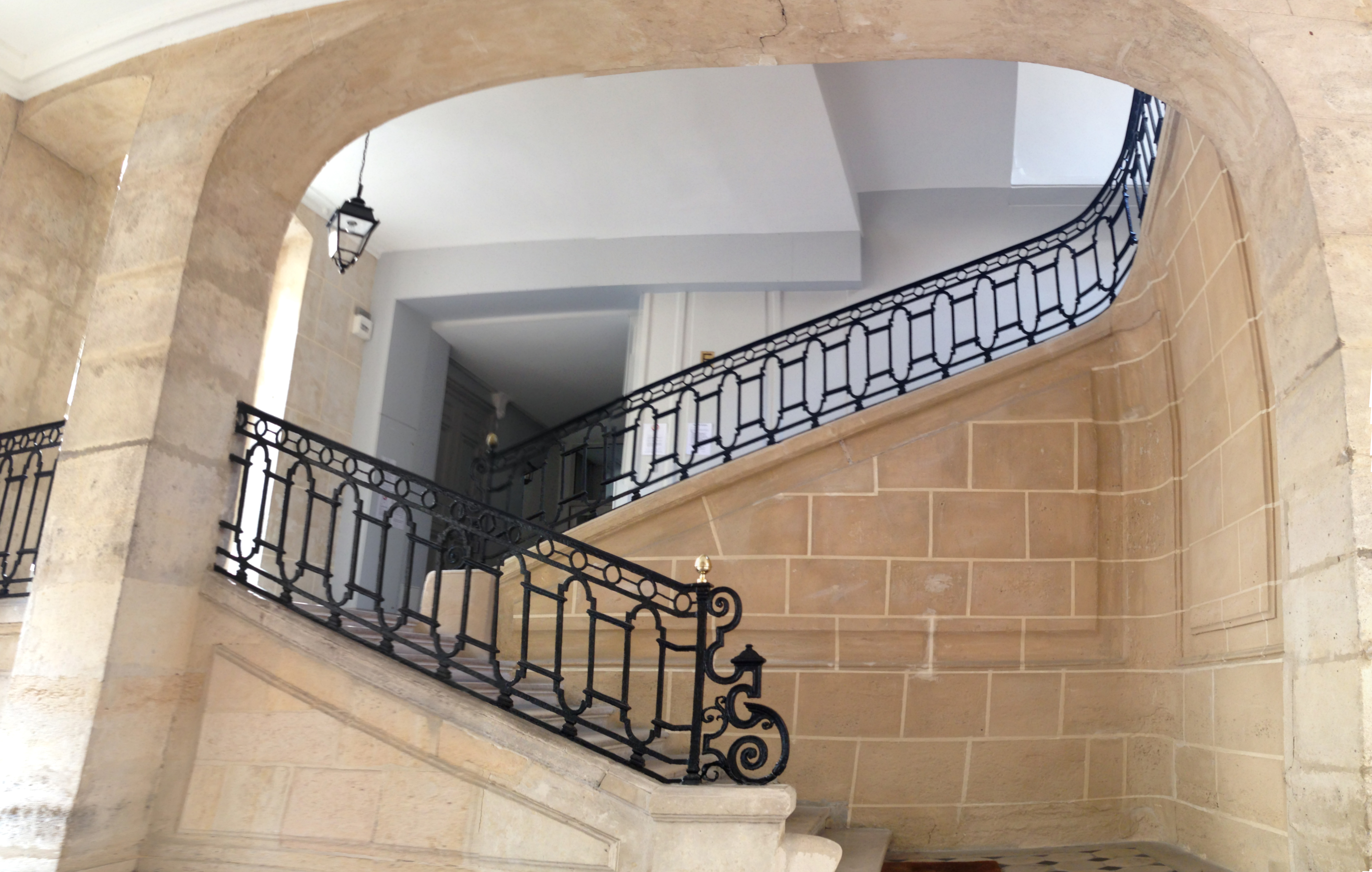
The grand staircase of the Hôtel de Villeroy.

The building was constructed in 1640 by the Duke Nicolas de Neufville de Villeroy, the then Marshal of France. The name of the building's architect remains unknown to this day. Nicolas V de Villeroy was raised in the court of King Louis XIII. After the death of the King, Nicolas V became a tutor for the new young King Louis XIV starting in 1646. The young King and his brother Prince Philippe of Orleans resided in the Royal Palace but they often went to the Hotel de Villeroy where they could play with the children of Nicolas Villeroy V, Catherine Neufville de Villeroy and François de Villeroy.

From this childhood spent between the Royal Palace and the Hotel de Villeroy a lifelong friendship formed between King Louis XIV and François de Neufville de Villeroy. Upon his passing King Louis XIV's will gave François de Neufville de Villeroy the role of educator for the King's great grandson King Louis XV.

Evidence of Nicolas V's former presence at the Hotel de Villeroy can be found in the number '5' forged into the still existing railings of the grand staircase. This staircase figured in some of the photos of the celebrated French photographer Eugène Atget.

== Hôtel de la Poste era 1671 - 1738 ==
From 1689 to 1738 the Hotel de Villeroy housed Paris' first post office. The Royal French Postal services were operated by Leon Pajot and Louis Rouillé. The Pajot & Rouillé family operated 800 "relais postaux" all over France. The most southern relais were located in Venice and Rome. Horses carried mail from the Hotel de Villeroy to the different relais. Mail was also exchanged with the postal services of the Thurn and Taxis family. The company was run by 3 generations of the family. Their grandson Louis Leon Pajot, last "maitre des Postes", collected valuable scientific instruments which he left to the Académie des Sciences.

His International mail exchange partner was Anselm Franz, 2nd Prince of Thurn and Taxis who disposed of a Postal service in the Habsburg territories and who was based in the two (later destroyed) Postal Mansions: the Palais Tour et Taxis in Brussels and in the Palais Thurn und Taxis in Frankfort, Germany.

Pajot & Rouillé became one of the wealthiest families in France but their postal empire came to an end 21 mai 1738 upon a decision of King Louis XV to withdraw the postal license. After the French Revolution the story of the Pajot & Rouillé Post was forgotten in Paris, but it remained in the memory of the Thurn & Taxis family who did not want the same fate for their own postal empire.

== Les Halles foodmarket ==
During the time of the Halles de Paris the building was used to store food products and on the side of the rue des Déchargeurs was put into place a cremerie. The building today constitutes one of the largest 17th century structures in the center of Paris. Its courtyard links the two sides of the building found at 34 rue Bourdonnais and 9 rue des Déchargeurs. The building was classified as a historic monument in 1992. Today the building houses a number of inhabitants and businesses.

== 1986 Return of Telecommunications - Phone Boutique - Internet cafe ==
Johannes, 11th Prince of Thurn and Taxis

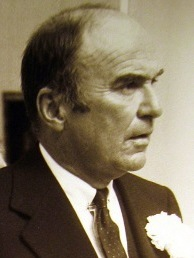
Johannes 11th Prince of Thurn & Taxis and heir of Postmaster Anselm Franz 2nd Prince of Thurn & Taxis

was very interested in his family's postal history. 1986 he came to Paris where he met a young student. He showed him the old Postal mansion, the Hotel Villeroy Bourbon and told him about his ancestor Anselm Franz, 2nd Prince of Thurn and Taxis coming from Brussels and Frankfurt by horse.

The idea came up to reactivate the Spirit of Telecommunications that according to Johannes Thurn & Taxis must have remained in the still existing walls. While the former postal palaces of the Thurn & Taxis Post in Brussels and in Frankfurt had been destroyed, the Hotel de la Poste / Hotel de Villeroy Bourbon in Paris was still around. The start was a small Phone Boutique located on 11 rue des Halles a few meters down the street (today Cremerie de Paris N°2). The Boutique was helped by a few Thalers Maximilian Karl, 6th Prince of Thurn and Taxis had received 1867 in compensation for the nationalisation of the families Postal Company, Thurn-und-Taxis Post.

Johannes Thurn & Taxis died 1990 but he left to the young student his passion for Telecommunications and a friend, Aimée de Heeren who had been a Secret Service agent during WW2 and the partner of Joseph P. Kennedy Jr.

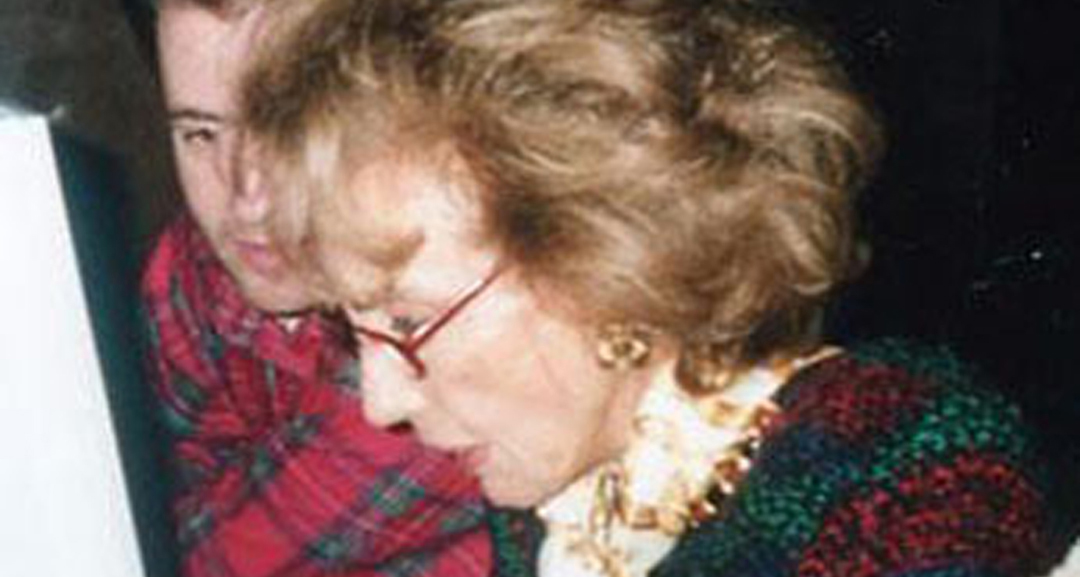
Aimée de Heeren, WW2 Secret Service Agent, early resistant and friend of Johannes Thurn & Taxis. Used a jewel left by Coco Chanel to help the reopening of Cremerie de Paris. Picture taken 2003 at the Cybercafe in the Hotel de Villeroy Bourbon

With the help of the phones and a little jewel left by Coco Chanel to Aimée de Heeren the student was able to get a loan to buy the historic Cremerie de Paris. Two hundred fifty five years after the departure of the postal services, communications returned to the Hotel de Villeroy. In 1993 the former "Cremerie de Paris", a milkstore located on the rue des Déchargeurs side of the Hotel de Villeroy became a Sony Technology center, eventually becoming one of the first Internet cafés.

The Internet cafe opened at a time Hotels were not yet equipped with a web connection. American tourist that were already online had difficulties to find a connection in Paris. This brought them to the Internet Cafe located at Cremerie de Paris, Hotel de Villeroy Bourbon. Among them many Tech pioneers which would have been difficult to meet, like the assistant of Jon Postel, inventor of the .com domain system, an astronaute that had been on the first flight to the Moon and several young people now in charge of major US Technology corporations. Their influence contributed to several websites invented at the Hotel de Villeroy web cafe.

== Phone Book of the World ==
Phone Book of the World.com or in short PBof.com is a global Telephone directory still edited from the Hotel de Villeroy Bourbon. The roots of the directory go back to the times the mansion was the "Hotel de la Poste" (1671 - 1738) a place in the history of the Pajot and Rouillé and the Thurn und Taxis families. The gate of the Hôtel de Villeroy Bourbon, on the 11 rue des Dechargeurs side of the monument, is visible on the homepage of the directory. Phone Book of the World was created 2000, january 25. Inside PBof.com every major city of the world shows the distance from the city center to the historic Telecom Landmark in Paris.

== White pages ==
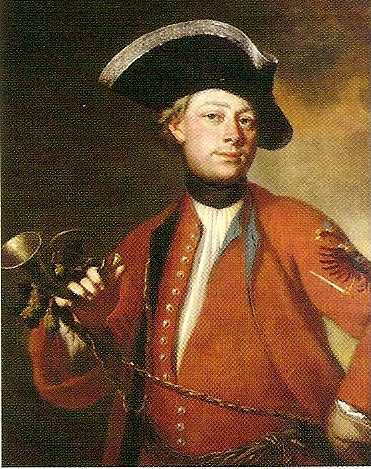
Postmaster Anselm Franz 2nd Prince of Thurn & Taxis part of the logo of many Whitepages. From 1710 to 1738 the Postmaster used to come to the Hotel de Villeroy Bourbon by horse from the Palais Tour et Taxis in Brussels and the Palais Thurn und Taxis in Frankfurt

With the help of Aimée de Heeren who came to the internet cafe at the Hotel de Villeroy Bourbon every week and who had met Alexander Graham Bell, the inventor of the phone, when she was a young woman, the expression "whitepages" was registered in over 50 different countries, a process which was very complicated during the early years of the internet as a local address or other requirements were needed in many countries.

The white pages for France, Brazil, Germany, Italy, Poland, India, Mexico, Taiwan and 40 other countries are now edited from the Hôtel de Villeroy, giving the old Paris Postal Building a unique place in telecom history.

The old postmaster Anselm Franz, 2nd Prince of Thurn and Taxis who came to the house by horse and the Thurn & Taxis post horn are part of the logo.

== Crémerie de Paris ==
Crémerie de Paris is located on the rue des Déchargeurs side of the Hôtel de Villeroy at the corner of rue des Dechargeurs and rue des Halles. For 100 years (1869-1970) it was a milk store connected to the Les Halles food market. In 1993 it was acquired by the little Electrica for Sony Phone Store located on 11 rue des Halles (today petite Cremerie de Paris N°2). After having operated as an Internet café opened in the early years of the Internet, the Cremerie was converted into a brand expo center.

Many notable brands have organised Pop Up Stores and Pop Up Cafes (located at the opposite restaurant Gladines / Cremerie de Paris N°3):

- 2012 June "Nike Barber Shop" organised by the US sports brand Nike.
- 2012 September "Boutique Adopte Un Mec" organised by the French dating site AdopteUnMec.
- 2012 October Expo and Pop Up Store UGG Australia.
- 2013 June Motorcycle Expo organised by the British brand Triumph Motorcycles Ltd.
- 2013 July Pop Up Store "G-Shock" organised by the Japanese manufacturer Casio.
- 2013 October Washing powder expo "My Omo Store" organised by the Dutch-British food brand Unilever.
- 2014 June Pokémon Center Paris. Pokémon is the world's most famous video game company edited by the Japanese brand Nintendo. The co-inventor of Pokémon and video game composer Junichi Masuda came to the event. Fascinated by France and its history, he selected Cremerie de Paris at the Hotel de Villeroy Bourbon to be the location for the first Pokémon store to open in Europe. The 3 week pop-up store has attracted a long waiting line going all along the rue des Déchargeurs and the rue de Rivoli.

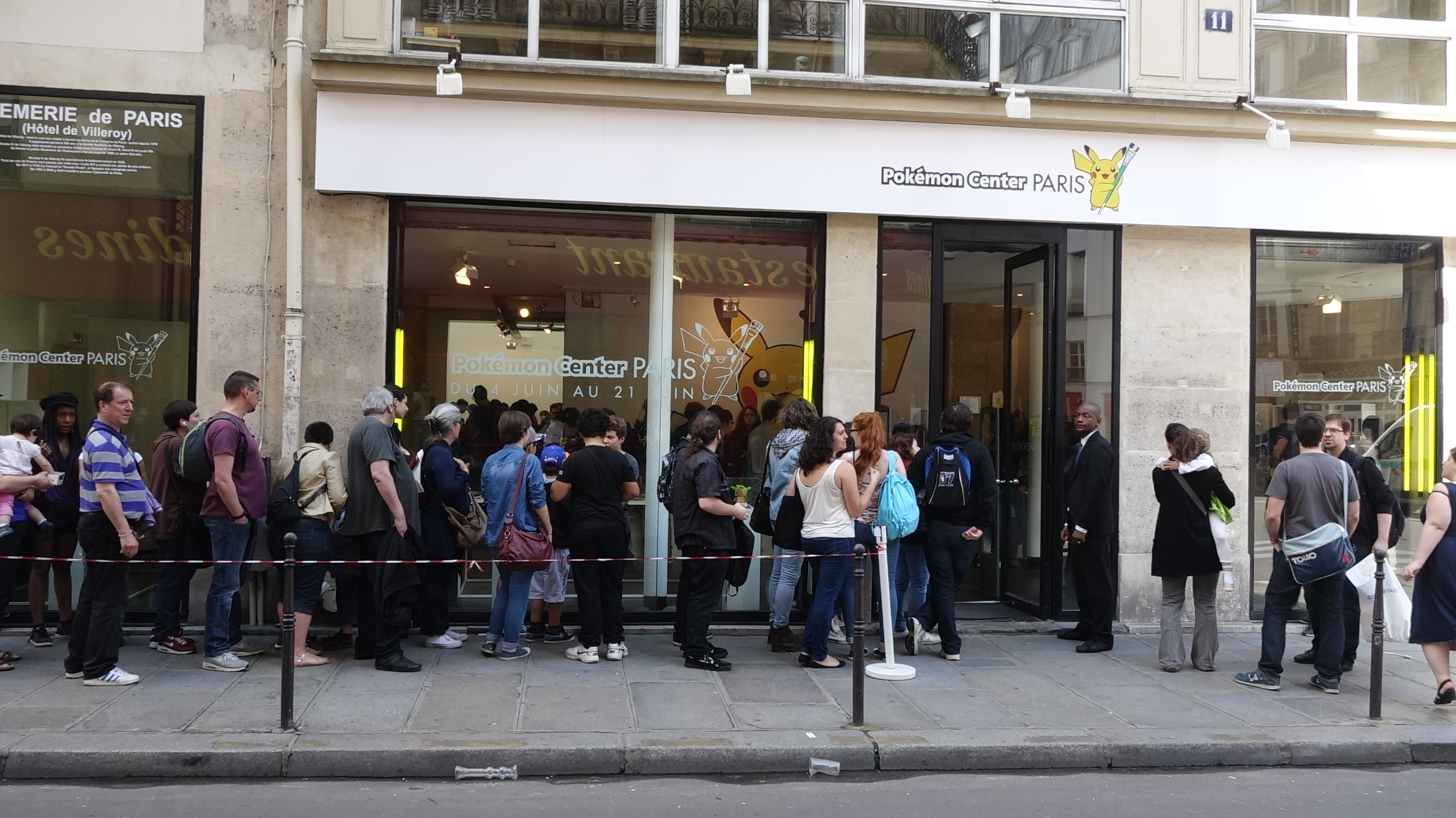
Cremerie de Paris, 11 Rue des Déchargeurs in june 2014 during the Pokemon Center expo Pokemon.

- 2015 February Renault presented the third version of the Renault Twingo car line at the Cremerie de Paris during a 2-week expo called "La verité sur les filles". The expo was animated by the French actresses Bérengère Krief and Nora Hamzawi.
- 2017 October Siemens Connected Gallery, interactive expo for Europe's largest industrial manufacturer.
- 2019 Nov Second Pokémon Expo organised by the clothing brand Celio.
- 2022 March Launch of the smartphone Realme GT2 Pro organised by Realme part of BBK Electronics, the World's second largest phone manufacturer .
- 2023 December : Launch of a limited edition Scotch Whisky by Chivas Regal in collaboration with the French artist Dolly Cohen. The event is organised by the world's second largest wine and spirits group Pernod_Ricard.

Most expos and pop-up stores have been accompanied by TV commercials and video clips visible in the Phone Book of the World. The gate of the Hôtel de Villeroy can be seen at moments in many films.

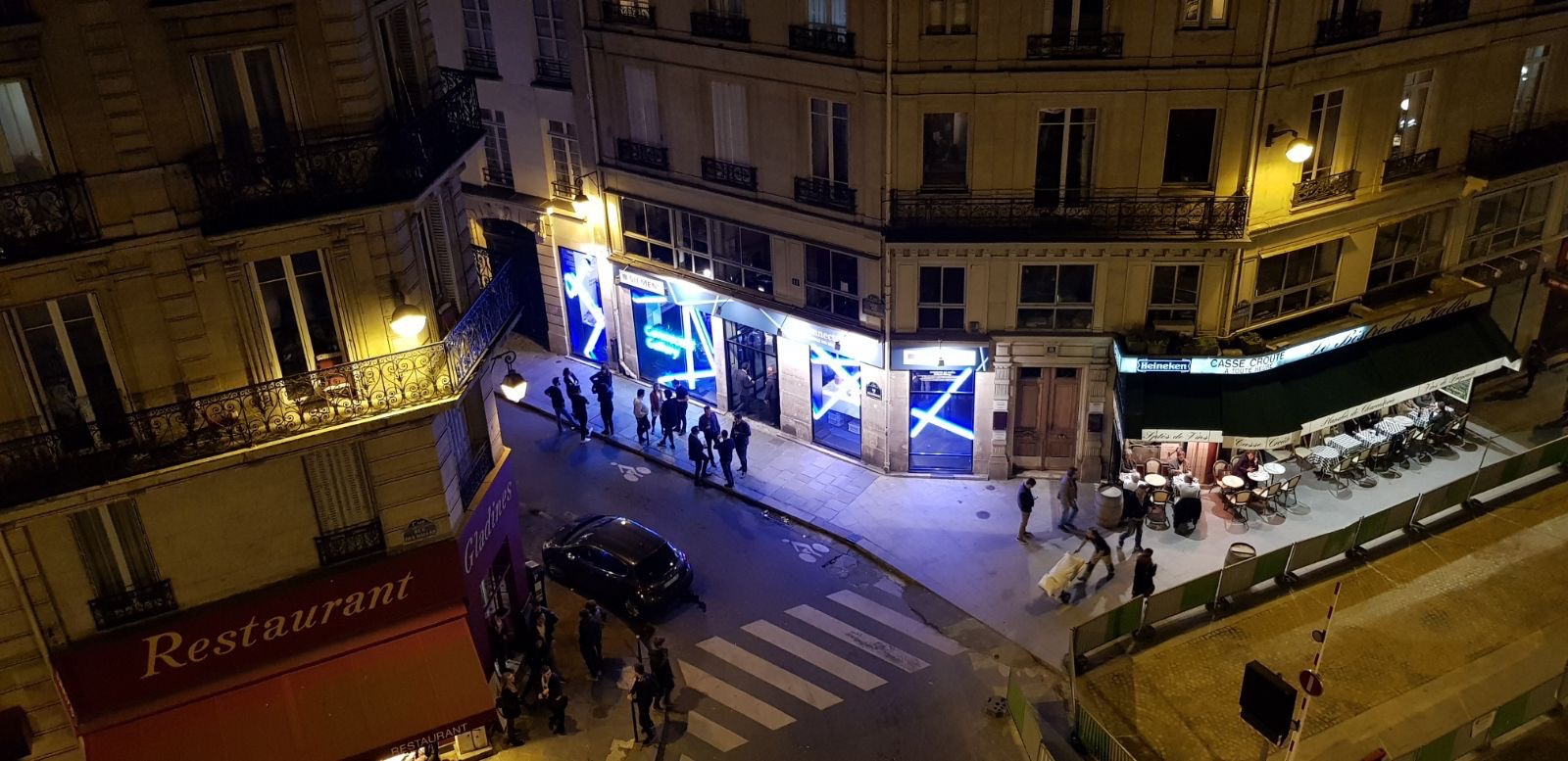
Hôtel de Villeroy Bourbon, Rue des Dechargeurs le 2017 October 12 during a reception for the industrial manufacturer Siemens.

== Movies filmed at Crémerie de Paris ==
- 2017 January Remise de Peine by Pierre Salvadori, with Adèle Haenel, Pio Marmaï, and Audrey Tautou. The Cremerie was made the setting for a jewelry store.
- 2019 August 14 Emily in Paris by Darren Star. Cremerie de Paris and the gate of the Hotel de Villeroy Bourbon were a Gym for the actress Lily Collins.

== See also ==
- Neufville de Villeroy family
