= Charles, Prince of Commercy =

Charles
- Prince de Commercy, Count de Rosnay
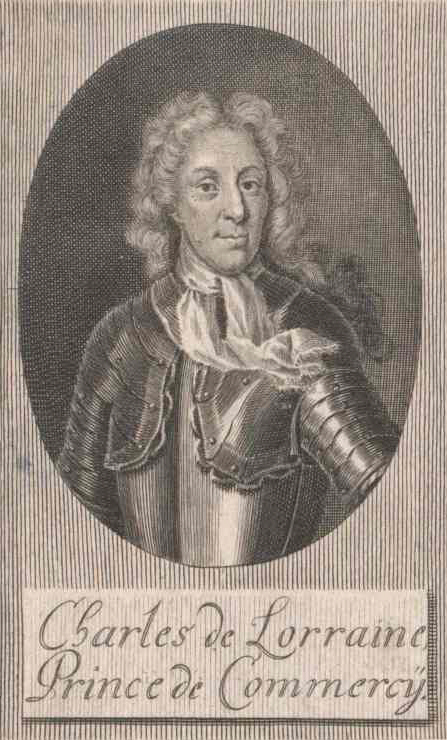
- Charles
- Born: 11 July 1661; Bar-le-Duc, Duchy of Bar
- Died: 15 August 1702 (aged 41); Cremona, Duchy of Mantua
Names
- Charles François de Lorraine
- House: House of Lorraine
- Father: François de Lorraine-Elbeuf
- Mother: Anne of Lorraine

Charles de Lorraine, Prince de Commercy (11 July 1661 – 15 August 1702), was a field marshal of the Holy Roman Empire and a military advisor to Prince Eugene of Savoy. He acquired military prominence after leading imperial troops in the Great Turkish War, in the Nine Years' War, and the War of Spanish Succession.

== Life ==
Charles de Lorraine was born 11 July 1661 in Bar-le-Duc, in the Duchy of Bar. He belonged to the Elbeuf cadet branch of the ruling dynasty of that duchy, domiciled in France. His father was Francois de Lorraine, Comte de Lillebonne, a cavalry commander in the French army. His mother was Anne of Lorraine, daughter of Duke Charles IV. His paternal grandmother was Catherine Henriette de Bourbon, an illegitimate daughter of Henry IV of France.

Commercy was never married and had no children. He died during the War of Spanish Succession in the Battle of Luzzara. He was Duke of Joyeuse but after Charles entered into the service of Leopold I, Holy Roman Emperor, Louis XIV confiscated the duchy and gave it to Charles' younger brother Jean Paul.

== Military career ==
Initially Charles of Lorraine joined the French army. In May 1684, he abandoned the French army, in order to join the troops of the Holy Roman Empire. Commercy joined as a volunteer in the imperial forces in the Great Turkish War. In the beginning of the war he served as a consultant of Charles V, Duke of Lorraine, in his negotiations with Friedrich VII, Margrave of Baden-Durlach. In 1685 he took part in the siege of Nové Zámky, where he was injured. In the same year he was one of the commanders in the second Battle of Buda (1686), where he was also injured.

On 11 October 1685 he was promoted to General Field Sergeant. On 23 November 1685 Emperor Leopold I granted him a personal guard of cuirassiers to reward him for his achievement during the Great Turkish War. In 1688 Charles of Lorraine was one of the commanders during the siege of Belgrade. After the successful siege of the city he was promoted to Lieutenant-General. Commercy during those years became one of the most trusted lieutenants of Eugene of Savoy.

After the outbreak of the Nine Years' War, he went to the Rhineland as a general of the Holy Roman Empire. In 1690 he defended the city of Mainz against the French army and in 1691 he attended the Congress of the League of Augsburg at The Hague. In 1692 he was promoted to cavalry general. In the same year he took part in the siege of Embrun, during which he was shot. On 12 May 1696 he was promoted to imperial Field Marshal and led Austrian troops in the War of the Spanish Succession. He took part in the Battle of Carpi and in the Battle of Chiari on 1 September 1701. On 1 February 1702 he was one of the commanders of the during the Battle of Cremona. He died on 15 August 1702 during the Battle of Luzzara in Cremona, after being shot several times. Charles of Lorraine was buried in Nancy in the graveyard of the House of Lorraine.

== Ancestry ==
Ancestors of Charles, Prince of Commercy

8. Charles de Lorraine, Duc d'Elbeuf
4. Charles de Lorraine, Duc d'Elbeuf
9. Marguerite Chabot, Comtesse de Charny
2. François de Lorraine-Elbeuf, Comte de Lillebonne
10. Henry IV of France
5. Catherine Henriette de Bourbon, légitimée de France
11. Gabrielle d'Estrées, Duchesse d'Etampes
1. Charles de Lorraine-Lillebonne, Prince de Commercy
12. Francis II, Duke of Lorraine
6. Charles IV, Duke of Lorraine
13. Countess Christina of Salm
3. Anne of Lorraine
14. Claude de Cusance, Baron de Belvoir
7. Béatrice de Cusance, Baronne de Belvoir
15. Ernestine van Witthem, Countess van Walrain
