= Huchtenburg =

Two Dutch Golden Age painters

Battle of the Boyne between James II and William III, 11 June 1690, Jan van Huchtenburg.

J(oh)an and Jacob van Huchtenburg (also known as Hughtenburg or Hugtenburg(h)) were two Dutch Golden Age painters in the second half of the seventeenth century. Both brothers were natives of Haarlem, moved to Paris, but died in Amsterdam. The main source about their lives is from Arnold Houbraken. Some of the information from the 19th century is contradictive.

Jacob van Huchtenburg (1644, Haarlem – bur. January 8, 1675, Amsterdam) studied under Nicolaes Pieterszoon Berchem. In 1662, he went to Italy and stayed in Rome until 1667. On his way back to Holland he stayed in Paris for more than a year, where he probably met up with his brother Jan. In 1669, he joined the Haarlem artists' guild. His pictures are probably confounded with those of his brother. He became well-to-do and lived on Prinsengracht. One is in the Brukenthal Museum, Sibiu.

Prince Eugene of Savoy at Oudenarde (detail) by Jan van Huchtenburg. Eugene had long employed Huchtenburg to depict his battle scenes.

Jan van Huchtenburg (bapt. November 20, 1647, Haarlem – bur. July 2, 1733, Amsterdam), was a famous Dutch horse and battle painter, like Esaias van de Velde and Philip Wouwermans. He was first taught by Thomas Wijck. On his way to visit his brother in Rome, he may not have got further than Paris, where he served under Antony Francis van der Meulen in the Manufacture des Gobelins employing him for illustrating, sketching or designing.

In 1670, he settled at Haarlem, where he married Elisabeth Mommes. It seems he practised and kept a dealers shop in Haarlem or in the Hague. His style had now merged into an imitation of Wouwerman and Van der Meulen, which could not fail to produce pretty pictures of hunts and robber camps, the faculty of painting horses and men in action and varied dress being the chief point of attraction. Huchtenburg assisted Gerrit Berckheyde and painted his people and horses.

Later, Huchtenburg ventured on cavalry skirmishes and engagements of regular troops generally, and these were admired by Prince Eugene of Savoy and King William III, who gave the painter sittings, and commissioned him to record on canvas the chief incidents of the battles they fought upon the continent of Europe. When he died at Bloemgracht in the Jordaan in 1733, Huchtenburg had done much by his pictures and prints to make Prince Eugene, King William and Marlborough popular. Though clever in depicting a mile or a skirmish of dragoons, he remained second to Philip Wouvermans in accuracy of drawing, and inferior to Van der Meulen in the production of landscapes. But, nevertheless, he was a clever and spirited master, with great facility of hand and considerable natural powers of observation.

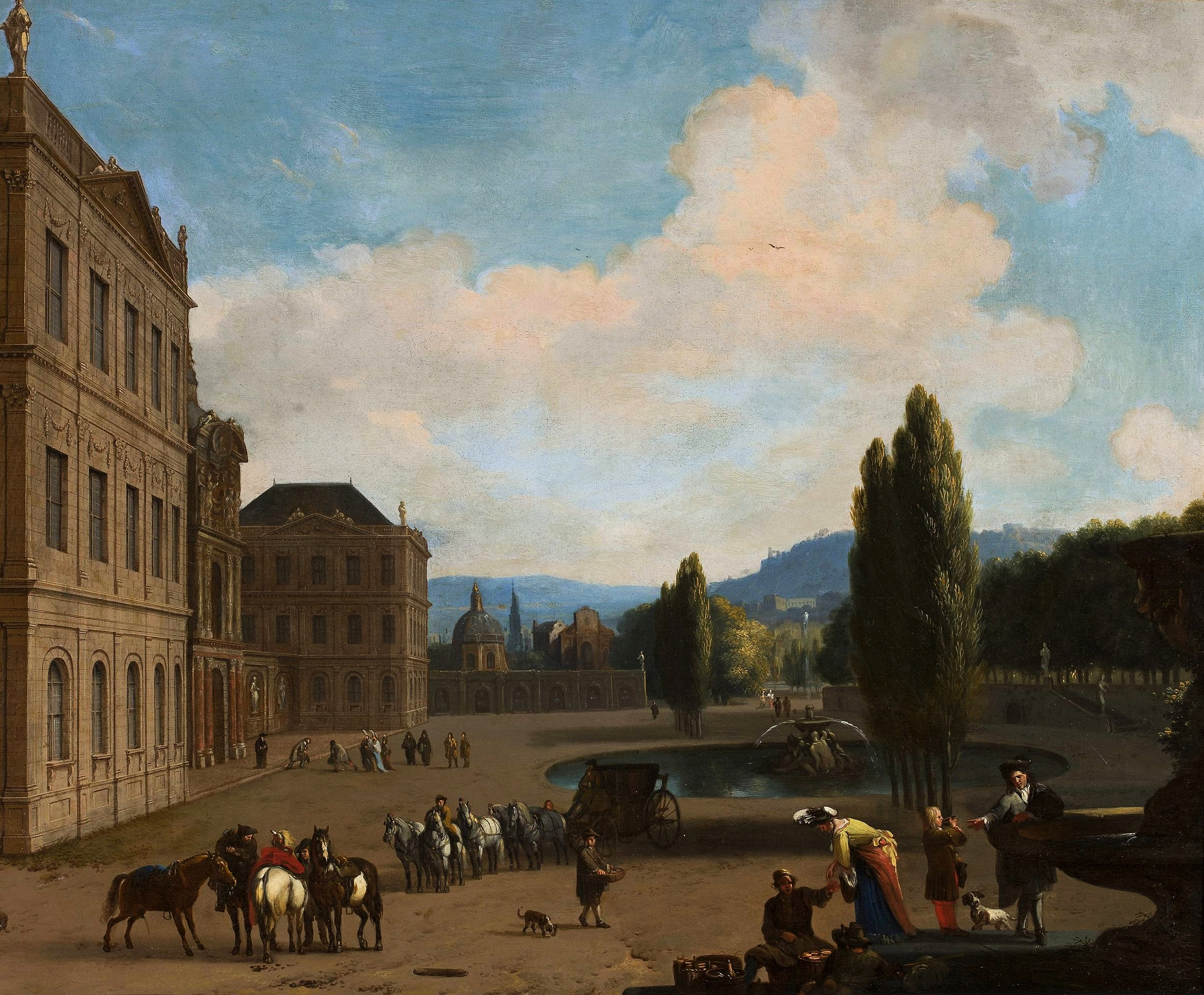
Southern landscape with companionship in a park and a large country house (c. 1662) by Jan van Huchtenburg, National Museum in Warsaw

The earliest date on his pictures is 1674, when he executed the Stag-Hunt in the Museum of Berlin, and the Fight with Robbers in the Liechtenstein Museum at Vienna. A Skirmish at Fleurus (1690) in the Brussels gallery seems but the precursor of larger and more powerful works, such as the Siege of Namur (1695) in the Belvedere at Vienna, where William III is seen in the foreground accompanied by Max Emmanuel, the Bavarian elector. Three years before, Huchtenburg had had sittings from Prince Eugene and William III. After 1696 he regularly served as court painter to Prince Eugene, and we have at [a] Galleria Sabauda a series of ten or eleven canvases, all of the same size depicting the various battles of the great hero, commencing with the Battle of Zenta (1697), Battle of Chiari (1701), Battle of Luzzara (1702), Battle of Blenheim (1704), Battle of Cassano (1705), Battle of Turin (1706), Battle of Oudenaarde (1708), Battle of Malplaquet (1709), Battle of Petrovaradin (1716) ending with the Battle of Belgrade (1717). Had the Duke of Marlborough been fond of art he would doubtless have possessed many works of our artist. All that remained in 1911 at Blenheim Palace, however, was a couple of sketches of battles, which were probably sent to Churchill by his great contemporary.

In 1911, the pictures of Huchtenburg were not very numerous in public galleries. There was one in the National Gallery, London, another at the Louvre. But Copenhagen had four, Dresden six, Gotha two, and Munich had the well-known composition of Tallart taken Prisoner at Blenheim in 1704.

== Works ==
- Boekje-pienter.eu
- Britannica.com
- Battle of Chiari
- Dorotheum.com (JPG)
