= Neuville-sur-Saône =

- Commune
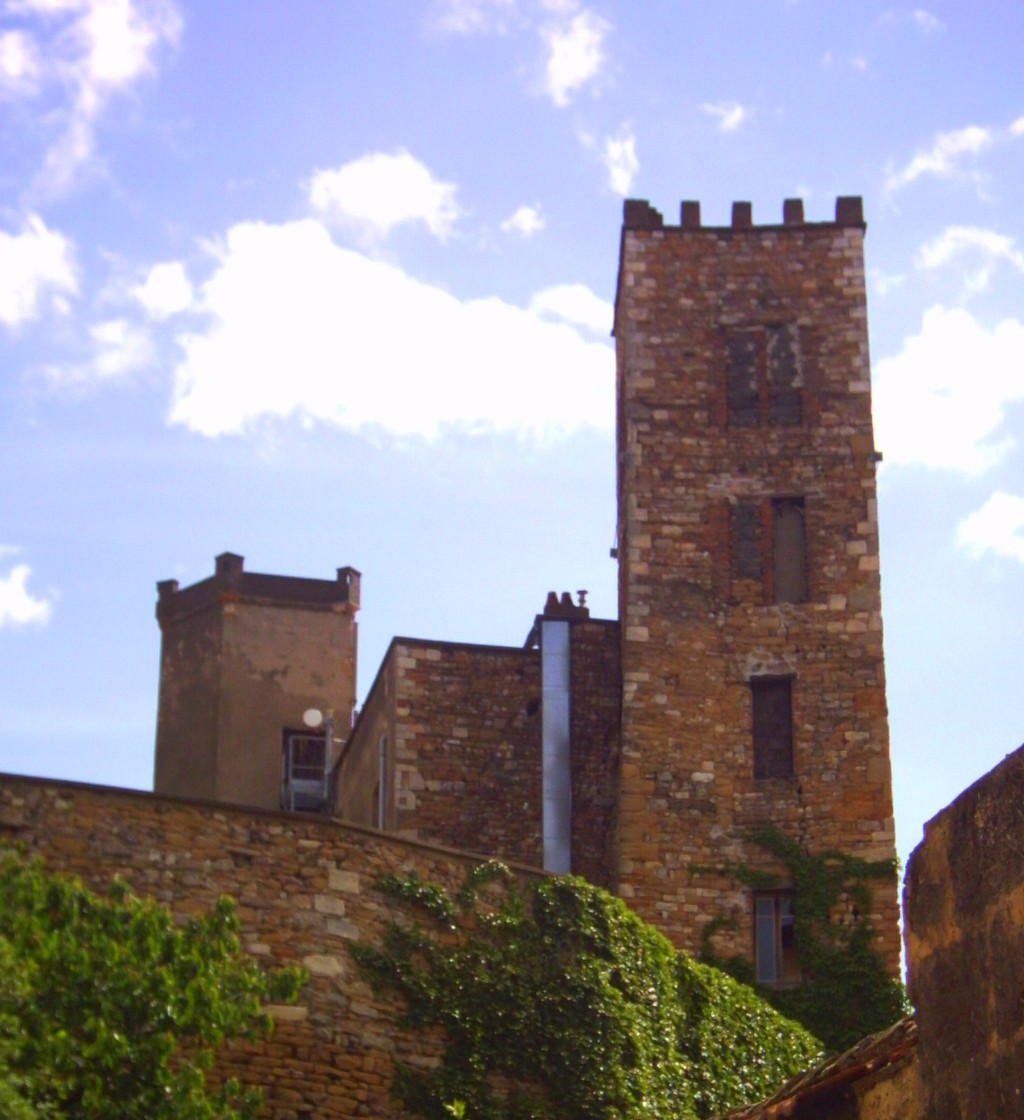
- The towers of the old château of Vimy

- Coat of arms
- Location of Neuville-sur-Saône
- Location within France Location within Auvergne-Rhône-Alpes
- Coordinates: 45°52′34″N 4°50′28″E
- Country: France
- Region: Auvergne-Rhône-Alpes
- Metropolis: Lyon Metropolis
- Arrondissement: Lyon

Government
  - Mayor (2026–32): Youcef Bourezg
- Area^{1}: 5.47 km^{2} (2.11 sq mi)
- Highest elevation: 310 m (1,020 ft)
- Lowest elevation: 168 m (551 ft)
- Population (2023): 7,812
  - Density: 1,430/km^{2} (3,700/sq mi)
- Time zone: UTC+01:00 (CET)
  - Summer (DST): UTC+02:00 (CEST)
- INSEE/Postal code: 69143 /69250
- ^{1} French Land Register data, which excludes lakes, ponds, glaciers > 1 km^{2} (0.386 sq mi or 247 acres) and river estuaries.

Neuville-sur-Saône (French pronunciation: [nøvil syʁ son], literally Neuville on Saône) is a commune in the Metropolis of Lyon in Auvergne-Rhône-Alpes region in eastern France.

== Surrounding communes ==
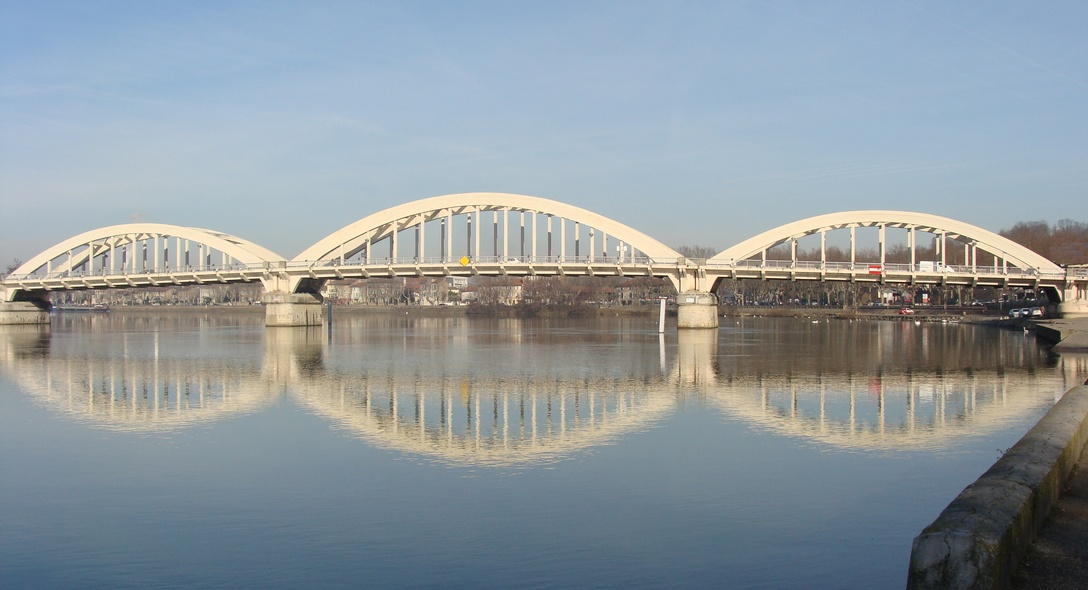
The Neuville bridge crossing the Saône

- Genay
- Montanay
- Fleurieu-sur-Saône
- Albigny-sur-Saône

== Population ==
Historical population
Year	Pop.	±% p.a.
1968	5,413	—
1975	5,663	+0.65%
1982	6,982	+3.04%
1990	6,762	−0.40%
1999	7,062	+0.48%
2007	7,127	+0.11%
2012	7,204	+0.22%
2017	7,514	+0.85%
2023	7,812	+0.65%
Source: INSEE

== Notable people ==
- Émile Guimet, industrialist, benefactor of the commune
- Camille de Neufville de Villeroy, archbishop of Lyon
- Gabriel Voisin, plane and car makers

== Gallery ==
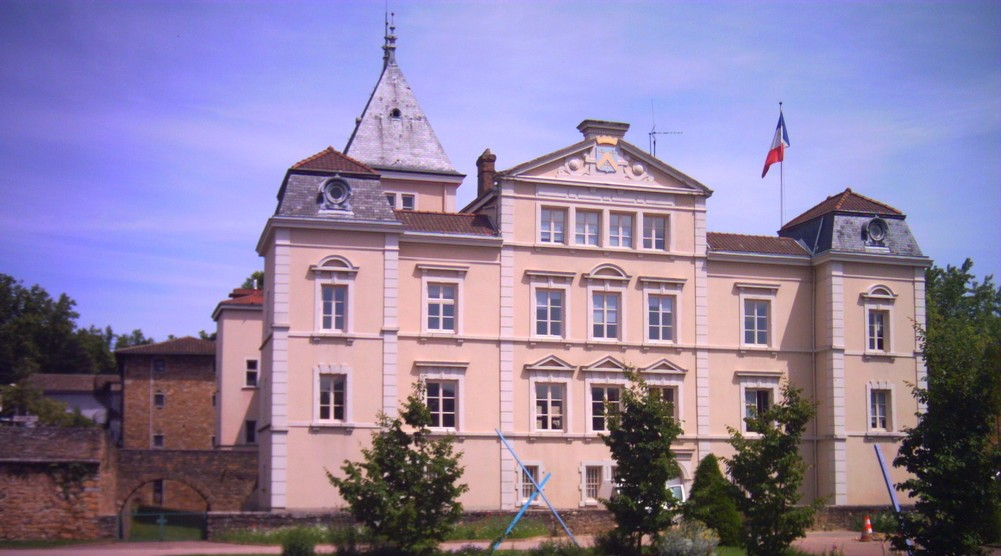
The Ombreval castle, Neuville town hall (west façade)

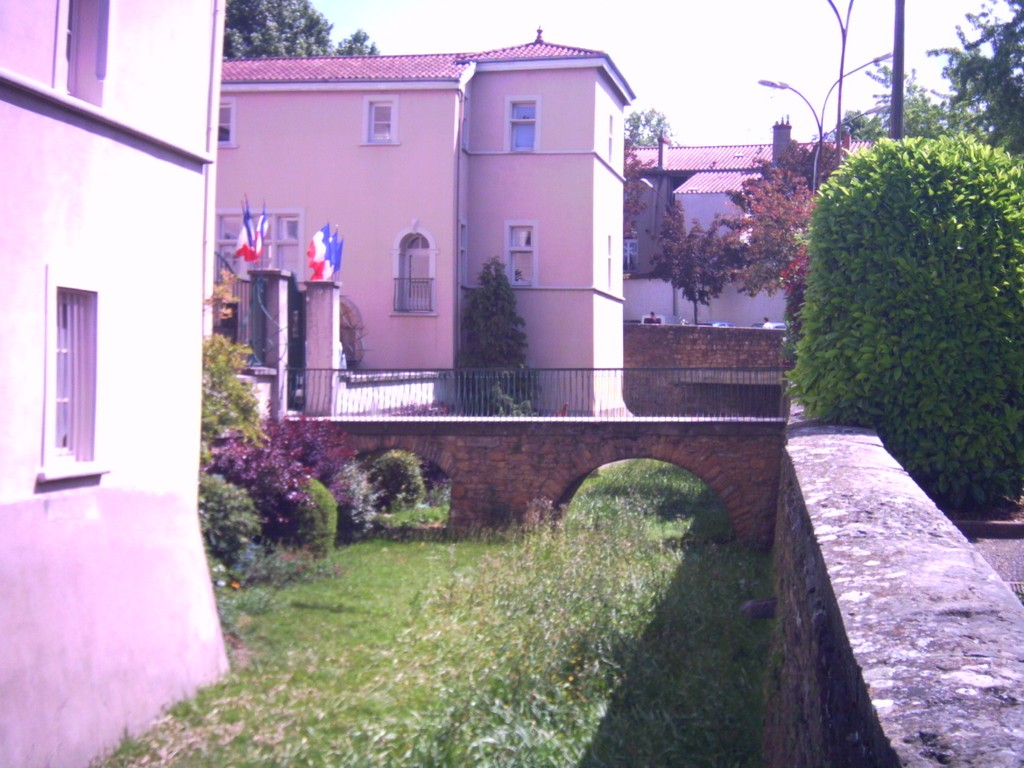
The moat of the castle, south side

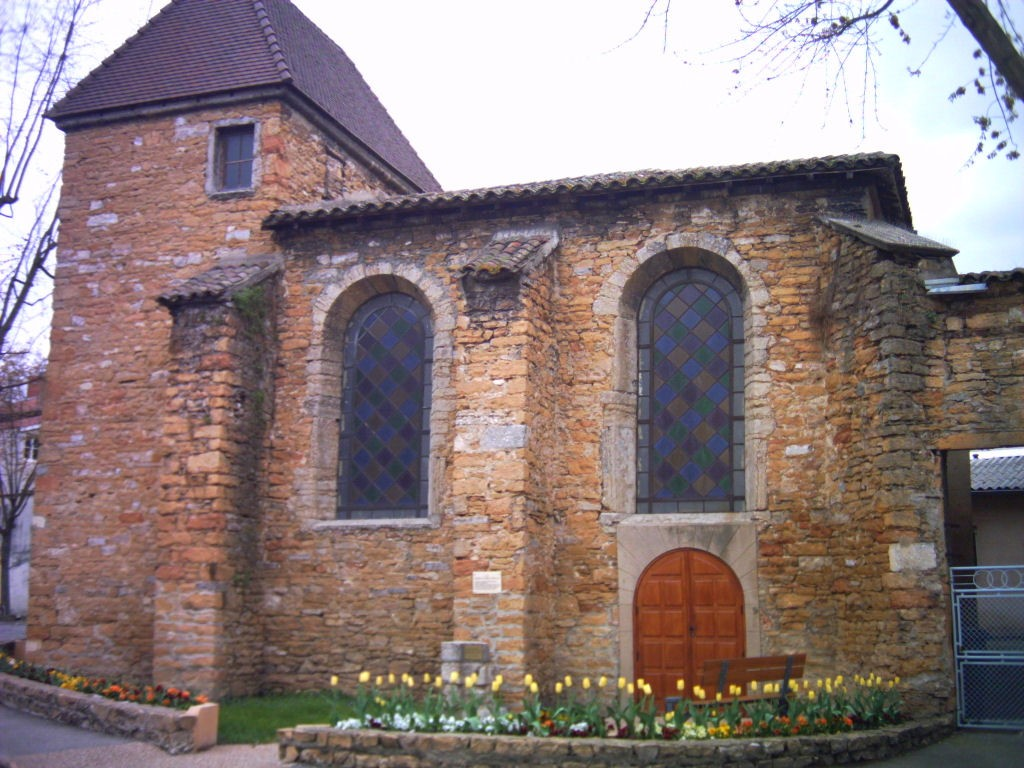
The chapel of the castle

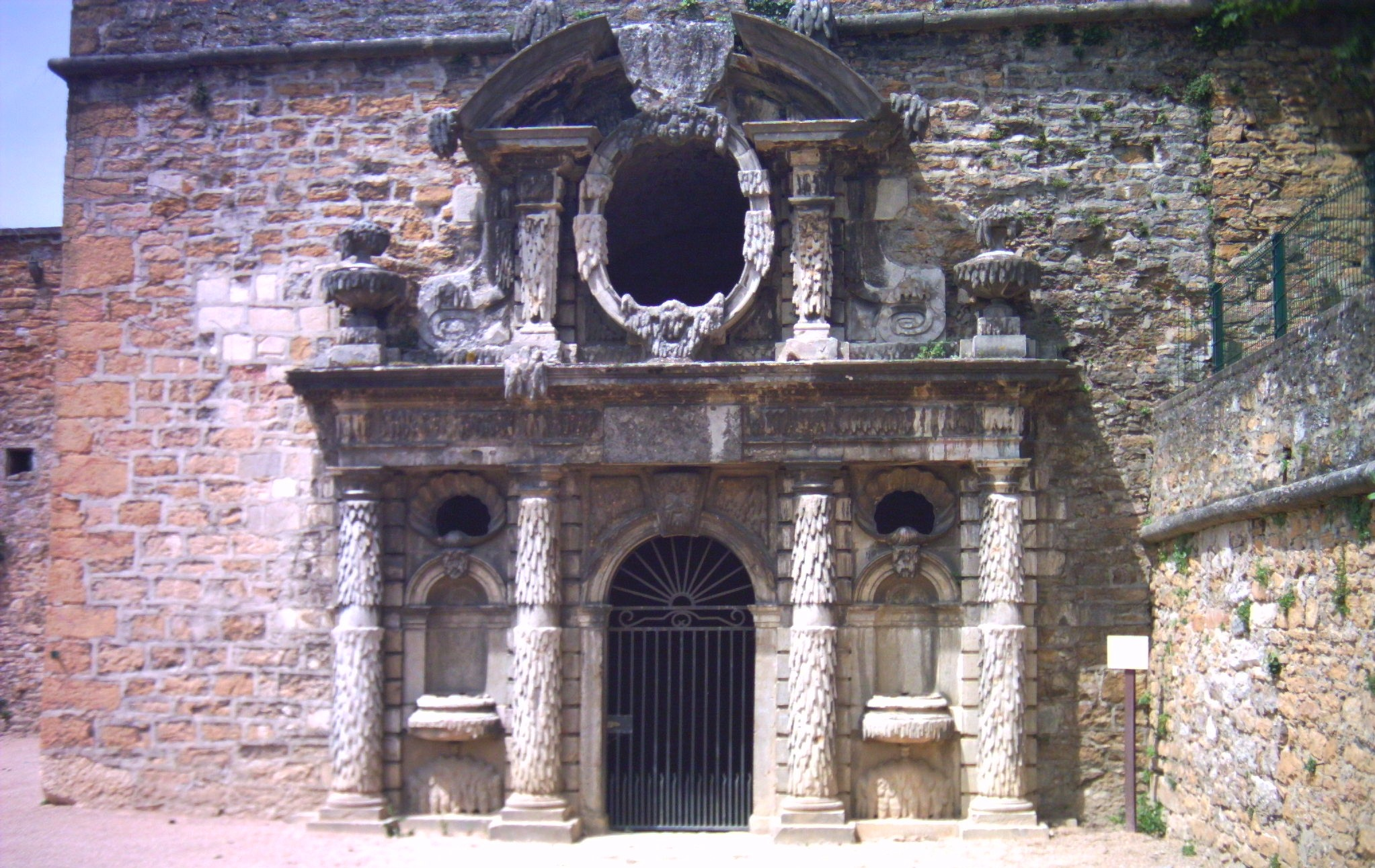
The Nymphaeum near the castle

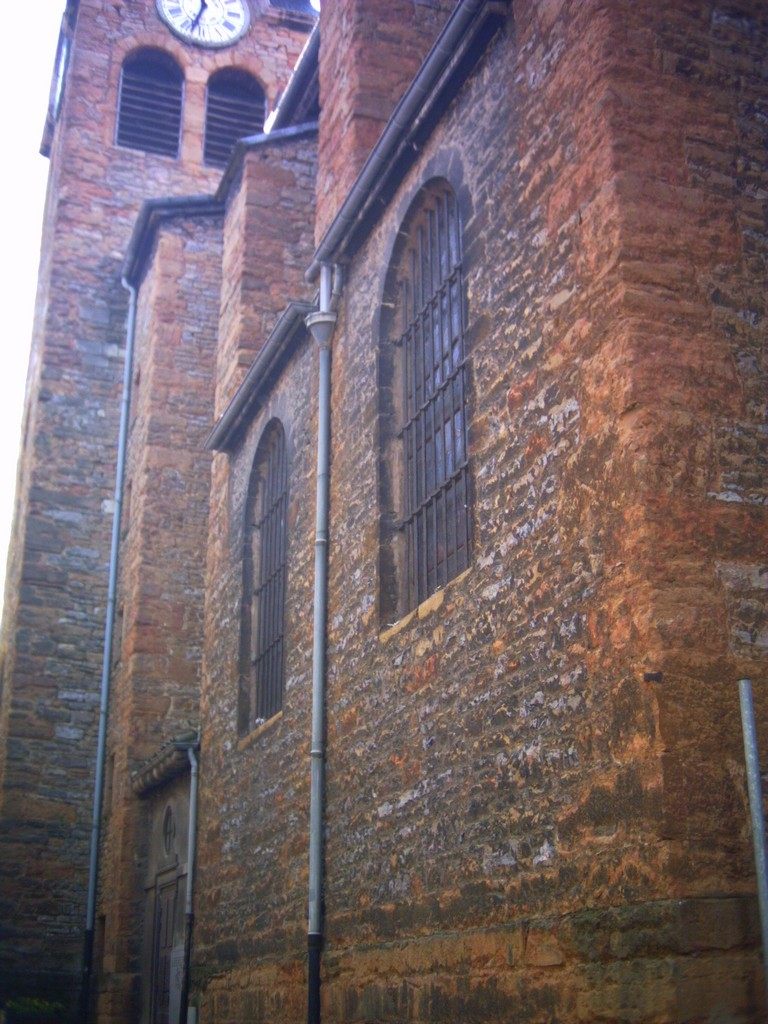
The church, south side

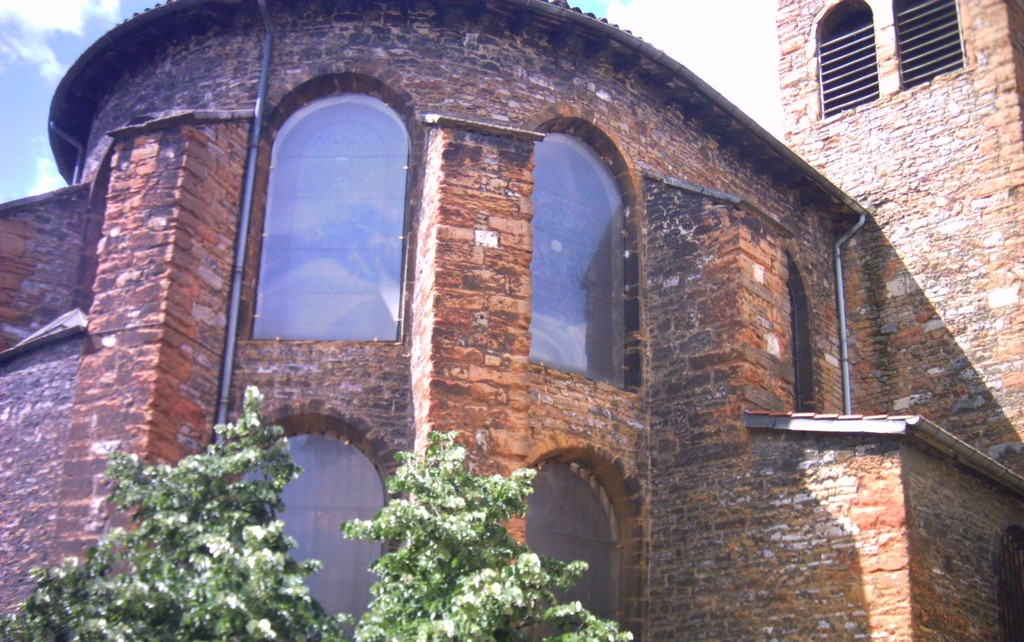
The church chevet

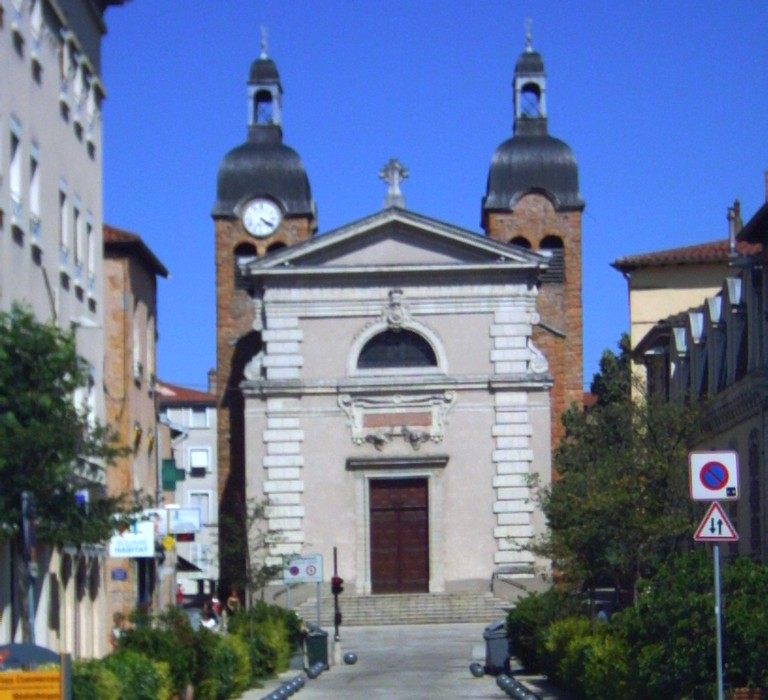
The church façade (19th century)

== See also ==
- Communes of the Metropolis of Lyon
