= François Paul de Neufville de Villeroy =

French Catholic archbishop

- Archbishop of Lyon
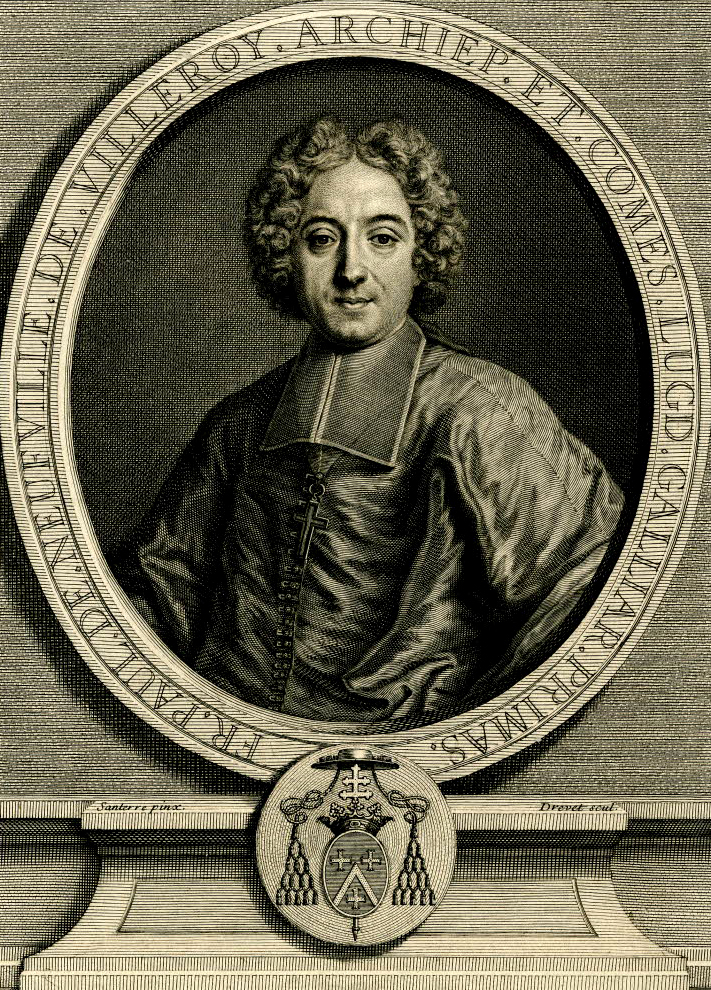
- Born: 15 September 1677; Versailles, France
- Died: 6 February 1731; Lyon, France
- Father: François de Neufville, duc de Villeroy
- Mother: Marguerite Marie de Cossé

François Paul de Neufville de Villeroy (1677–1731) was archbishop of Lyon from 15 August 1714 to 6 February 1731. He was a member of the Neufville de Villeroy family.
