= Charles Thomas, Prince of Vaudémont =

Charles Thomas de Lorraine
- Prince de Vaudémont, Prince of Commercy
- Born: 7 March 1670
- Died: 12 May 1704 (aged 34); Ostiglia, Italy
- House: Lorraine
- Father: Charles Henri, Prince of Commercy
- Mother: Anne Élisabeth de Lorraine

Charles Thomas de Lorraine (7 March 1670 – 12 May 1704), prince de Vaudémont, was a field marshal in the Austrian army. By birth, he was member of the House of Lorraine.

== Early life ==
Charles Thomas was the only son of Charles Henri of Lorraine, prince of Vaudémont and Commercy and Anne Élisabeth de Lorraine, and a grandson of Charles IV, Duke of Lorraine. His father used the style of prince de Vaudémont, although he held no corresponding territory, until 1708 when he received the allodial territory of Commercy from Leopold, Duke of Lorraine. Henceforth, the father reigned there as the Prince of Commercy, while Charles Thomas was styled the prince de Vaudémont.

== Biography ==
Like his forefathers he served in the Habsburg army against France. He made a brilliant career and in 1700 he was made a knight in the Order of the Golden Fleece.

He fought in Italy during the War of Spanish Succession under command of Prince Eugene of Savoy. He distinguished himself in the Battle of Cremona and Battle of Luzzara, and was made Fieldmarshal together with Guido Starhemberg in February 1704.

He was fatally wounded in a minor battle on 8 May 1704 near Ostiglia, and died 4 days later. He had no children.
