= Neufville de Villeroy family =

D'azur au chevron d'or accompagné de trois croisettes ancrées du même.

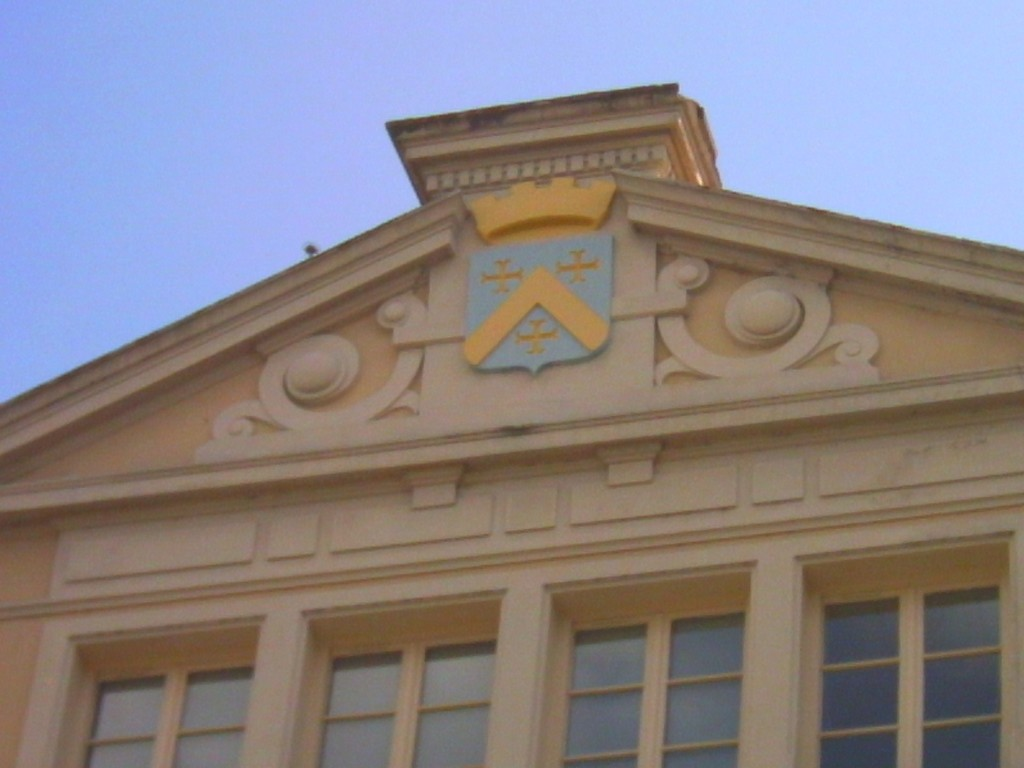
The Neufville de Villeroy arms on the château d'Ombreval, now the mairie of Neuville-sur-Saône (Rhône)

The Neufville de Villeroy family was a French noble family, the most notable member of which was François de Neufville, duc de Villeroi. It was descended from a finance minister to Louis XII.

== Arms ==
Its arms are "d'azur au chevron d'or accompagné de trois croisettes ancrées du même".

== Titles ==
It held two main duchies, that of Villeroy (peerage rank) and Alincourt (non-peerage rank). It also acquired the duchies and titles of Beaupréau and Retz (1716). Before becoming duke of Villeroy in title, Louis François Anne de Neufville de Villeroy called himself "Duke of Retz", a purely courtesy title.

=== Duke of Villeroy ===
The title duke of Villeroy was created in September 1651 for Nicolas V de Villeroy. He was raised to the peerage of France in 1663.

1. 1651–1685 : Nicolas V de Neufville de Villeroy (1597–1685), 1st duke of Villeroy. Marshal of France, named governor by Louis XIV in 1646.
2. 1685–1730 : François de Neufville de Villeroy (1644–1730), 2nd duke of Villeroy, son of the former, marshal, governor under Louis XV.
3. 1730–1734 : Louis Nicolas de Neufville de Villeroy (1663–1734), 3rd duke of Villeroy, son of the former.
4. 1734–1766 : Louis François Anne de Neufville de Villeroy (1695–1766), 4th duke of Villeroy, son of the former.
5. 1766–1794 : Gabriel Louis François de Neufville de Villeroy (1731–1794), 5th and last duke of Villeroy, nephew of the former.

=== Duke of Alincourt ===
The title duke of Alincourt was created on 20 September 1729 for François Camille de Neufville de Villeroy, younger son of Louis Nicolas de Neufville de Villeroy.

1. 1729–1732 : François Camille de Neufville de Villeroy (†1732).
2. 1732–1794 : Gabriel Louis François de Neufville de Villeroy (1731–1794).

== Other notable family members ==
- Camille de Neufville de Villeroy (1606–1693), archbishop of Lyon.
- François Paul de Neufville de Villeroy (1677–1731), archbishop of Lyon.
