= Camille de Neufville de Villeroy =

French Catholic archbishop

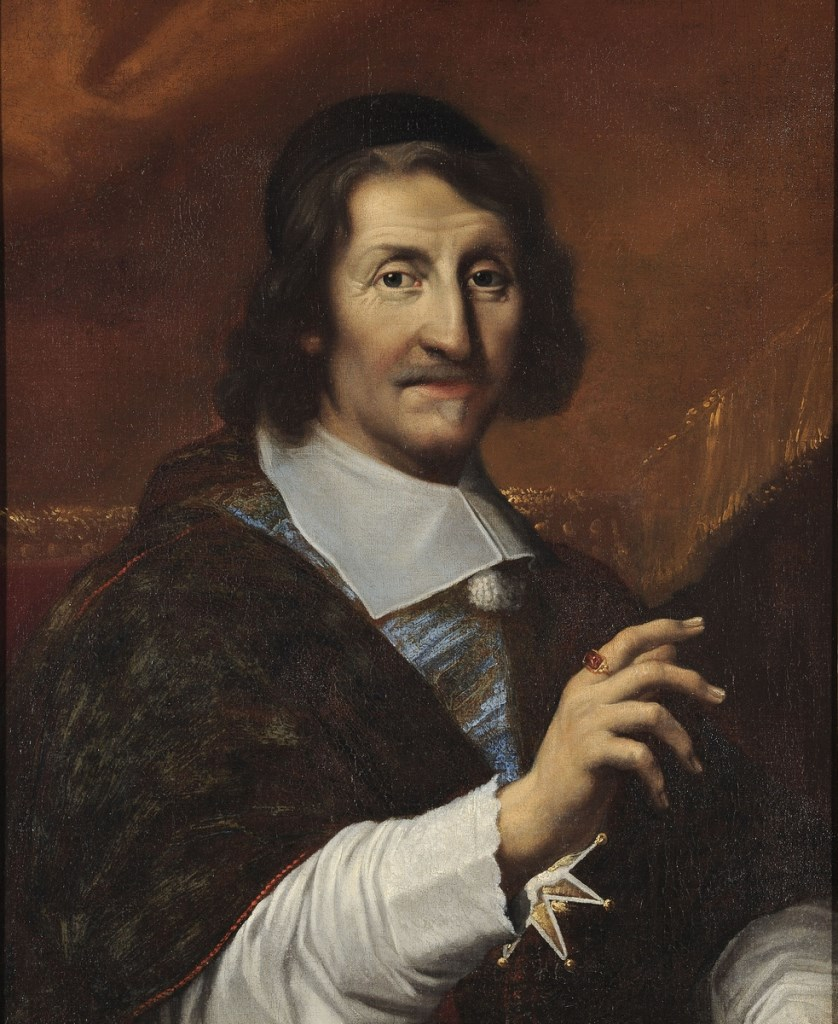
Portrait of Camille de Neufville de Villeroy by Thomas Blanchet (circa 1670)

Camille de Neufville de Villeroy (22 August 1606, Rome - 3 June 1693, Lyon) was the archbishop and count of Lyon and primate of the Gauls from 1653 to 1693. He was the second of five sons of Charles I de Neufville de Villeroy, marquis d'Halincourt, and grandson of Nicolas IV de Neufville de Villeroy, minister to the kings of France. He owes his Christian name to Camillo Borghese, pope under the name Paul V.
