= François de Neufville, 2nd Duke of Villeroy =

French Royal Army officer and nobleman

François de Neufville
- 2nd Duke of Villeroy
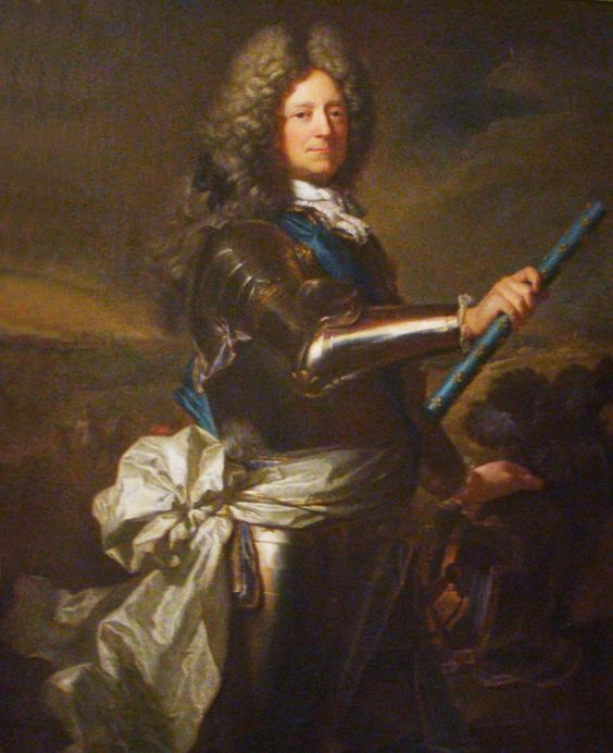
- Portrait by Hyacinthe Rigaud, 17th century
- Full name: François de Neufville
- Born: 7 April 1644; Lyon, Lyonnais, Kingdom of France
- Died: 18 July 1730 (aged 86); Hôtel de Villeroy, Paris, France
- Spouse: Marguerite Marie de Cossé (28 March 1662)
- Issue: Louis Nicolas de Neufville Camille de Neufville Francois Paul de Neufville François Catherine de Neufville Madeleine Thérèse de Neufville Françoise Madeleine de Neufville Catherine Anne de Neufville
- Father: Nicolas de Neufville, Marquis of Villeroy
- Mother: Madeleine de Blanchefort
- Military career
- Allegiance: Kingdom of France
- Rank: Marshal of France
- Wars: Franco-Dutch War; Battle of Saint-Denis; Nine Years' War; Battle of Landen; Bombardment of Brussels; War of the Spanish Succession; Battle of Chiari; Battle of Cremona (POW); Passage of the Lines of Brabant; Battle of Ramillies
- Awards: Order of the Holy Spirit; Order of Saint Michael

François de Neufville, 2nd Duke of Villeroy (7 April 1644 – 18 July 1730) was a French Royal Army officer and nobleman. He was involved in a number of military losses such as the Siege of Namur (1695), the Battle of Chiari in 1701, and the Battle of Ramillies in 1706. He was also responsible for the Bombardment of Brussels in 1695.

He was head of the royal Council of Finances and ministre of State under Louis XIV (1714), then head of the Conseil de finances and a member of the Regency council (1715), and head of the Council of Commerce (1716). As an obstacle to the policies of the Regent and cardinal Dubois, he was exiled to Lyon from 1722 to 1724.

== Biography ==
=== Family and early life ===
Villeroy was born in Lyon into noble family which had risen into prominence in the reign of Charles IX (1560 - 1574). His father Nicolas V de Neufville, Marquis of Villeroy, Marshal of France (1598–1685) was governor of the young King Louis XIV who later made him a duke.

François was brought up in close relations with Louis XIV and became a member of his inner circle. As a young child, he played with the King and his younger brother the Prince Philippe in the Palais Royal (home of Louis XIV and his mother Anne of Austria) and the nearby Hôtel de Villeroy (the home of the young François de Villeroy and his father the governor Nicolas V de Villeroy, the historic Hôtel de Villeroy is a 500 m walk from the Palais-Royal on 34 rue des Bourdonnais or 9 rue des Déchargeurs). Even though Francois de Villeroy was six years younger than Louis XIV, they were friends, probably because the young Louis XIV enjoyed the role of protector to a younger child.

=== Career ===
In 1693, he was made Marshal of France. In 1695, when François-Henri de Montmorency, duc de Luxembourg died, he obtained the command of the army in Flanders (see War of the Grand Alliance). Villeroy was responsible for the bombardment of Brussels in 1695, which occasioned its reconstruction in the 18th century.

In 1701, Villeroy was sent to Italy to supersede Nicolas Catinat and was beaten by the army of Prince Eugene of Savoy at the Battle of Chiari (see War of the Spanish Succession). In February 1702 he was made prisoner at the Battle of Cremona.

=== Against Marlborough ===
In the following years he was pitted against John Churchill, 1st Duke of Marlborough in the Low Countries. Marlborough's own difficulties with the Dutch and other allied commissioners, rather than Villeroy's own skill, put off the inevitable disaster for some years, but in 1706 Marlborough attacked him and thoroughly defeated him at the Battle of Ramillies.

=== After Ramillies ===
Louis consoled his old friend with this remark: "At our age, one is no longer lucky". However, Louis superseded Villeroy in the command, and Villeroy lived the life of a courtier and, although suspected of being involved in plots, maintained his friendship with Louis. During this time, his secretary was Pierre-François Godard de Beauchamps.

Under the Régence Villeroy was governor of the child King Louis XV and held several other high posts between 1717 and 1722, when he fell in disgrace for plotting against Philippe d'Orléans, Duke of Orléans, Regent of France (regent for Louis XV) and was sent to be governor of Lyon, virtually in exile. His family suffered a further disgrace when two younger members, the duc de Retz and the marquis d'Alincourt were exiled for having homosexual relations in the gardens at Versailles. Louis XV recalled Villeroy into high office when he came of age.

Villeroy died in Paris in 1730.

== Marriage and children ==
He married on 28 March 1662 with Marguerite Marie de Cossé (1648–1708), and had 7 children:

1. Louis Nicolas de Neufville (1663–1734), Duke of Villeroy, who married Marguerite Le Tellier, daughter of the Marquis of Louvois;
2. Camille de Neufville
3. François Paul de Neufville (1677–1731), Archbishop of Lyon (1714);
4. François Catherine de Neufville (died 1700);
5. Madeleine Thérèse de Neufville (1666–1723), a nun;
6. Françoise Madeleine de Neufville, married João de Sousa, 3rd Marquis of Minas;
7. Catherine Anne de Neufville (1674–1715), a nun;
