= Battle of Cremona =

1702 battle during the War of the Spanish Succession

Coordinates: 45.1333°N 10.0333°E

- Part of the War of the Spanish Succession
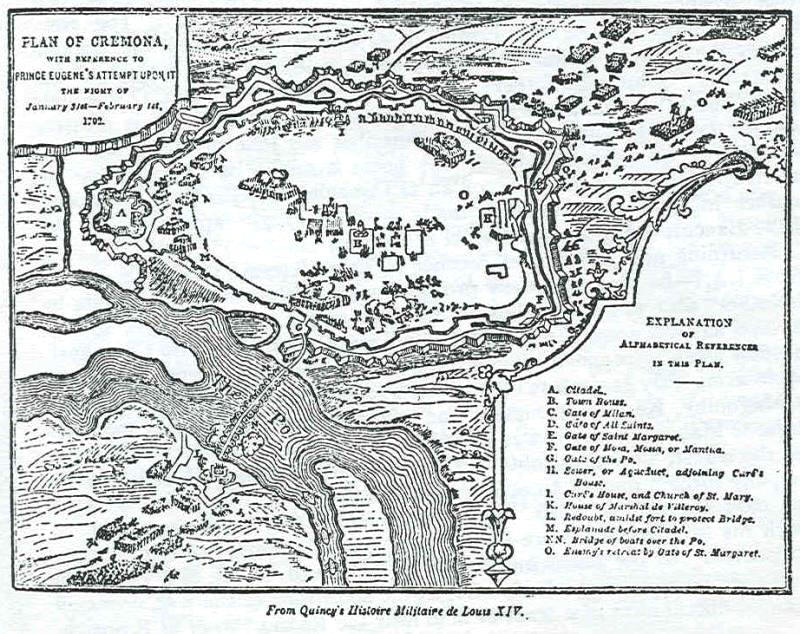
- Battle of Cremona
Date	1 February 1702
Location	Cremona, (present-day Italy)
Result	Inconclusive

Belligerents
Habsburg Monarchy (Denmark–Norway) Danish Auxiliary Corps	Kingdom of France

Commanders and leaders
Prince Eugene; Prince de Vaudémont	duc de Villeroi (POW)

Casualties and losses
800 killed and wounded 400 captured	1,200 killed and wounded 300 captured

The Battle of Cremona took place on the night of 31 January to 1 February 1702, during the War of the Spanish Succession, between a French force under Maréchal Villeroi and an Imperial/Austrian army led by Prince Eugene of Savoy.

== Background ==
The Duchies of Milan and Mantua were strategically important as the key to Southern Austria. The French took possession of both in early 1701 but Emperor Leopold then sent Prince Eugene to recapture them. He was an extremely capable general who easily out manoeuvred his French counterparts, winning battles at Carpi and Chieri, after which his army took up winter quarters in the pro-French Duchy of Mantua. Lack of funds and supplies from Vienna meant Eugene had to improvise; since campaigning in the winter months was not usually done, he hoped to take the French by surprise.

== Battle ==
Eugene had a contact inside Cremona, a priest named Cuzzoli; on the night of 31 January 1702, he admitted a party of Imperial grenadiers by means of a hidden culvert and they seized control of the St Margaret Gate. Once open, approximately 4,000 troops led by Prince Eugene in person took the French by surprise, many being killed as they emerged from their barracks, and Maréchal Villeroi captured in his quarters.

A second and larger force under Prince de Vaudémont was intended to storm the Po gate and the Citadel but was late in arriving. This gave the garrison time to destroy a vital bridge and prepare, the assault being repulsed by two units of the Irish Brigade, the Régiment de Dillon and the Régiment de Bourke. The defenders now regrouped and counter-attacked; with daylight and a French relief force arriving, Prince Eugene ordered his troops to withdraw, the Austrians having suffered an estimated 1,600 casualties, the French around 1,100.

== Aftermath ==
The two Irish units lost an estimated 350 out of 600 men engaged; their commander Major Daniel O'Mahoney was later presented to Louis XIV and knighted by the Stuart exile James III. He went on to have a distinguished career, fighting in Spain and Sicily; he ended as a Lieutenant-General and died in Ocaña, Spain in 1714.

Villeroi was soon released but his capture commemorated in verse; Par la faveur de Bellone, et par un bonheur sans égal, nous avons conservé Crémone et perdu notre général. (By the favour of Bellone, and a happiness without equal, we saved Crémone and lost our general).

The battle was also commemorated as a march entitled 'The Battle of Cremona' later used in the Irish Brigade.
