= Coste =

Coste is a surname. Notable people with the surname include:

- Alexandre Coste (born 2003), illegitimate son of Albert II, Prince of Monaco, and Nicole Coste
- Anne-Lise Coste (born 1973), French painter
- Carlos Coste (born 1976), Venezuelan free-diver
- Charles Coste (1924–2025), French cyclist
- Chris Coste (born 1973), American baseball manager, former coach, former Major League Baseball catcher and author
- Christian Coste (born 1949), French former footballer
- Claudio Di Coste (born 1954), Italian volleyball player
- Elisabeth Coste (1748–1794), French cloth merchant and resistor
- Émile Coste (1862–1927), French fencer
- Eugene Coste (1859–1940), Canadian mining engineer
- Georges Coste (born 1944), French rugby union coach and former player
- Gérard Coste (born 1939), French diplomat and painter
- Iuliu Coste (1876–1967), Romanian attorney and politician
- Jean-Baptiste Coste (1777–1809), French painter
- Jean-François Coste (physician) (1741–1819) chief physician of the French expeditionary forces in the American Revolution
- Jean-François Coste (sailor) (fl. 1989), French sailor
- Joanne Koenig Coste an advocate for patients with Alzheimer's Disease
- Jorge Coste (footballer) (born 1988), Mexican footballer
- Jorge Coste (water polo) (born 1959), Mexican water polo player
- Jules Coste (1840–1910), French journalist and playwright
- Jules Costé (1828–1883), French lawyer and composer
- Louis de La Coste (1675–1750), French composer
- Louise Zoé Coste (1805–?), French painter, daughter of Jean-Baptiste Coste
- Melanie Coste (born 1976), French pornographic actress
- Michel Saloff Coste (born 1955), French artist and professor
- Napoléon Coste (1805–1883), French guitarist and composer
- Nicole Coste (born 1971), former flight attendant who had a son with Albert II, Prince of Monaco
- Numa Coste (1843–1907), French painter and journalist
- Pascal Coste (1787–1879), French architect
- Pascal Coste (politician) (born 1966), French politician
- Sharon Coste (born 1963), French soprano of Canadian origin

== See also ==
- Paul Coste-Floret (1911–1979), French politician
- Conservatoria delle Coste
- Coste Rocks Provincial Park
- Lacoste
- Saint-Paul-la-Coste
- Saint-Victor-la-Coste
