= Jorge Coste =

Jorge Coste can refer to:

- Jorge Coste (footballer) (born 1988), Mexican footballer
- Jorge Coste (water polo) (born 1959), Mexican water polo player
