= Georg Wilhelm Rauchenecker =

German composer, conductor, and violinist

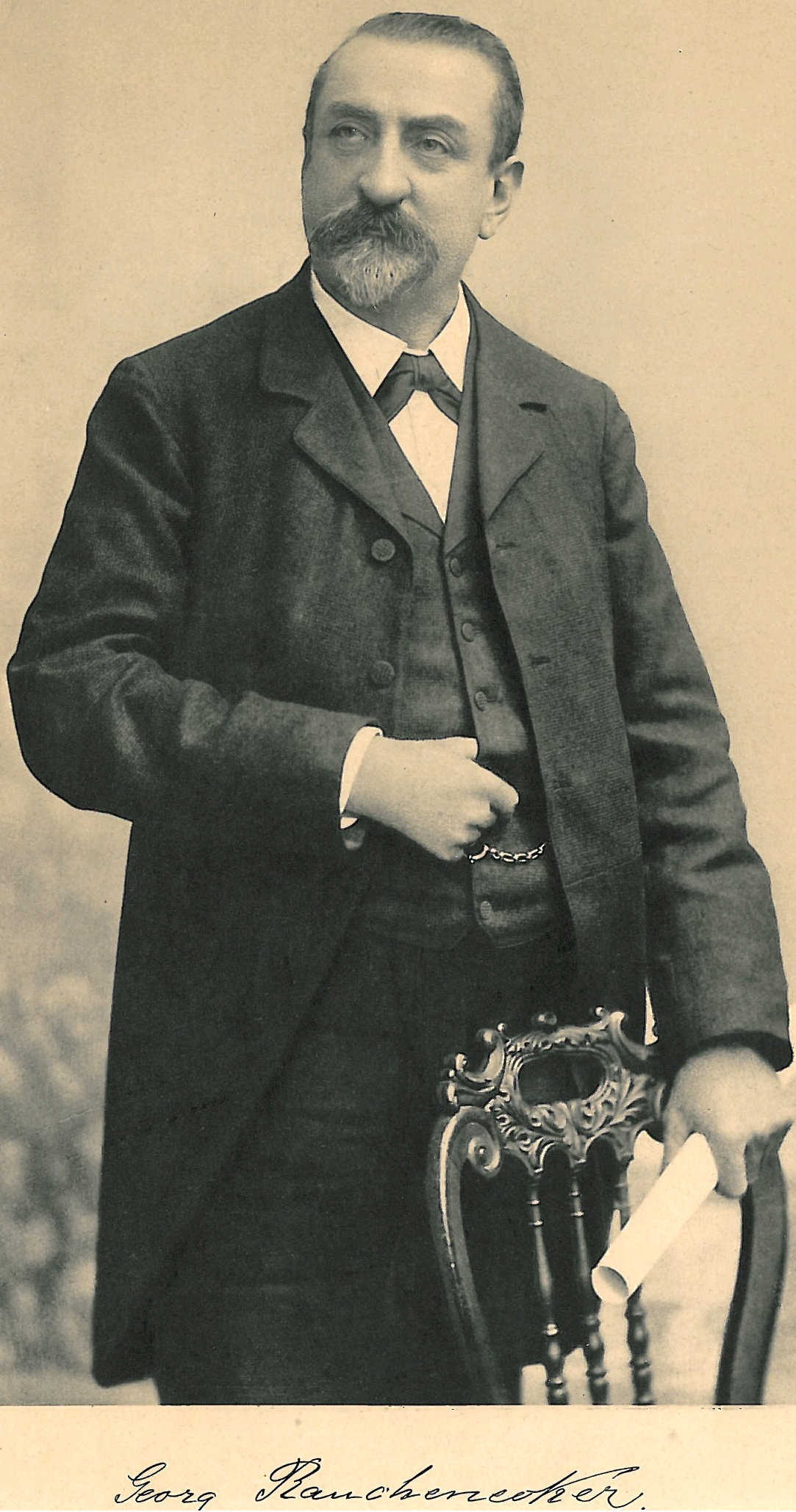
Georg Wilhelm Rauchenecker, around 1885

Georg Wilhelm Rauchenecker (8 March 1844, Munich – 17 July 1906, Elberfeld, today part of Wuppertal) was a German composer, conductor and violinist.

== Life ==
=== Childhood and youth (1844–1860) ===
Rauchenecker was born in Munich on 8 March 1844; he was the first child of Jakob Rauchenecker (1815–1876), an official musician of the city, and Rosina Crescenz Rauchenecker, née Wening (1815–1876) and was baptised a Catholic two days later at St Peter's in Munich. As a young boy he was sent by his father to his uncle, Georg Wening, who had been pastor of the parish of Thalheim (pop. 260) near Erding since 1855. It is possible that Rauchenecker was expected to follow the same career path as his uncle. After this he attended the King Maximilian Grammar School in Munich and here, at the age of eleven, he played first violin accompanying the church choir. Rauchenecker received comprehensive musical instruction in both piano and organ from Theodor Lachner (1798–1877), in the violin from Joseph Walter (1831–1875), in counterpoint from August Baumgartner (1814–1864) and in composition from Franz Lachner (1803–1890). From 1869 he himself gave violin, piano and organ lessons, as well as teaching harmony, counterpoint, fugue and the theory of musical form, and orchestration. Max Hieber, who later on was the concert master at Munich, was one of his pupils during this period.

=== French years (1860–1870) ===
On 1 August 1860 Rauchenecker received a passport to travel to France: initially he went and worked as first violin at the Grand Théâtre de Lyon. In 1862 he was appointed conductor in Aix-en-Provence and then in 1864 he took the post of chief conductor of the theatre orchestra in Carpentras. Here, in 1866, he married Elisabeth Antoinette Emilie Fournial (1842–1870), a lecturer. Their twins, Alban and Margarethe were born in Carpentras on 8 September 1867. In 1868 Rauchenecker accepted a position in Avignon as chief conductor of the opera orchestra and director of the conservatoire. After being expelled from France as a German citizen when the Franco-Prussian War broke out in 1870, he settled in Switzerland.

=== Swiss years (1870–1884) ===
Shortly after arriving in Zürich, his wife Elisabeth died: she was only 28 years old. Rauchenecker earned his living as a piano teacher and was also a member of the Tonhalle Orchestra in Zürich. He was introduced to Richard Wagner by his future brother-in-law, Oskar Kahl, the concertmaster of the Zürich City Orchestra. On 21 December 1870 the first rehearsals for the performance of "Siegfried Idyll" took place in the foyer of the Old Theatre in Zürich; the piece was subsequently given its first performance on the steps of the house at Tribschen near Lucerne on 25 December 1870, conducted by Richard Wagner – the occasion being his wife Cosima's birthday. Rauchenecker was one of the 15 musicians in the small orchestra. Not long after this, on 31 December 1870, a series of 7 quartet evenings began at the Wagners' house, with Oskar Kahl (1st violin), Georg Rauchenecker (2nd violin), Hans Richter (viola) und Hermann Ruhoff (cello) rehearsing string quartets by Beethoven.

In 1871, Rauchenecker was appointed director of music at Lenzburg where he was discovered by Dr. Jacob Heinrich Ziegler-Sulzer (1798–1882), a physician and musical patron from Winterthur.

In the spring of 1873 he converted to Protestantism as his second wife was a Protestant. The marriage to Anna Karolina Ulrica Kempin (1845–1904) took place at the Diaconal Church in Neuminster (Zürich).

On 29 October 1873 Rauchenecker, having been proposed by Ziegler-Sulzer, was elected to the post of head of music in Winterthur and, from the beginning of December 1873, he was also director of the School of Music there. In the ten years which followed he had a decisive influence upon the musical life of the city.

From 1873 to 1876 he conducted the men's choir called "Good Cheer" and in 1875 the Frauenfeld men's choir.

On 3 April 1876 Rauchenecker's father Jakob died in Winterthur; then, on 18 February 1877, his daughter Helene was born. In 1878 he took over the post of organist in the Reformed City Church from Julius Buckel. His daughter Elsa was born on 28 January 1880.

In 1880 Rauchenecker, together with U. Ruckstuhl, opened a music shop in Winterthur. When he left the city, his departure was marked by a concert given on 13 March 1884.

=== Berlin years (1884–1885) ===
On 30 March 1884 was the day Rauchenecker moved to Berlin to take up the conductorship of the Berlin Philharmonic Orchestra, then located in Bernburger Strasse in the district of Kreuzberg. He attained this position thanks to the extraordinarily favourable reception given to his Symphony in F minor which he had performed in Berlin in October 1883. He conducted his first symphony concert as early as 30 April that year. In addition, he worked as a piano teacher at the Stern Conservatoire and also took practices with small ensembles there.

=== Elberfeld years (1885–1906) ===
After a brief stay in Kassel, Rauchenecker moved to Barmen in the early summer of 1885. He then took over the Orchestral Society there, remaining until December 1887 when he became conductor of the Elberfeld Band (since 1929 the Wuppertal Band). In 1889 he founded a music school in Elberfeld. Among its students were the trombonist Joseph Franz Serafin Alschausky (1879–1948) and the composer Gustav Adolf Uthmann (1867–1920).

From 1892 to 1893 he conducted the men's choral society called "The German Singers' Circle". 1902 Rauchenecker was appointed "City Conductor".

His second wife, Anna, died in Elberfeld on 2 January 1904. In 1905 Rauchenecker was accorded the title of "Royal Prussian Director of Music".

Rauchenecker died of pneumonia in Elberfeld on 17 July 1906.

== Works ==
Rauchenecker composed numerous works in all musical genres:

=== Orchestral works ===
- La Serenade pour Orchestre (1857)
- Ouverture Souvenirs d'Aix (1863)
- Grand Ouverture pour Musique Militaire (1867)
- La Marseillaise pour Musique Militaire (1868)
- "Friedrich Rotbart" (ca. 1870), symphonic poem
- Symphony No. 1 in F minor (1875)
- Symphonic Composition in the Style of an Ouverture (1880)
- Symphony No. 2 in B♭ major "Triumphal" (1885)
- "Hochzeits-Idyll" (1889)
- Intermezzo from the opera "Sanna" (ca. 1893)
- "Aus der Jugendzeit" (ca. 1896), symphonic poem
- "Alarich auf der Akropolis" (ca. 1899/1900), symphonic poem
- Symphony No. 3 in D major "Elegiac" (1903/1904)

=== Concertos ===
- Violin Concerto No. 1 A minor (1876/1885)
- Violin Concerto No. 2 B minor (1900)
- Piano Concerto No. 1 B minor (1898)
- Piano Concerto No. 2 F minor (1894)
- Cello Concerto D minor (1904)
- Oboe Concerto H minor (1905)

=== Songs ===
- "Fünf Lieder der Brautzeit (Bräutigamslieder)" (1894) for baritone and piano
- "Sieben Lieder" after the novel Der Liedermacher (1894) for soprano and piano
- "Abendlied" (1896)
- "Maria Wiegenlied" (1898)
- "Wirtstöchterlein" (1898)
- "Schwing dich auf" (1900)
- "Ave verum corpus" (1903) for contralto, cello, harp and organ
- "So geht's" (ca. 1888) for voice and piano
- "Bergisches Lied" for baritone and piano
- "Drei Gesänge" for baritone
- "Fünf Lieder" (ca. 1883/84) for deep voice
- "Königsmordliche Ballade" (ca. 1874) with flute accompaniment

=== Choral works ===
- "Sechs Lieder" (1878) for mixed chorus
- "Zwei Särge" (1900) for mixed chorus and piano
- "Pharao" (1897) for four-part mixed chorus or three-part women's chorus and piano
- "Lied von der Glocke" for four-part mixed chorus with speaker and piano or three part women's chorus (ca. 1895)
- "Hymne zur Einweihung des Kaiser-Wilhelm- und des Kaiser-Friedrich-Denkmals in Elberfeld" (1883) for men's chorus
- "Deutsches Schwert und deutscher Sang" (1891) for four-part men's chorus
- "Gotenzug", op. 137 (1899) for four-part men's chorus with winds or piano
- "Gotentreue", op. 138 (1899) for men's chorus, soloists and orchestra (or piano)
- "Germania" (ca. 1896) for men's chorus
- "Sechs Lieder" for men's chorus
- "Schwert und Palme" for men's chorus
- "Baracher Wein" (ca. 1889) for four-part men's chorus
- "Chorlied der Deutschen in Amerika" (1885) for four-part men's chorus
- "Der Lenz ist da" (ca. 1890) for men's chorus
- "O du taufrischer Morgen" (1877) for men's chorus
- "Wie lieb ich dich" (1877) for men's chorus
- "Walther von der Vogelweide" (1899) for four-part men's chorus a cappella
- "Das heutige Vaterland" (1883) for men's chorus
- "Gruss der Heimat: Wo immer ich weile" (um 1888) for men's chorus
- "Die Schönheit der Natur" (1900) for four-part women's chorus
- "Im Abendrot" (1900) for four-part women's chorus
- "Geduld" (1900) for three-part women's chorus
- "Zur heiligen Nacht" (1900) for mixed and three-part women's chorus and piano
- "Vater unser" (1895) for three-part women's chorus with harmonium and flute
- "Weihnachtsgruss" (1898) for three-part women's chorus and piano
- "Ode an das 19. Jahrhundert" (1899)
- "An die Freiheit" (1891) for soloists, chorus and orchestra
- "Niklaus von der Flüe" (1874), Swiss Peace Cantata, for soloists, male chorus and orchestra
- "Trauerkantate auf den Tod Friedrichs III." (1888) for mixed chorus, baritone and orchestra
- "Meine Göttin" (1897), cantata for tenor, men's chorus and orchestra
- "Huldigung der schönen Künste" (1898), cantata for soloists, chorus and orchestra
- "Heil dir Germania", cantata for four-part mixed chorus, piano and orchestra and speaker
- "Hinaus auf hohen Bergesgipfel", (1889) festive cantata
- "Die Murtenschlacht", (1876) cantata for soloist, chorus and orchestra
- "Kaiser Otto I.", Kantate für Solo, dreistimmigen Frauchenchor und Klavier oder für Solo, gemischten Chor und Klavier
- "Borussia" (1899/1900), cantata for three-part women's chorus and piano or soloist, mixed chorus and piano
- "Durch Nacht zum Licht (per tenebras ad lucem)" (ca. 1900) oratorio for chorus, soloists and orchestra
- "Grosse Vokale Messe" (1863/64) for six-part chorus
- "Titanenschicksal" (1899)
- "Festgesang" (1877) for mixed chorus, soloists and orchestra

=== Stage works ===
- La graine de coquelicot (ca. 1863), opéra comique in 1 act
- Tristanderl und Süßholde (1865), parody
- Le florentin (1871), opera in 3 acts
- Adelheid von Burgund (1886), opera
- Die letzten Tage von Thule (ca. 1889), opera in 4 acts
- Sanna (1893), opera in 2 acts
- Ingo (1893), opera in 4 acts
- Don Quijote (1895), opera in 3 acts
- Der Florentiner (1901), opera in 3 acts (new version of "Le florentin")
- Ovid bei Hof, incidental music (after 1885)
- Theodor Körner, festival (1891)
- Amalasuntha, opera

=== Chamber music ===
- String Quartet No. 1 in C minor (1874)
- String Quartet No. 2 in D major (1878)
- String Quartet in A minor (ca. 1879)
- String Quartet in E major (ca. 1883)
- String Quartet in G minor (in the Form of a Suite) (ca. 1890)
- String Quartet in E♭ major
- Piano Quintet in D major (1897) for piano, flute, 2 violins, viola and cello
- String Sextet in E♭ major
- Wind Octet in B♭ major (1897) for flute, oboe, cor anglais, 2 horns, bass clarinet and bassoon

=== Works for solo instruments ===
- "6 Charakteristische Tonbilder", op. 24–29 (1873) for violin and piano
- "Orientalische Phantasie" (1874) for violin and string quartet or piano
- "Die vier Temperamente", 4 short pieces for piano
- "5 kleine Klavierstücke"
- "26 kleine Orgelpräludien" (ca. 1902/03)
- "Jesu, komm zu mir" for organ
- "Präludium für Harmonium" (after 1885)

== Honours ==
In 1905 Rauchenecker was given the title of Royal Prussian Director of Music.

== Discography (selection) ==
- String Quartett No. 1 (1874) (Jecklin, DDD, 95)

== Notes ==
=== Sources ===
- Anon. (1855). Jahres-Bericht über das k. Maximilians-Gymnasium in München für das Schuljahr 1854/55. Munich: königl. Central-Schulbücherverlag.
- Anon. (26 November 1857). "Volks-Theater in der Müllerstraße". Münchener Tages-Anzeiger.
- Anon. (18 January 1863). "Nouvelles diverses". Le Mémorial d'Aix; Anon. (10 May 1863). "Nouvelles diverses". Le Mémorial d'Aix.
- Anon. (8 September 1867). "Nouvelles diverses". Le Mémorial d'Aix.
- Anon. (1885). Zivilstandsamt Zürich – Bürgeretat der Stadt Zürich. Zürich: Friedrich Schultheß.
- Anon. (1890). Festschrift zum 40jährigen Bestehen des Stern'schen Konservatoriums.
- Anon. (1980). 150 Jahre Instrumental-Verein Wuppertal e.V. (commemorative publication). Haan: Wölfer-Druck-Verlag.
- Baker, Theodore (1900). A Biographical Dictionary of Musicians. New York: G. Schirmer.
- Clifford, John Herbert (1911). "Rauchenecker, Georg Wilhelm". The Musiclover's Handbook. New York: University Society.
- Fehr, Max (1939). "Georg Rauchenecker – ein Wagner-Pionier". Aus Wagners Leben und Schaffen. Bayreuth: Verlag der Hofbuchhandlung Georg Nierenheim.
- Fellerer, Karl Gustav (1966). "Rauchenecker, Georg Wilhelm". Beiträge zur Rheinischen Musikgeschichte. Cologne: Arno Volk-Verlag.
- Fritsch, E. W. (18 October 1883). "Tagesgeschichte. Musikbriefe. Berlin". Musikalisches Wochenblatt. Leipzig: Verlag von E. W. Fritzsch.
- Kempter, Lothar (1959). "Musikdirektor Georg Wilhelm Rauchenecker". Das Musikkollegium Winterthur. Vol. 2. Verlag des Musikkollegiums, Winterthur.
- Knopf, Alfred Abraham (1945). The Life of Richard Wagner. Norwood, Massachusetts: Plimpton Press.
- Kurmann, Nicole (2004). "Dem Provinziellen widerstehen". Das Musikkollegium Winterthur 1629–2004 im Musikleben der Stadt. Zürich: Chronos. ISBN 978-3-0340-0673-6.
- Loewenberg, Alfred (1978). Annals of Opera 1597–1940. London: John Calder.
- Mason, Daniel Gregory (1915). The Art of Music. New York: The National Society of Music.
- Rauchenecker, Georg Wilhelm (1904). Überblick über meine Lehrtätigkeit (Autograph). Wuppertal, Germany: Municipal Archive.
- Rauchenecker, Herbert (1978). Raucheneck und Rauchenecker. Die Geschichte eines niederbayerischen Namens und der Träger dieses Namens. Ottobrunn.
- Refardt, Edgar (1928). "Rauchenecker, Georg Wilhelm". Historisch-Biographisches Musiker-Lexikon der Schweiz. Leipzig, Zürich: Gebrüder Hug & Co.
- Riemann, Hugo (1899). "Rauchenecker, Georg Wilhelm". Encyclopædic Dictionary of Music. Translated by J. S. Schedlock. Philadelphia: Theodore Presser Company; latest revised edition, to 1897.
- Schuh, Willi (1939). Schweizer Musikbuch. Zürich: Atlantis Verlag.
- Seitz, Robert (1883). Musikalisches Centralblatt. Leipzig: Verlag von Robert Seitz.
- Thompson, Oscar; Slonimsky, Nicolas; Sabin, Robert, eds. (1964). "Rauchenecker, Georg Wilhelm". The International Cyclopedia of Music and Musicians. New York: Dodd, Mead & Company.
- Vallas, Léon (29 December 1903). "Nouvelles Diverses". Revue musicale de Lyon.
- Weber, Karlheinz (March 1998). "Josef Serafin Alschausky (1879–1948)" (PDF). Das Schallstück. No. 1/1998. Internationale Posaunenvereinigung e.V. Archived from the original (PDF) on 17 January 2009.
