= Numa =

Numa or NUMA may refer to:

== Places ==
- Numa Falls, a waterfall in Kootenay National Park, Canada
- 15854 Numa, a main-belt asteroid

=== United States ===
- Numa, Indiana
- Numa, Iowa
- Numa, Oklahoma
- Numa Peak, a mountain in the Glacier National Park, Montana

== People ==
- Numa Andoire (1908–1994), French football defender and manager
- Numa Ayrinhac (1881–1951), Franco-Argentine artist
- Numa Coste (1843–1907), French painter and journalist.
- Numa Denis Fustel de Coulanges (1830–1889), French historian
- Numa Droz (1844–1899), Swiss politician
- Numa Edward Hartog (1846–1871), British academic and activist
- Numa F. Montet (1892–1985), American politician
- Numa François Gillet (fl. 1868–1935), French painter
- Numa Lavanchy (born 1993), Swiss football midfielder
- Numa Marcius, first Pontifex Maximus of Ancient Rome
- Numa Morikazu (1843–1890), Meiji era Japanese politician
- Numa Pompilio Llona (1832–1907), Ecuadorian poet, journalist, educator, diplomat, and philosopher
- Numa Pompilius (753–673 BC), second king of Rome
- Numa S. Trivas (fl. 1899–1949), Russian-American art historian and collector
- Numa Sadoul (born 1947), French writer, actor, and director
- Daiki Numa (沼 大希; born 1997), Japanese footballer
- Mauro Numa (born 1961), Italian fencer
- Shosaku Numa (1929–1992), Japanese neuroscientist
- Numa Turcatti (1947–1972), Uruguayan law student.

== Other uses ==
- Non-uniform memory access (NUMA), in computing
- National Underwater and Marine Agency, an organization in the United States (namesake of a fictional US government organization in novels by Clive Cussler)
- Northern Paiute people, who call themselves Numa
- Numa, a performing lion who was raised at Gay's Lion Farm in El Monte, California, US
- Numa (1811 ship), English whaling, transport, and merchant ship
- Cyclone Numa, a Mediterranean tropical-like cyclone in November 2017, which had subtropical characteristics

== See also ==
- Numa Numa (disambiguation)
- Nuclear mitotic apparatus protein 1, encoded by the NUMA1 gene
