= Ensamble Speculum Amoris =

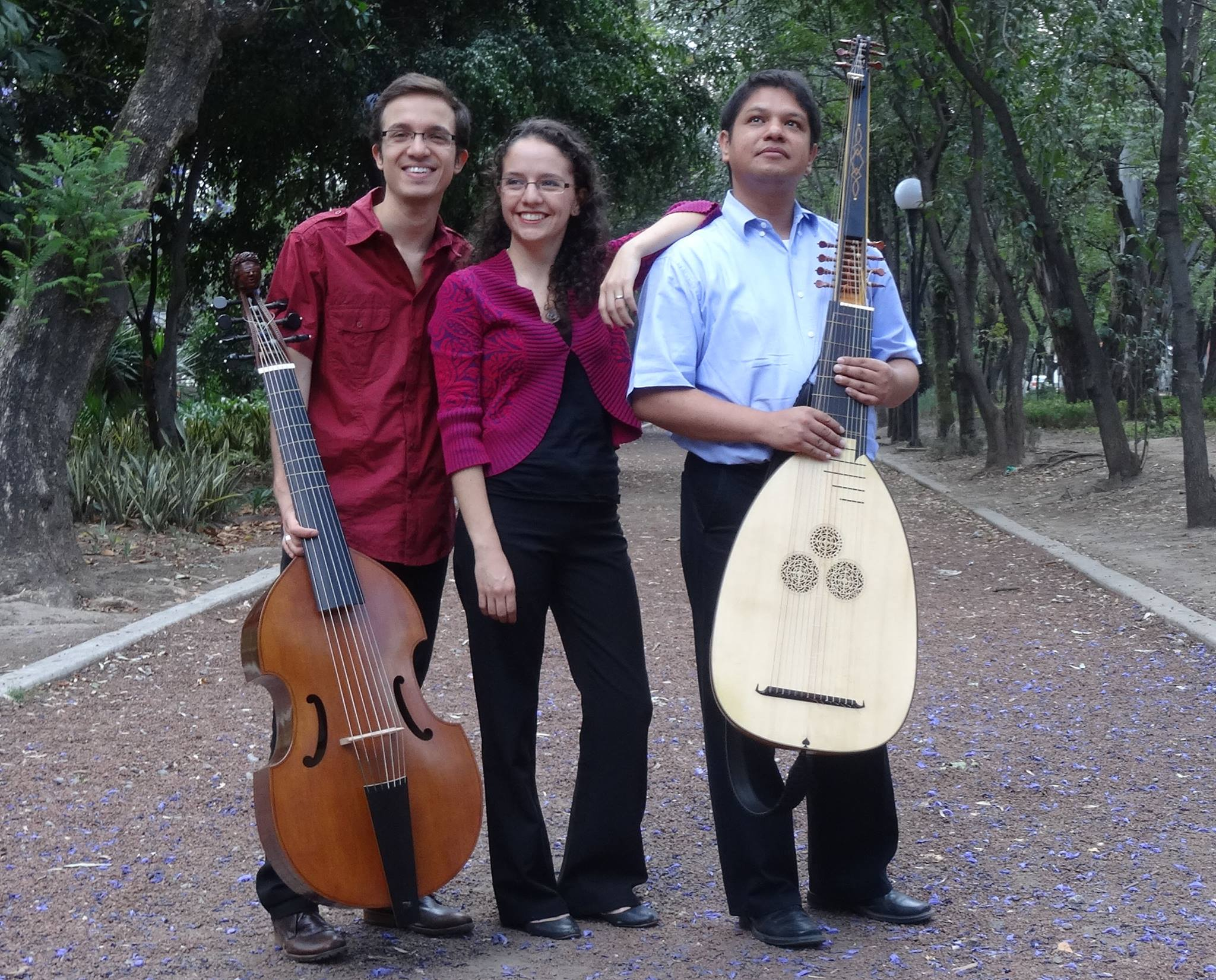

Background information
- Origin: Mexico
- Genres: Baroque and similar music
- Years active: 2012– (or –present)
- Website: www.speculum-amoris.com

Ensamble Speculum Amoris is an ensemble formed by Ileana Ortiz (soprano), Roberto González (theorbe and baroque guitar) and Rafael Sánchez Guevara (viola da gamba), dedicated to promoting Baroque and ancient music in Mexico. They have performed in various festivals in Mexico, such as the Festival Internacional Cervantino and the Festival Ágape, and all its members have performed in Mexico and abroad.

== Organization ==
Ensamble Speculum Amoris was founded in 2012 by Ileana Ortiz and Roberto González. With the aim of promoting this music in Mexico, the ensamble focuses on vocal and instrumental works from the 16th, 17th and 18th centuries, using replicas of instruments from the time. The recreation of the works involves research of the styles and the various methods of playing, in order to interpret the manuscripts from these centuries.

== Director ==
Ileana Ortiz is a soprano born in Mexico City in 1988. She first studied with Rita Guerrero, who introduced her to Baroque and Ancient music. She is now student of Claire Lefilliâtre, Guillemette Laurens and Sharon Coste (in Bordeaux Conservatory of Music). She has also worked with the specialists in plain chant and polyphony, Jean-Christophe Candau and Marcel Pérès. She divides her professional time between Mexico and France and, in collaboration with Vox Cantoris ensemble, she founded the New Spain Music Heritage Association (Asociación Patrimonio Musical de la Nueva España).

== Performances ==
The works performed by the group include music from the composers Giovanni Paolo Cima, Claudio Monteverdi, Henry Purcell, Alessandro Piccinini, Santiago de Murcia, Georg Friedrich Händel, Robert de Visée, Michel de la Barre, Marin Marais, Jean-Baptiste Lully and José Marín.

The ensemble has also performed on the radio in collaboration with the Instituto Mexicano de la Radio as well as in Festival Internacional Agape (2013) in Coahuila and the Festival Internacional Cervantino (2014).
