= Jean-Baptiste Coste =

French painter

Jean-Baptiste Coste (17 March 1746 - 20 October 1819) was a French painter and friend of Jacques-Louis David. His children included the painter Louise Zoé Coste.

== Bibliography ==
- Principes élémentaires de lavis et d'aquarelles (avec J. Marchand), s.l.n.d.

== Known works ==
=== Paintings ===
- Ideal landscape with the basilica of Maxentius, 1791 (Musée des Beaux-Arts d'Orléans – shown at the Entre Lumières et romantisme exhibition at the Musée Jenisch (Vevey), from 16 March to 17 June 2007.
- Roman Altar, with inscription, late 18th century, Musée Grobet-Labadié, at Marseille
- Park with architecture, late 18th century, Musée Grobet-Labadié, at Marseille
