= Joseph Desanat =

French Provençal poet and journal editor

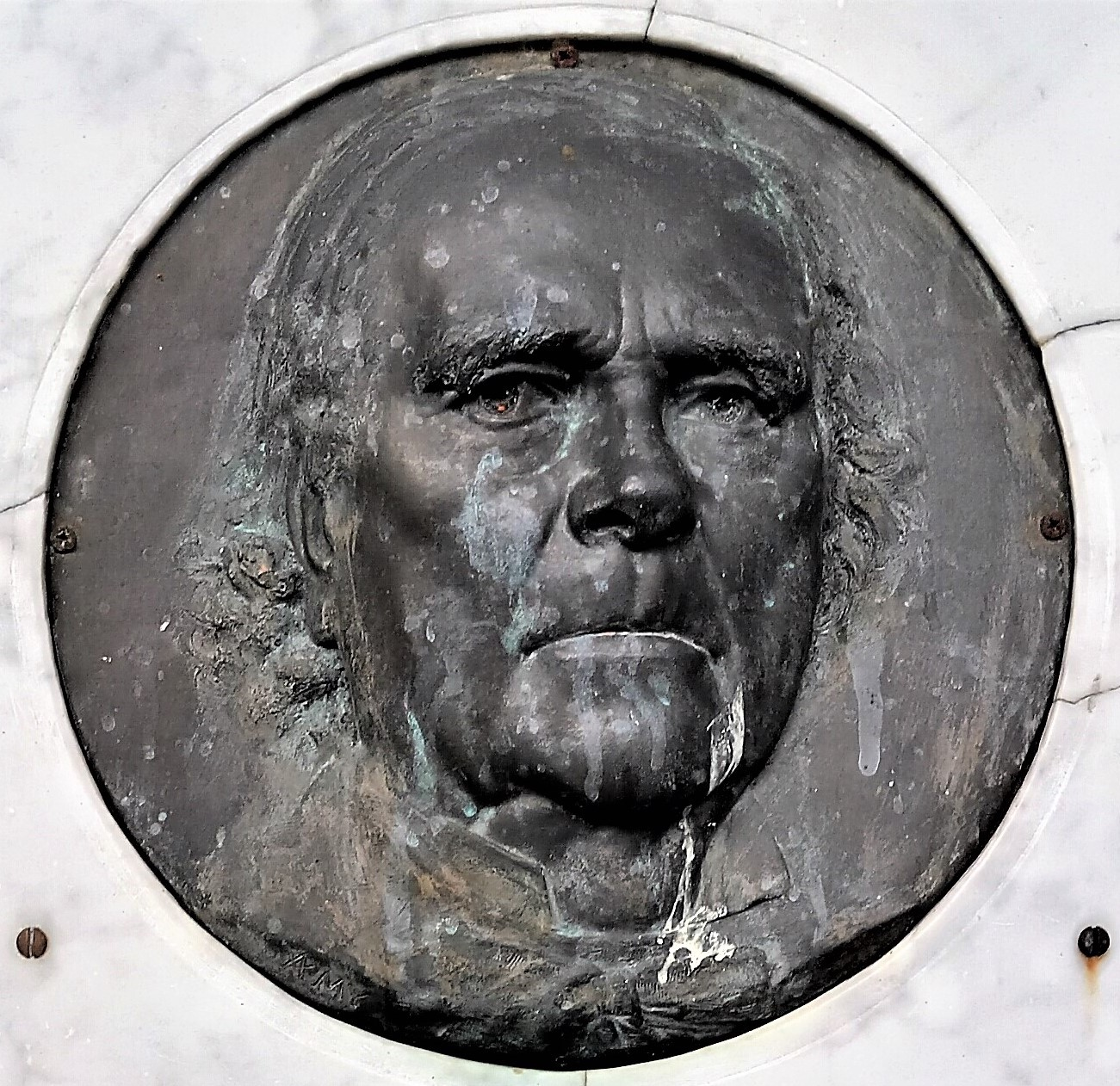
- Relief of Joseph Desanat by Jean Barnabé Amy in Jardin des Plantes (Tarascon)
- Born: 1796; Tarascon, Bouches-du-Rhône, Provence-Alpes-Côte d'Azur, France
- Died: 1873 (aged 76–77)
- Occupations: Poet, journal editor

Signature
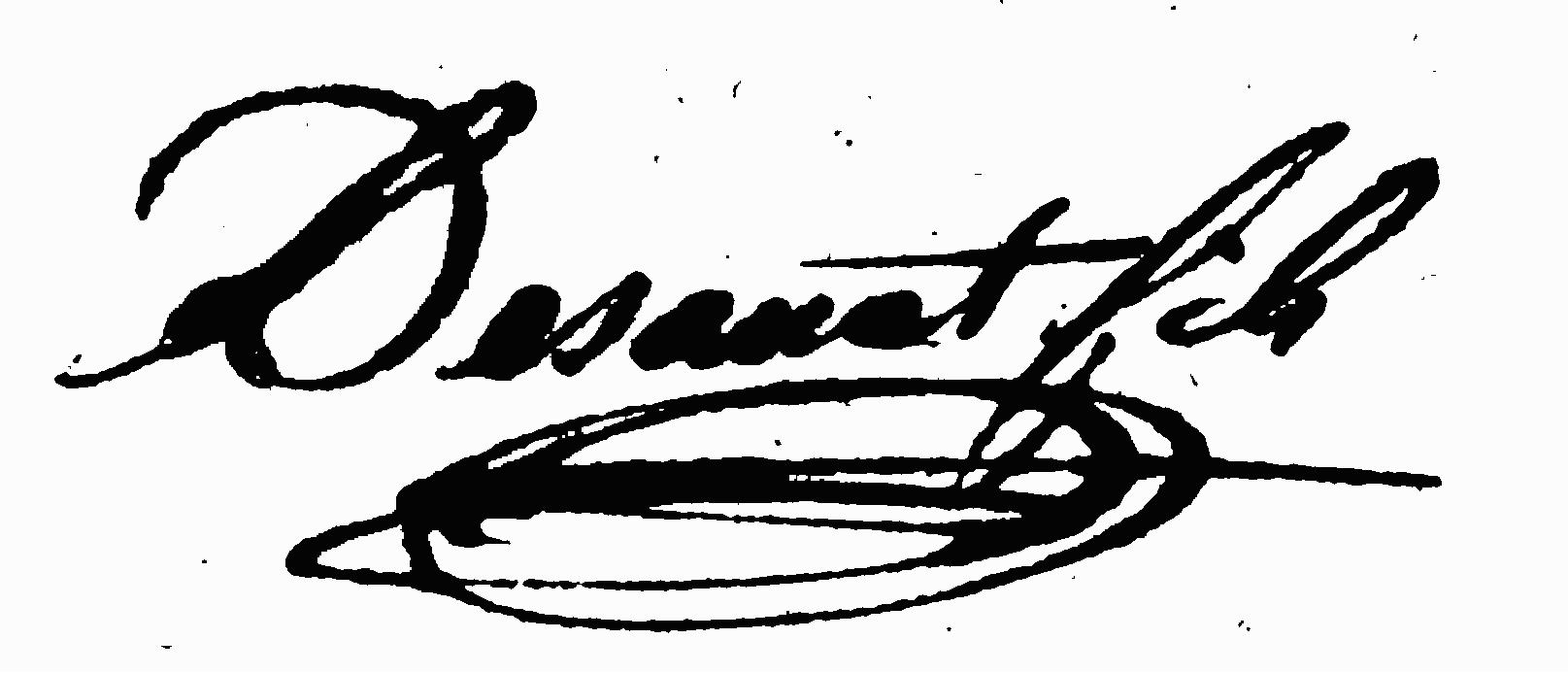

Joseph Desanat (1796 – 1873) was a French Provençal poet and journal editor.

== Early life ==
Joseph Desanat was born in 1796 in Tarascon.

== Career ==
Desanat was first a courtier. He then moved to Marseille, where he made charcuterie.

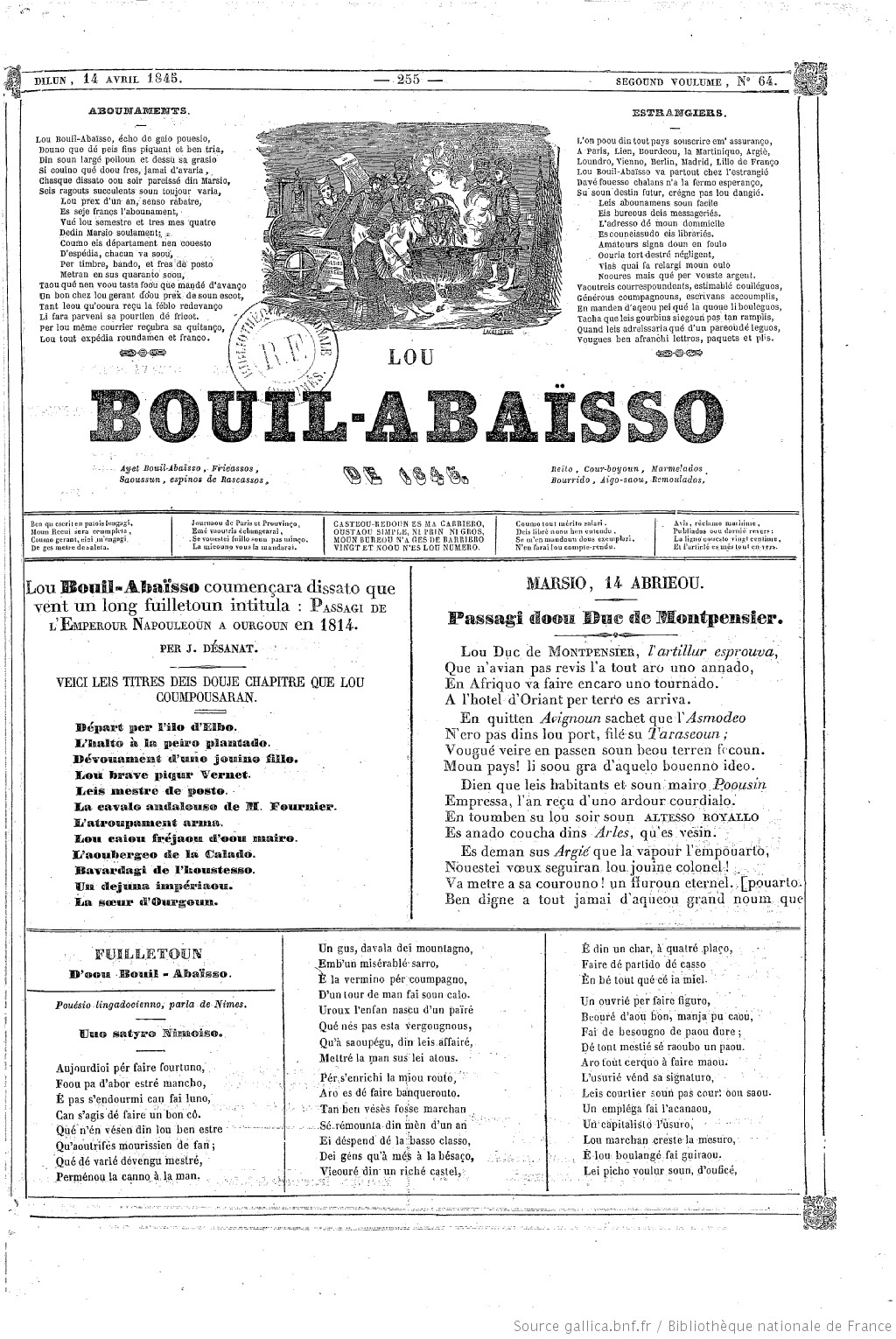
Frontpage of Lou Bouil-Abaïsso on 14 April 1845.

In 1841, Desanat founded Lou Bouil-Abaïsso, a literary journal of Provençal poetry published in Marseille. The journal ran from 1841 to 1842, and from 1844 to 1846. Desanat encouraged his friend Jean-Baptiste Gaut to submit poems, leading to a career as a poet and an advocacy of the Félibrige movement.

A Provençal poet himself, Desanat's use of the language is remarkable as it predates Frédéric Mistral's spelling rules.

== Death ==
He died in 1873.

== Legacy ==
The Boulevard Joseph Desanat in Tarascon was named in his honour.
