= Dardilly =

- Commune
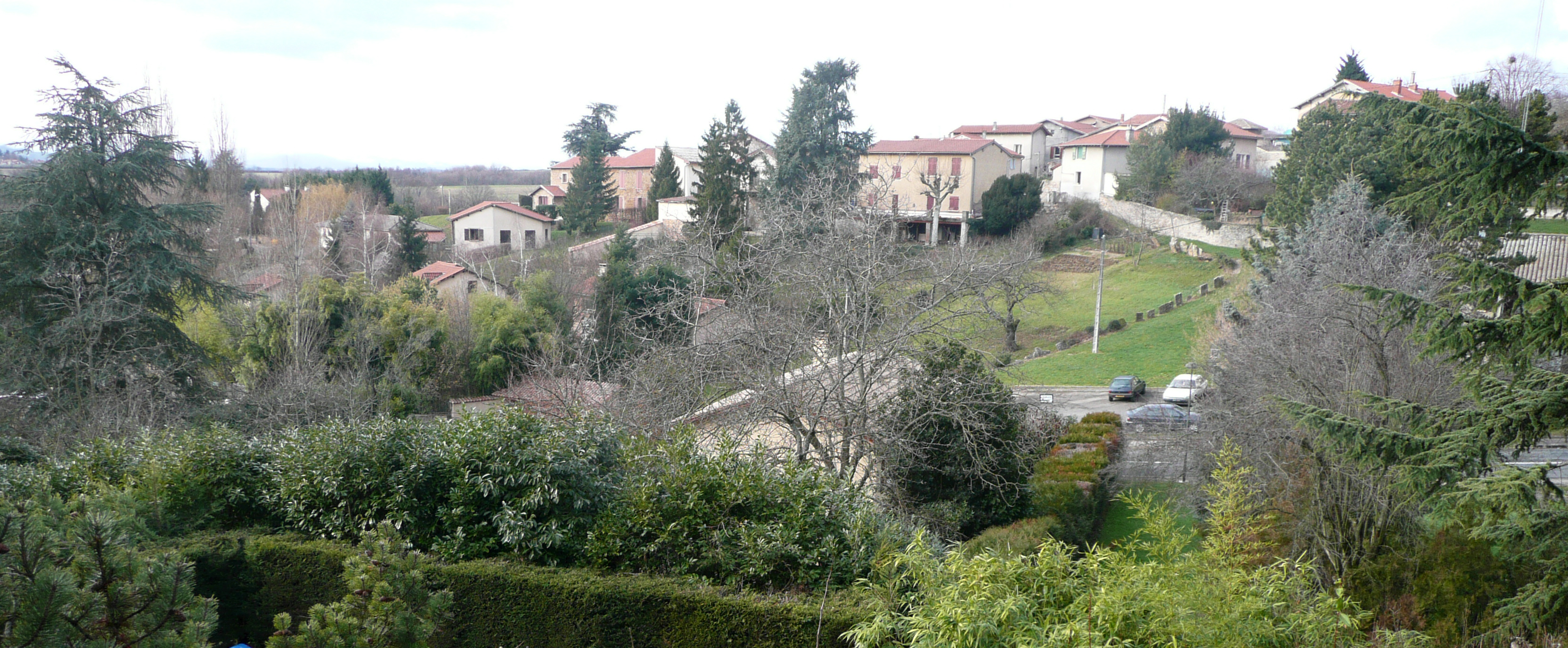
- A general view of Dardilly

- Coat of arms
- Location of Dardilly
- Location within France Location within Auvergne-Rhône-Alpes
- Coordinates: 45°48′23″N 4°45′13″E
- Country: France
- Region: Auvergne-Rhône-Alpes
- Metropolis: Lyon Metropolis
- Arrondissement: Lyon

Government
  - Mayor (2026–32): Patrice Crosnier (DVD)
- Area^{1}: 13.99 km^{2} (5.40 sq mi)
- Elevation: 348 m (1,142 ft)
- Highest elevation: 375 m (1,230 ft)
- Lowest elevation: 240 m (790 ft)
- Population (2023): 9,221
  - Density: 659.1/km^{2} (1,707/sq mi)
- Time zone: UTC+01:00 (CET)
  - Summer (DST): UTC+02:00 (CEST)
- INSEE/Postal code: 69072 /69570
- ^{1} French Land Register data, which excludes lakes, ponds, glaciers > 1 km^{2} (0.386 sq mi or 247 acres) and river estuaries.

Dardilly (French pronunciation: [daʁdiji]; Arpitan: Dardelyé) is a commune in the Metropolis of Lyon in Auvergne-Rhône-Alpes region in eastern France.

Its inhabitants are called Dardillois in French.

== Geography ==
An undulating town to in the western Lyonnais, Dardilly is crossed to the east by the A6 autoroute and the RN6 and to the west by the RN7. Marked by a greener and more rural lifestyle, Dardilly's center is only 20 minutes by car from the Lyons peninsula. (By TCL bus: lines 3, 89, and by train, from the Saint-Paul suburb, - Lozanne).

Dardilly, with its 13.99 km^{2} (5.40 sq mi), includes three valleys oriented north south: the valley of ruisseau de la Beffe to the west, the valley of the ruisseau des Planches and the valley of the ruisseau de Serres to the east. Its altitude varies between 260 and 390 metres, allowing exceptional views over the Monts d'Or, the Monts du Lyonnais and even on clear days the Alps, from Vercors to Mont Blanc.

The Town also possesses 1.73 km^{2} of leafy forests of ones and 6.46 km^{2} (2.49 sq mi) of farmland. Many paths for walkers, horseriders and mountain-bikers criss-cross these spaces:

- chemin du Bois de Serres (walkers' information centre)
- sentier de la Beffe
- chemin de la Thuillière
- sentier de Chantemerle
- chemin du Pont
- chemin des Saules

Bordering communes include:

- Champagne-au-Mont-d'Or
- Charbonnières-les-Bains
- Dommartin
- Ecully
- Limonest
- Lissieu
- La Tour-de-Salvagny

== History ==
The name Dardilly may originate from the Gallo-Roman name Dardiliacus, if the town was founded in that period, but there is no historic proof for this hypothesis, although the remains of an aqueduct built by Claudius to bring the waters of the Brévenne River (a tributary of the Azergues, itself a tributary of the Saône) to Lyon have been found nearby. More likely, the name Dardilly originated at the time of its first surviving mention, in the 10th century cartulary of Ainay Abbey, which possessed several lands here.

In the Middle Ages, the village, constructed on a mound, was made up of a church dedicated to Saint Pancras, an adjacent cemetery and about twenty houses. In 1210, at the time of the feudal wars, the Count of Beaujeu tried to seize the city of Lyon and its then archbishop, Renaud II de Forez, fortified Dardilly as part of his defence of Lyon by building a wall and ditch around the existing settlement.

In the time of Jean-Marie Vianney - the late 18th and early to middle 19th centuries - Dardilly was an agricultural and wine-growing town, with some beautiful houses built by wealthy people from Lyons who spent the summer months here. The population was about 1500 inhabitants. At the end of the 19th century the vines were ravaged by phylloxera and many of the town's inhabitants left for Lyons to find work, bringing the population down to 982 in 1911. The vine-growers that remained went over to growing fruit.

In 1986 Pope John-Paul II visited Dardilly to see Vianney's birthplace on the occasion of the bicentenary of his birth.

== Administration ==
=== List of mayors ===
From	Name	Party
October 2017	Rose France Fournillon	Independent
June 1995	Michèle Vullien	Independent
June 1990	Daniel Le Maire	RPR
March 1989	Bernard Thomas	Independent
March 1971	André Vialle	Independent
Holders before this date are unknown

== Demography ==
Historical population
Year	Pop.	±% p.a.
1968	2,010	—
1975	2,743	+4.54%
1982	4,668	+7.89%
1990	6,688	+4.60%
1999	7,589	+1.41%
2007	8,414	+1.30%
2012	8,519	+0.25%
2017	8,600	+0.19%
2023	9,221	+1.17%
Source: INSEE

The active population of Dardilly is 3546. Out of the employed residents of the commune, 25.6% work in Dardilly, 17.4% work in another TECHLID (Technopole économique de l'Ouest Lyonnais - Technopolis of West Lyonnais) commune, 52.3% work in another (non-TECHLID) commune within the département and 4.7% work outside the département.

== Economic ==
- Dardilly is made up of two principal and nearby commercial centres, one around the church of Saint Jean-Marie Vianney (Dardilly-le-Bas, or Lower Dardilly), the other around the church of Saint Claude (Upper Dardilly, Dardilly-le-Haut). Some trades are also present along the avenue de Verdun. The tourist complex of Porte de Lyon, along the A6, includes many hotels and restaurants as well as a disco. Porte de Lyon also has an Auchan shopping center.
- Dardilly belongs to the economic area west of Greater Lyon called TECHLID, made up of 7 towns (La Tour-de-Salvagny, Écully, Champagne-au-Mont-d'Or, Limonest, Dardilly, Tassin-la-Demi-Lune, Charbonnières-les-Bains). In 2003, TECHLID included 5284 businesses, of which 896 were within Dardilly. This is mainly the three PME/PMI (small and medium industries and businesses), because 68.7% entreprises in TECHLID have less than 2 employees. The activity of the businesses in Dardilly is divided up as follows:

Distribution by sector
Primary	Secondary	Tertiary	Unknown
3.2 %	13.2%	82.4%	1.2%

- The agricultural sector is also important, with 9 businesses growing wine, apples, and berries.

== Social ==
Dardilly has several social action groups :

- The CCAS (Centre communal d'action sociale, or community social action centre)
- A "Maison de la Petite Enfance", or nursery school
- A retirement home "La Bretonnière"
- A CAT - Ateliers Denis Cordonnier (social and employment centres for the handicapped)
- many associations such as the Association de service à domicile (home care group), the families association, Dardilly AVF Acceuil, etc.

=== Residences ===
The town had 1,700 buildings in 1982, compared to 2 821 buildings in 2005. Even though the town's buildings have remained very residential, with a majority being individually owned houses, many of its buildings are social housing.

== Environment ==
- Dardilly participates in recycling by obliging its inhabitants to sort their waste into two distinct dustbins.
- The waste collection site of Champagne-au-Mont-d'Or is open to the Dardillois.
- The town participates in the composting drive launched by Greater Lyon: every home is reimbursed 30 € on purchase of a composter.

== Schools ==
- 3 nursery and primary schools - the groupe scolaire Grégoire-Parsonge, the groupe scolaire des Noyeraies and the Saint-Joseph private school.
- Dardilly is attached to the Jean-Philippe Rameau college at Champagne-au-Mont-d'Or.
- Dardilly is attached to the Jean Perrin lycée and the La Martinière lycée, both in Lyon.
- Dardilly has several vocational training schools - the CFA Philibert de L'Orme (construction), the Institut de formation du bâtiment et des travaux publics (Institute for construction training and public works), the François Rabelais hotel-training school, and a lycée of the landscape and environment.

== Culture ==
- The Aqueduc, a cultural centre, contains a médiathèque, a ludothèque, a "salle de spectacle" or exhibition hall (which hosts a cinema club) and several rooms for societies. Exhibitions regularly occur in its hall.
- Dardilly has more than 35 associations in all areas : sport, music, theatre, arts, travel, twinning, etc.
- "Les Vendredis Baroques" (Baroque Fridays) is an annual festival of baroque music, held in June in the church of Sant-Claude.

== People ==
- Jean Vianney (1786–1859)
- Jules Coste (1840–1910)
- Laurent Bonnevay (1870-1957) also stayed near here.
- Rose Dione (1878-1936)

== Religion ==
The 2 churches, Saint Jean-Marie Vianney et Saint Claude, make up the catholic parish of Dardilly.

== Sights and monuments ==
- The Parsonnage manor
- Sant Jean-Marie Vianney church
- Saint Claude church
- the Bois de Serres
- Vianney's birthplace
- The oratory of Jean Marie Vianney
- The anti-war monument to the dead, inscribed "Contre la guerre et ses victimes la fraternité des peuples" (the brotherhood of peoples, against war and its victims), is one of France's Pacifist monuments to the dead.
- The Paillet fort

== Sport ==
About twenty sports associations and some businesses (e.g. a dance school) give a variety of sports opportunities in Dardilly. The town also has access to several sports facilities:

- The moulin Carron complex (gym, stadium, dojo, tennis), rebuilt and enlarged in 2007 *The Brocardière stadium (soccer pitch and athletics track)
- The Roland Guillaud gymnasium (climbing walls)
- The Paillet boulodrome
- The départemental boulodrome: situated in the Porte de Lyon, this large complex was inaugurated officially on 4 and 5 December 2006. At the crossroads for more than twenty years, the départemental boulodrome has thus left the south gate to be reborn at the Porte de Lyon. Installed on nearly 7 000 m², this complex includes more than 4,500 m² (covered and open-air) dedicated to games, of which 1,083 is air-conditioned, as well as a bar, a restaurant and a terrace. Ten games areas are up to international standard and allow the organization of competitions at the highest level.
- The Brocardière BMX track.

== Twin towns ==
- Merzhausen (Germany) since 1982
- Chorleywood (England)
- Edbaye El Hejaj (Mauritania) since 1987
- Provaglio d'Iseo (Italy) since 2017
