= Numa Numa (disambiguation) =

"Numa Numa" is an Internet meme based on a video by American vlogger Gary Brolsma.

Numa Numa may also refer to:

- "Dragostea din tei", the song in the Numa Numa video
- Numa Numa Trail, a trail on Bougainville in Papua New Guinea

== See also ==
- Numa (disambiguation)
