= Jean-Baptiste Gaut =

French Provençal poet and playwright

- Born: 2 April 1819; Aix-en-Provence, France
- Died: 14 July 1891 (aged 72); Aix-en-Provence, France
- Occupations: Poet, newspaper editor, library director
- Spouse: Marie-Nathalie Simon
- Children: 1 son, 2 daughters
- Parent(s): Jean-Joseph Gaut; Marguerite-Bastienne Berthon

Jean-Baptiste Gaut (1819–1891) was a French Provençal poet and playwright from Aix-en-Provence. He was a chief advocate of the Provençal language and the Félibrige movement. He was known as "Félibre Gaut."

== Early life ==
Jean-Baptiste Gaut was born on 2 April 1819 in Aix-en-Provence, France. His father, Jean-Joseph Gaut, was an arquebus manufacturer. His mother, Marguerite Bastienne Berthon, was the daughter of armourer Jean Berthon.

== Career ==
Gaut was encouraged to write poetry in Provençal by a friend, Joseph Desanat. He first wrote poetry for Lou Bouil-Abaïsso, a literary journal started by Desanat. In 1852, Gaut was a co-author in a collection of poems in Provençal with Joseph Roumanille. That same year, they organised a conference to promote Provençal poetry in Arles, followed by a similar conference a year later, in 1853. Those conferences were the precursors to the Félibrige movement, founded in 1854 by Roumanille and Frédéric Mistral. Meanwhile, Gaut founded Le Gay-Saber, a Provençal literary review, which only published 17 issues. Later, he published poetry in Armana Prouvençau.

Beyond poetry, Gaut wrote two plays in Provençal. His first play, Lei Mourou, was performed in Forcalquier in 1875. He went on to write two opéra comiques, which were performed in Sorgues en 1881.

Gaut was active in Aix-en-Provence. He served as the editor-in-chief of Le Mémorial d'Aix, a bi-weekly newspaper in Aix. He served as the Director of the Bibliothèque Méjanes from 1878 to 1891.

== Personal life ==
Gaut married Marie-Nathalie Simon. They have three children: Jeanne-Marguerite Gaut (born 1861); Pauline Gaut (born 1866); and Jean Gaut (born 1871).

== Death ==
He died on 14 July 1891 in Aix-en-Provence.

== Legacy ==
- The Rue du Felibre Gaut in Aix-en-Provence is named in his honour.
- The Allée Jean-Baptiste Gaut in Sausset-les-Pins as well as the Rue Jean-Baptiste Gaut in Velaux are also named in his honour.

== Bibliography ==
=== Poetry ===
- Sounet, souneto e sounaio (poems, 1874).

=== Plays ===
- Lei Mourou (1875).
- La bèn-vengudo (1887).

=== Opera comique ===
- Lou mau d'amour (1881).
- Blanco-flour de Vau-Claro o L'amour enrabia (1881).
