= Numa Coste =

French painter and journalist

- Born: 31 August 1843; Aix-en-Provence, Bouches-du-Rhône, Provence-Alpes-Côte d'Azur, France
- Died: 10 June 1907 (aged 63); Aix-en-Provence, Bouches-du-Rhône, Provence-Alpes-Côte d'Azur, France
- Occupations: Painter, journalist

Numa Coste (31 August 1843 – 10 June 1907) was a French painter and journalist.

== Early life ==
Numa Coste was born on 31 August 1843 in Aix-en-Provence, in south-eastern France.

== Career ==
Coste started his career as a notary's clerk. He later served as a sergeant in the civil service.

After he received his inheritance, he became a painter of still lifes. In 1880, he co-founded L'Art Libre, an artistic publication, with Émile Zola, Étienne Dujardin-Beaumetz, Paul Alexis et Marius Roux. He stopped painting in 1885, and became the editor of Le Sémaphore, the oldest newspaper in Marseille, under the pseudonym of Pierre Tournel. He also wrote articles for Le Mémorial d'Aix.

== Death ==
He died on 10 June 1907 in Aix-en-Provence.
