= Michel Saloff Coste =

French academic

Michel Saloff Coste (born June 28, 1955) is an artist and contractor at the École des Hautes Études Commerciales, and co-founder of the Club of Budapest France, an international non-profit organisation dedicated to leading citizens into discussing complex global issues.

== Early life and education ==
Saloff Coste was born in Paris. During his childhood, he discovered the paintings of his grandfather Roger Chastel (professor in the Beaux-Arts of Paris). He studied philosophy in the University Paris VIII and followed the lessons of Gilles Deleuze. He attended École Nationale Supérieure des Beaux-Arts in the atelier of Gustave Singier. In 1970, he met Andy Warhol in New York. His photography can be categorised as of the pop art movement and is noted for coloring on a series of portraits of Deleuze and self-portraits.

== Work experience ==
Saloff Coste worked as a consultant in communication, strategy and management, and eventually became involved in more fundamental research on these topics. From 1985 to 1987 he directed a permanent multidisciplinary workshop at the Ministry of Research in France on the topic of societal change. In 1991, Saloff Coste joined Bossard Consultants, a leading European consulting firm, as head of R&D within the 'Bossard Institute', and in 1993 created his own research and consultancy firm MSC ET ASSOCIES (Management, Strategy, and Communication), which specialised in global governance, Information Society and sustainable development. He is a co-founder of "New Cap Invest", a venture capital company dedicated to promoting highly innovative companies.

== Research focus and contributions ==
Michel Saloff-Coste's research focuses on the paradigm shift within the information society that he defines as a 'Creation-Communication society'. He elaborated a structural grid which classifies the evolution of civilization in four waves: 'hunting & gathering', 'agriculture & breeding,' 'industry & commerce,' and 'creation & communication'. He then analysed the interaction between different 'reality fields'. Developing his framework further with Carine Dartiguepeyrou, they articulated together ten long-term visions of the future called 'horizons'. This collaborative work was set out in their co-authored book Les horizons du futur.

Following Coste's suggestion, the French executive committee of the Club of Budapest developed quarterly one-day seminars which explore the main ideas, places and people that were linked historically to the integral movement. The first day of those “inaugurals days” was dedicated to explaining in general the integral approach, the second day looked at the issue of the integration of the integral approach and philosophy in real life. The third day concerned itself with integral education, exploring the theoretical and practical epistemological question connected with the specificity of the wish to build an integral university. In the fourth day, integral thinking was applied to the analysis of the contemporary, sociological, economical and ecological crises, for which potential solutions were explored. The fifth day looked at sustainable development and what the integral approach can bring in terms of integral ecology, society and economy. The sixth day, continuing the cycle, was more connected with future studies and futurology. It was entitled “Civilization of the future and future of the civilizations”, underlining the necessity to think not only in terms of cultural unity but also of diversity.

The Integral University (Université Intégrale in French) in Paris, which is still in its development stages, follows this cycle of conferences. The idea is to organize one-day seminars on various themes in cooperation with speakers, theoreticians and practitioners. The use of the word integral puts a consistent emphasis on the common desire of being integral, and with this aim in view, the systemic and transdisciplinary approaches are also considered as part of the same quest for integrality.

== Films and videos ==
- I am just a cartoon, Production Centre Georges Pompidou, 1982
- Bazooka, Production EAG, 1983
- Séminaire de prospective en Californie, octobre 2003
- Le Père Ceyrac, reportage sur le Père Ceyrac, octobre 2004
- Le dirigeant du troisième millénaire, reportage séminaire à Sciences Po, juin 2005
- Abécédaire de Michel Saloff-Coste, décembre 2005
- Les enjeux du troisième millénaire, septembre 2007
- Première journée de l'Université intégrale, février 2008
- Deuxième journée de l'Université intégrale, octobre 2008

== Gallery ==
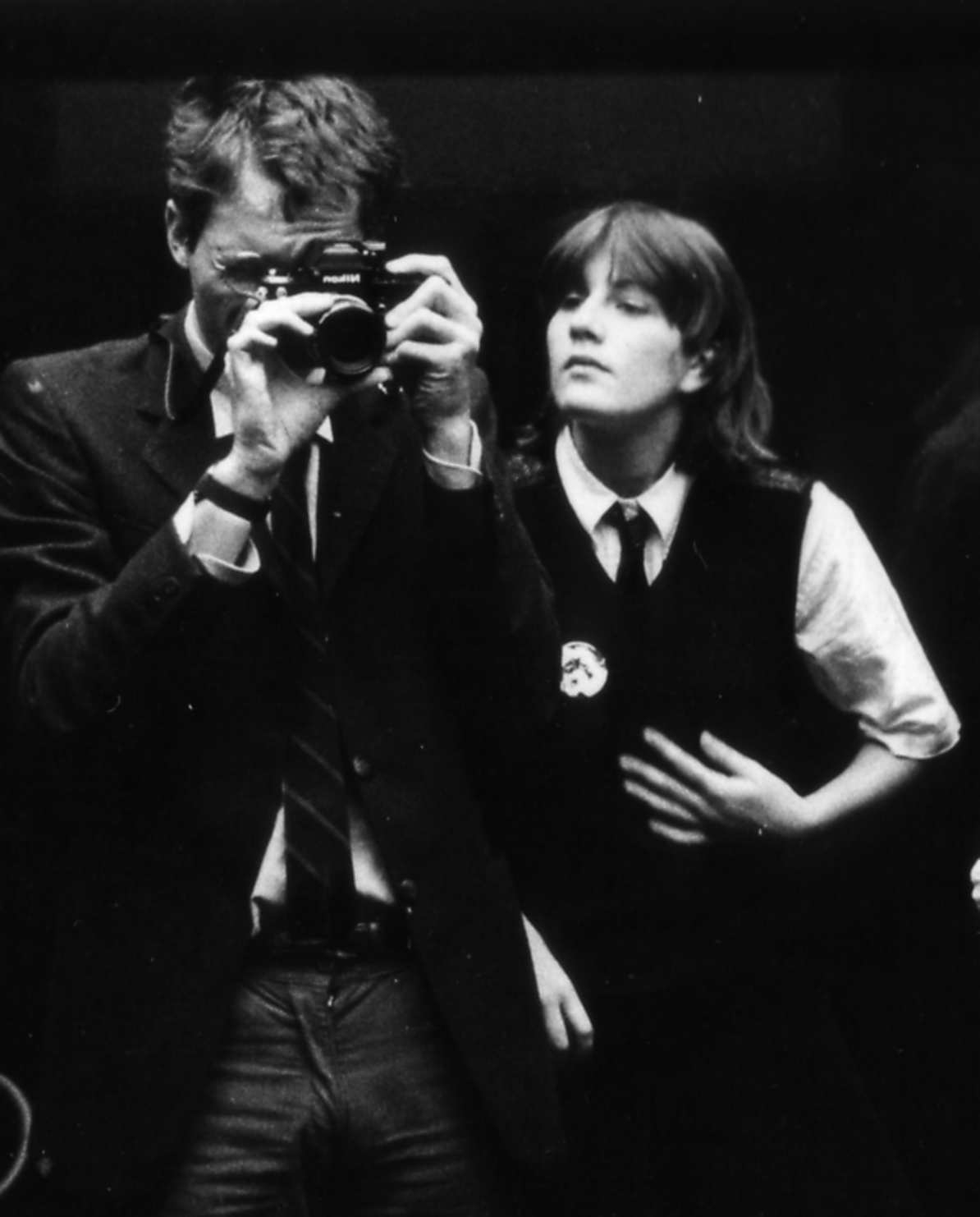
Self-Portrait,1980s

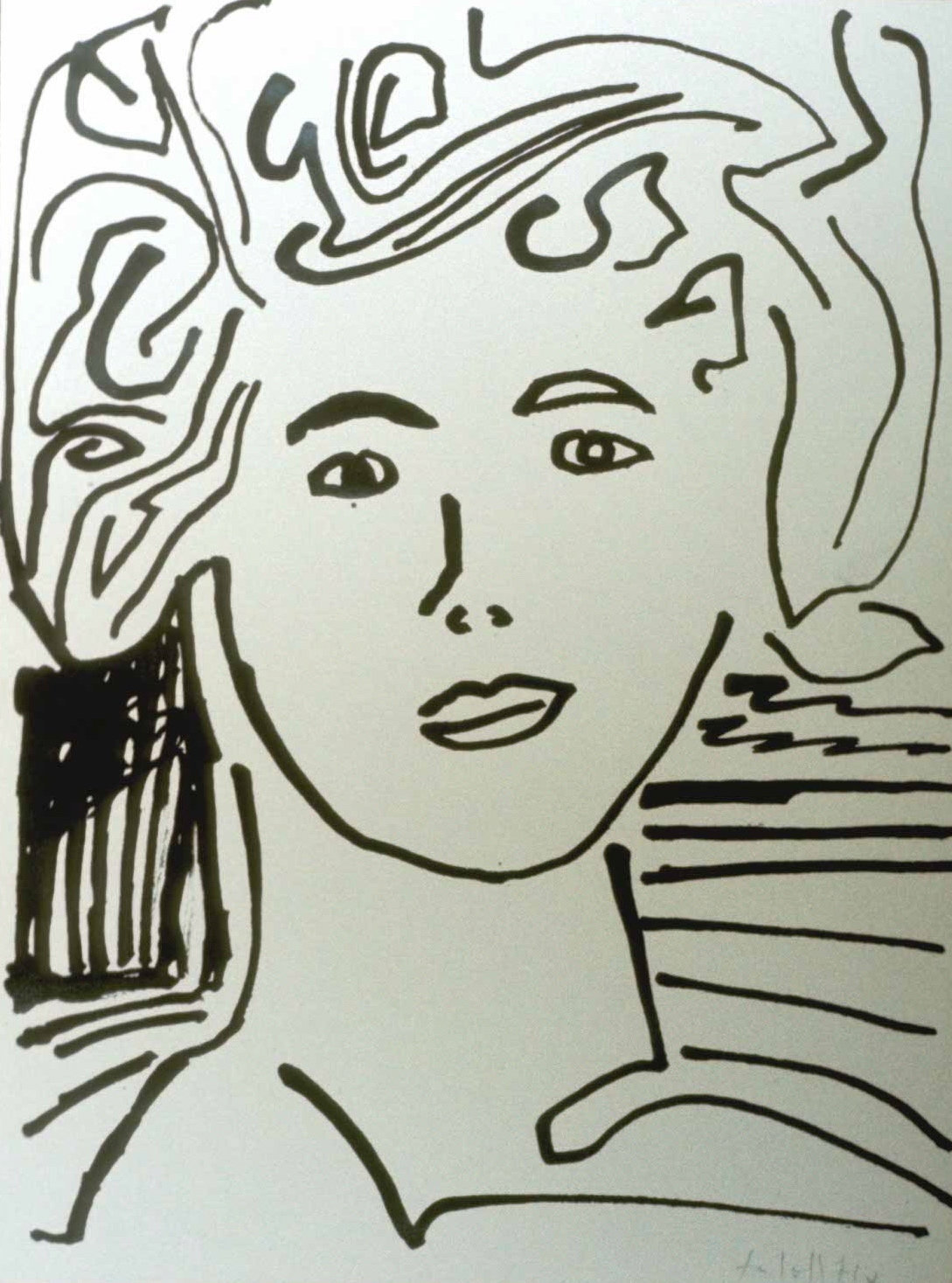
Ink, 1990s

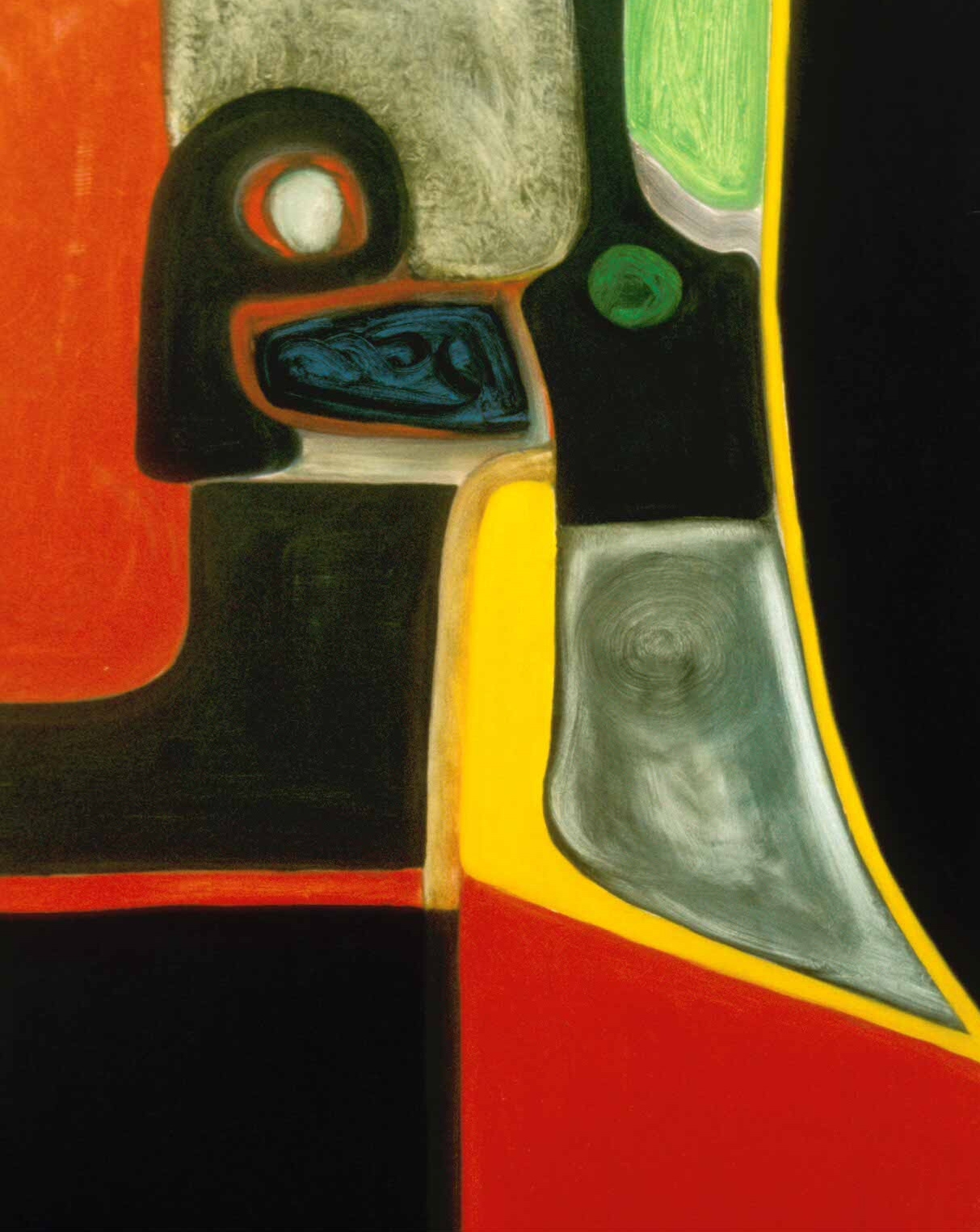
Painting, 1970s

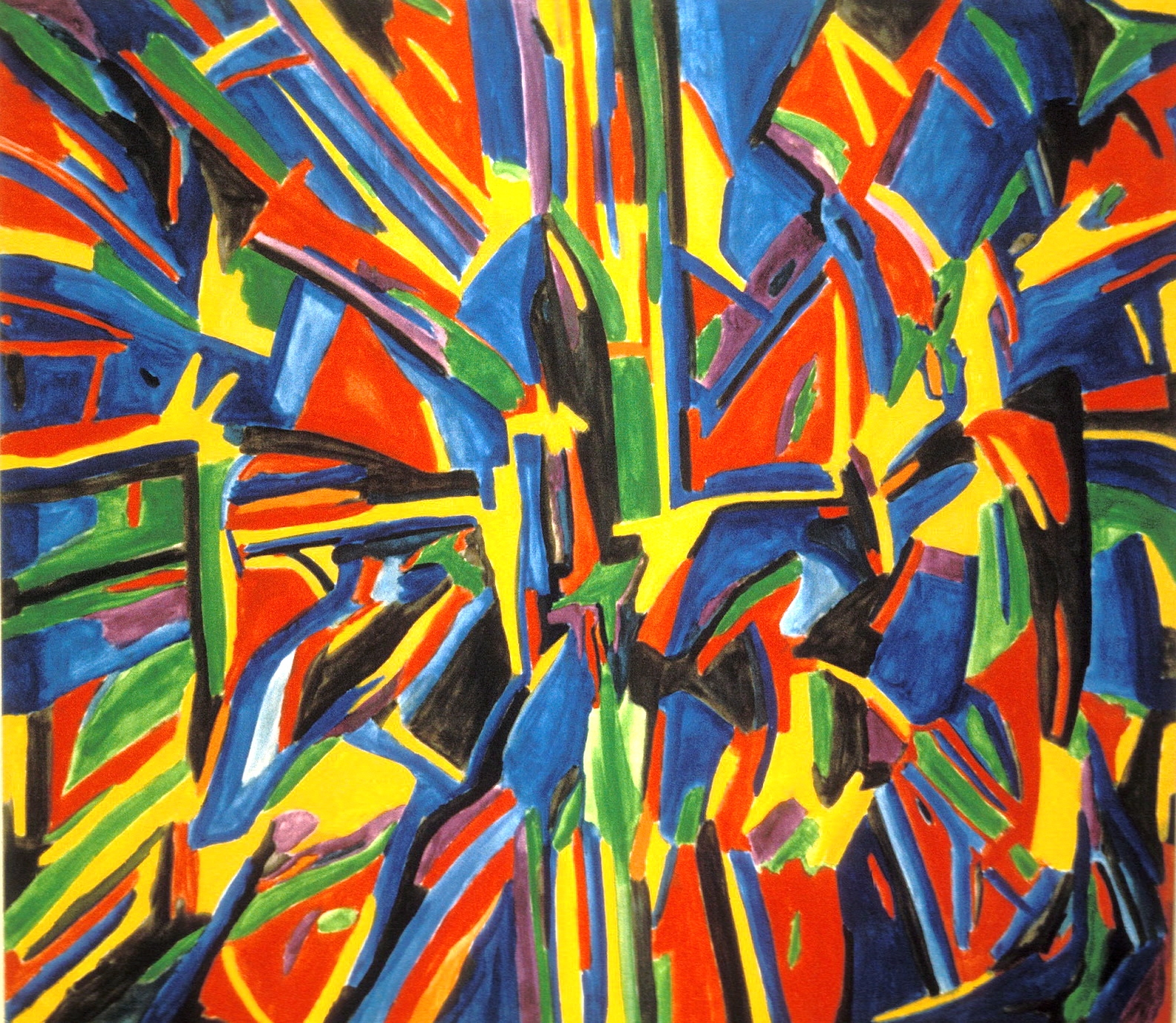
Painting, 1970s

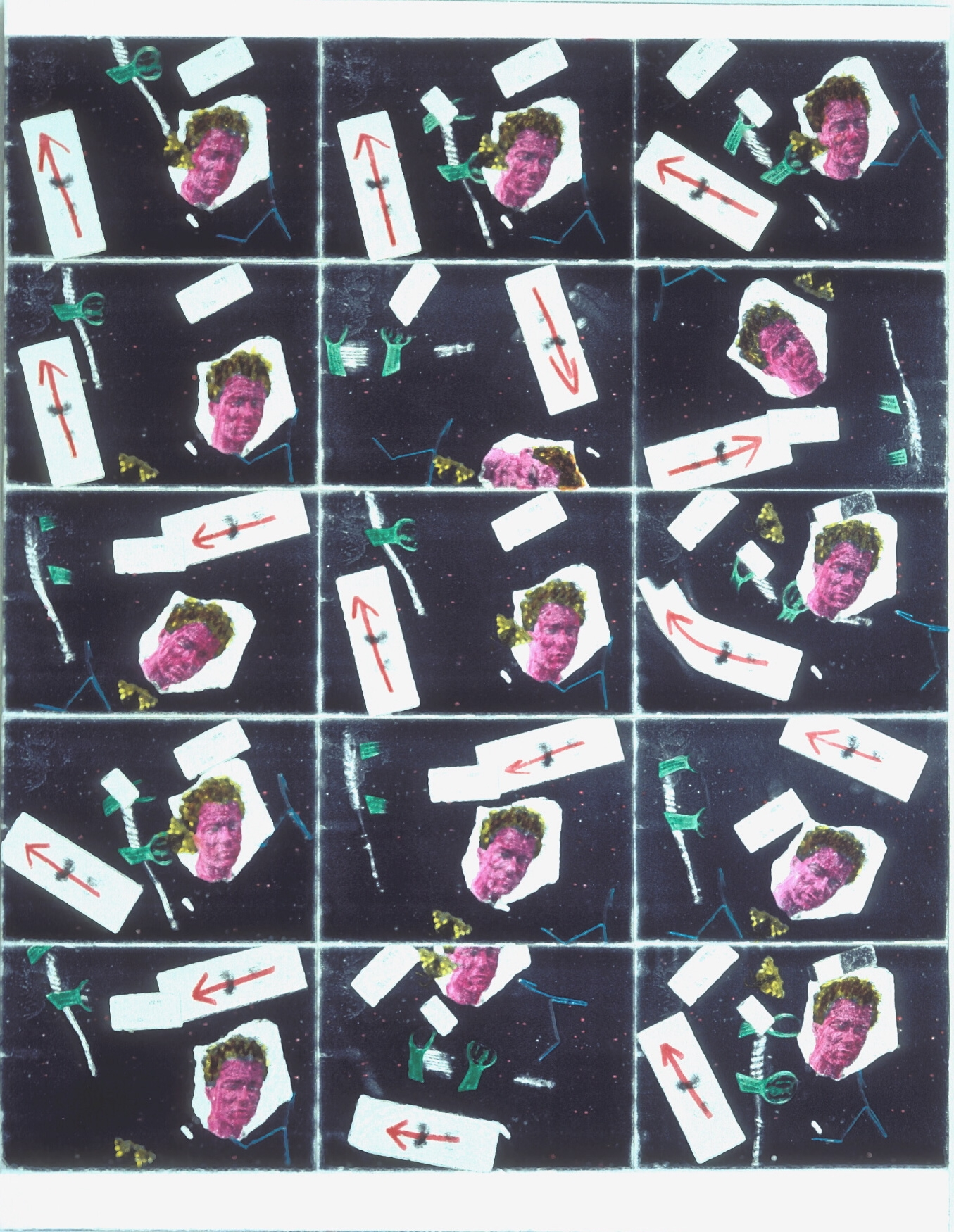
Pop Art, 1980s

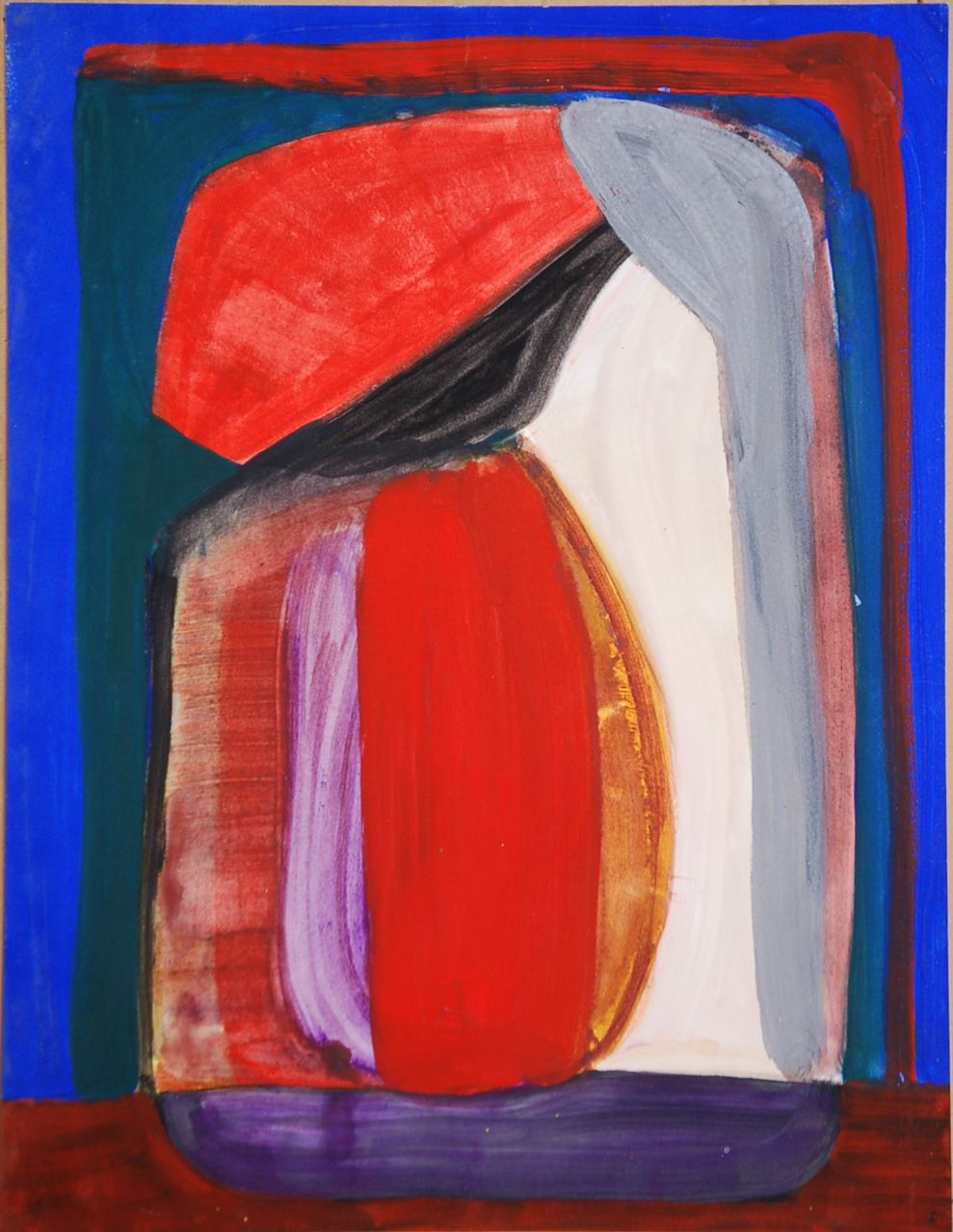
Gouache

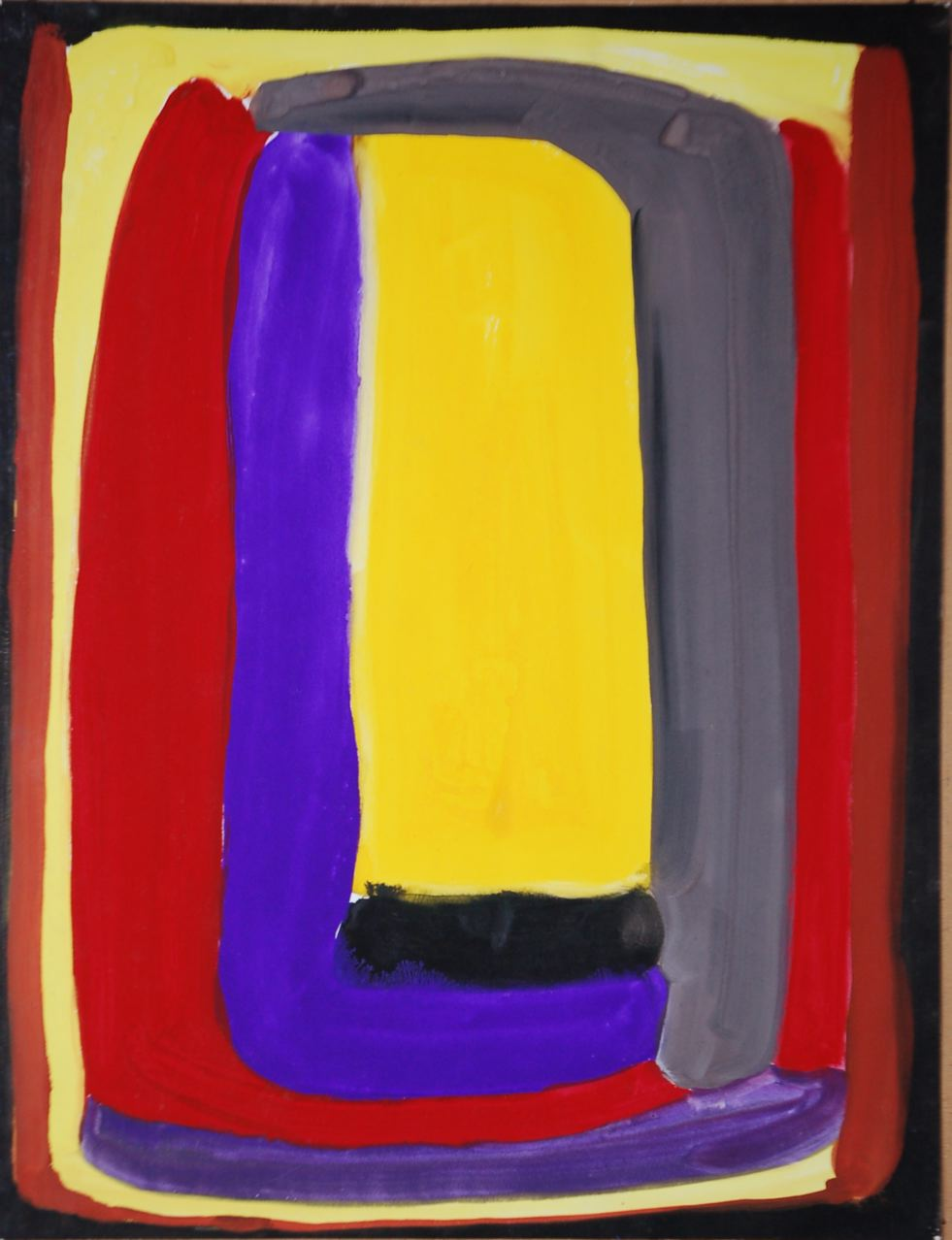
Gouache
