= Elisabeth Coste =

French merchant (1749–1794)

- Born: 1748
- Died: 8 April 1794 (aged 45–46); Montpellier, France
- Occupations: Cloth merchant and law breaker
- Known for: The Gallettes Affair

Elisabeth Coste (born in 1748, died by guillotine on 8 April 1794 in Montpellier) was a French cloth merchant, known for having participated in the so-called "Galettes Affair" during the French Revolution, under the Reign of Terror. During a famine that raged in the Montpellier region, Elisabeth Coste was accused of providing bread (galettes) to hungry exiled priests, despite a city-wide ban on keeping flour at home.

== The Galettes Affair ==
=== Previous legal issues ===
In 1791, Elisabeth Coste experienced significant financial difficulties, due not only to the political and economic situation but also to her father's illness. In particular, she bought back the debt that her father owed to creditors. In 1793, because of the seizure of her assets and the seals affixed to her store, which prevented entry, Coste could no longer work. She hired a lawyer, Jean-Edmond Serres, between February and March 1794 to draw up a petition to lift the seizure of her shop. Unfortunately, Coste's documentation had errors, the lawyer had repeatedly used the pre-revolutionary word "kingdom" instead of the new word "Republic" in his petition, so Costa and Serres were prosecuted for that as well. They were both sentenced to deportation.

=== The bread shortage ===
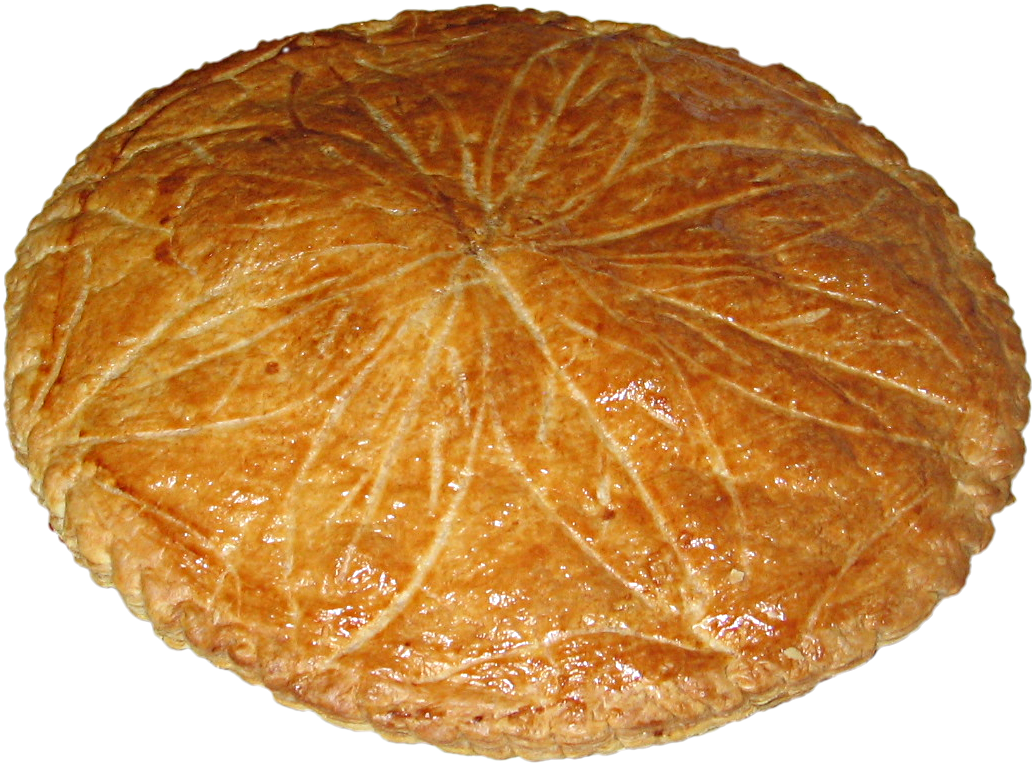
French galette

The harvests of 1793 and 1794 were poor and the inhabitants of Montpellier and its region were plunged into famine so a "bread police" was set up. The city councils rationed food to the population and monitored the production and distribution of bread. In exchange for grain or flour, the inhabitants obtained receipts. This situation caused the development of a black market. On 15 April 1794, the Convention abolished the provincial courts and established a policy of repression: it was in this particular context that the "Galettes Affair" broke out in April 1794.

A baker named Antoine Cantier was illegally making bread at night, but he was exposed by another baker's boy from Montpellier named André Azema who was surprised to see a light on in Cantier's bakery, which was normally dark during the night. On examination, the baker admitted that he had 12 customers, who were all arrested and indicted, including Coste. Because she had previously had legal issues with the criminal court, Coste became the primary defendant. The public prosecutor said she had hoarded scarce flour with the aim of "starving the people and creating an artificial shortage likely to make people regret the [pre-revolutionary] Ancien Régime and to lead to seditious movements." Urged by authorities in Paris, the city of Montpellier decided to make an example of the crime and invited the members of the Popular Society to attend the trial. Authorities hoped that the 12 accused would be prosecuted for counter-revolutionary conspiracy.

On 15 Germinal Year II (4 April 1794), at the age of 46, Coste was interrogated. Accused of having galettes made to supply "some emigrant or deported relative" and to "accredit the false rumor of an impending famine threatening the people," she was found guilty four days later. Four of the 12 accused were sentenced to death. Elisabeth Coste died on the guillotine on 8 April 1794 at Montpellier's Place du Peyrou (as the public square was called during the revolution) with Antoine-François-Alexandre Rolland, Jacques Lazuttes, Louise Huc, who was a merchant like Coste.

Pierre-Antoine Touchy, Jean-Antoine Moinier and Joseph-François-Gaspard Gallié were sentenced to detention. Barthelemi Benezech was sent before the municipal police court of the city of Montpellier. Four defendants were finally acquitted: the baker Antoine Cantier, Jean-Martin Delville, Jean Baillard and Catherine Ferrard.
