= Jules Coste =

French journalist and playwright (1840–1910)

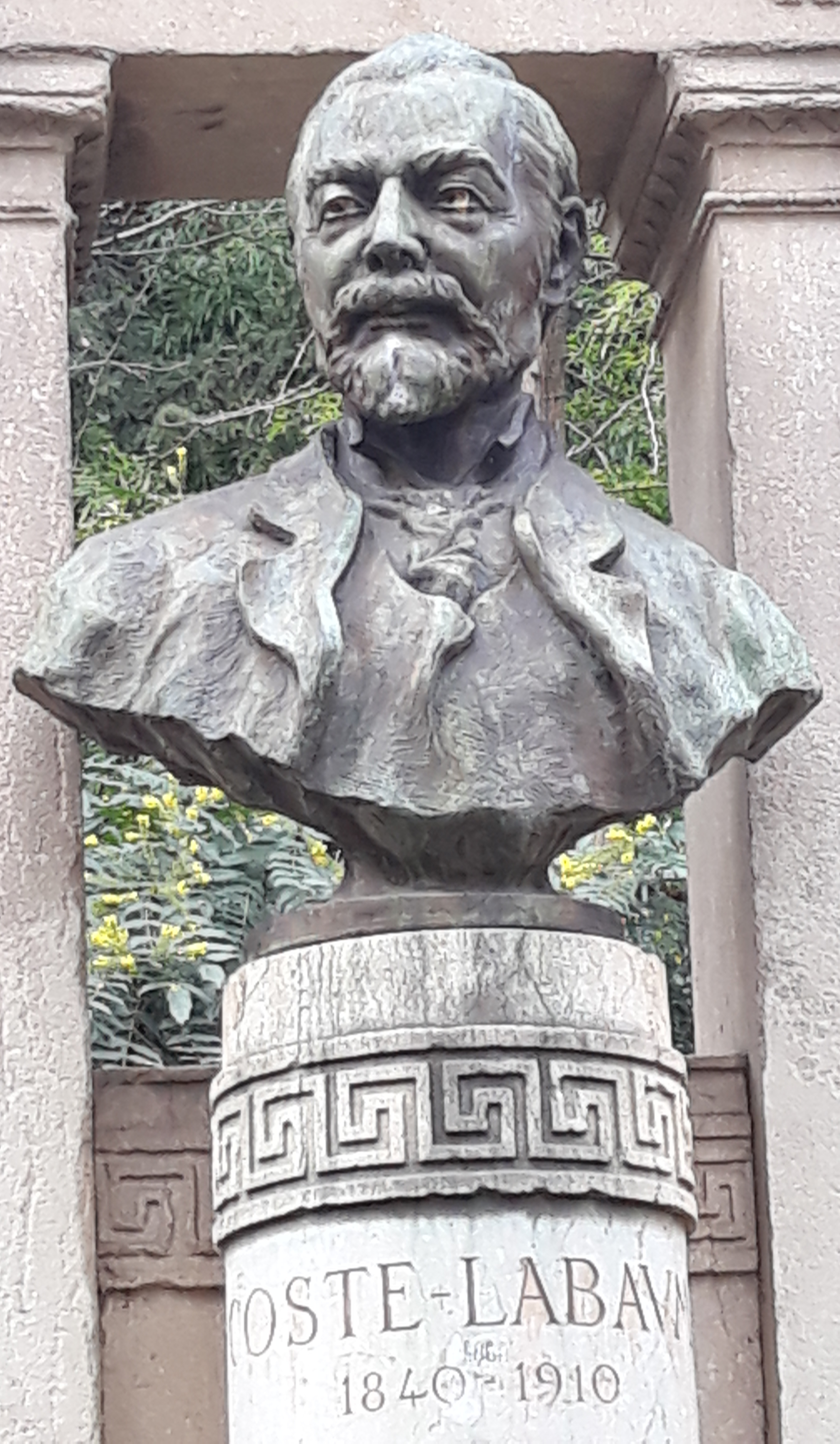
- Coste Jules
- Born: 7 August 1840; Dardilly
- Died: 9 September 1910 (aged 70); Lyon
- Other name: Marius Canard
- Occupations: Journalist; Playwright

Jules Coste, called Coste-Labaume, (7 August 1840 – 9 September 1910) was a French journalist and playwright. His pen name was Marius Canard. He was made chevalier of the Légion d'honneur (6 February 1897) and promoted officier (15 January 1908).

== Works ==
- 1883 : Guignol député
- 1887: L'instruction obligatoire
- 1892: Aux environs de Lyon
