= Coste Rocks Provincial Park =

Provincial park in British Columbia, Canada

- IUCN category II (national park)
- Location within British Columbia
- Interactive map of Coste Rocks Provincial Park
- Location: Range 4 Coast Land District, British Columbia, Canada
- Nearest city: Smithers, British Columbia
- Coordinates: 53°48′24″N 128°47′12″W
- Area: 29 ha (72 acres)
- Established: May 17, 2004
- Governing body: BC Parks

Coste Rocks Provincial Park is a provincial park in British Columbia, Canada, located 23 km south of Kitimat on the south end of Coste Island. The park, which is water access only, was established in 2004; comprising approximately 29 hectares (1 hectares of it upland and 28 hectares of it foreshore).
