= Louise Zoé Coste =

French painter

Louise Zoé Coste or Louise Zoé Meynier (27 September 1805 – 24 September 1890) was a French painter. She was the daughter of the painter Jean-Baptiste Coste and a student of Jean-Baptiste Regnault. She mainly worked in Nantes and exhibited at the Paris Salon from 1831 to 1861.

== Known works ==
- Young man meditating by a tree, 1881

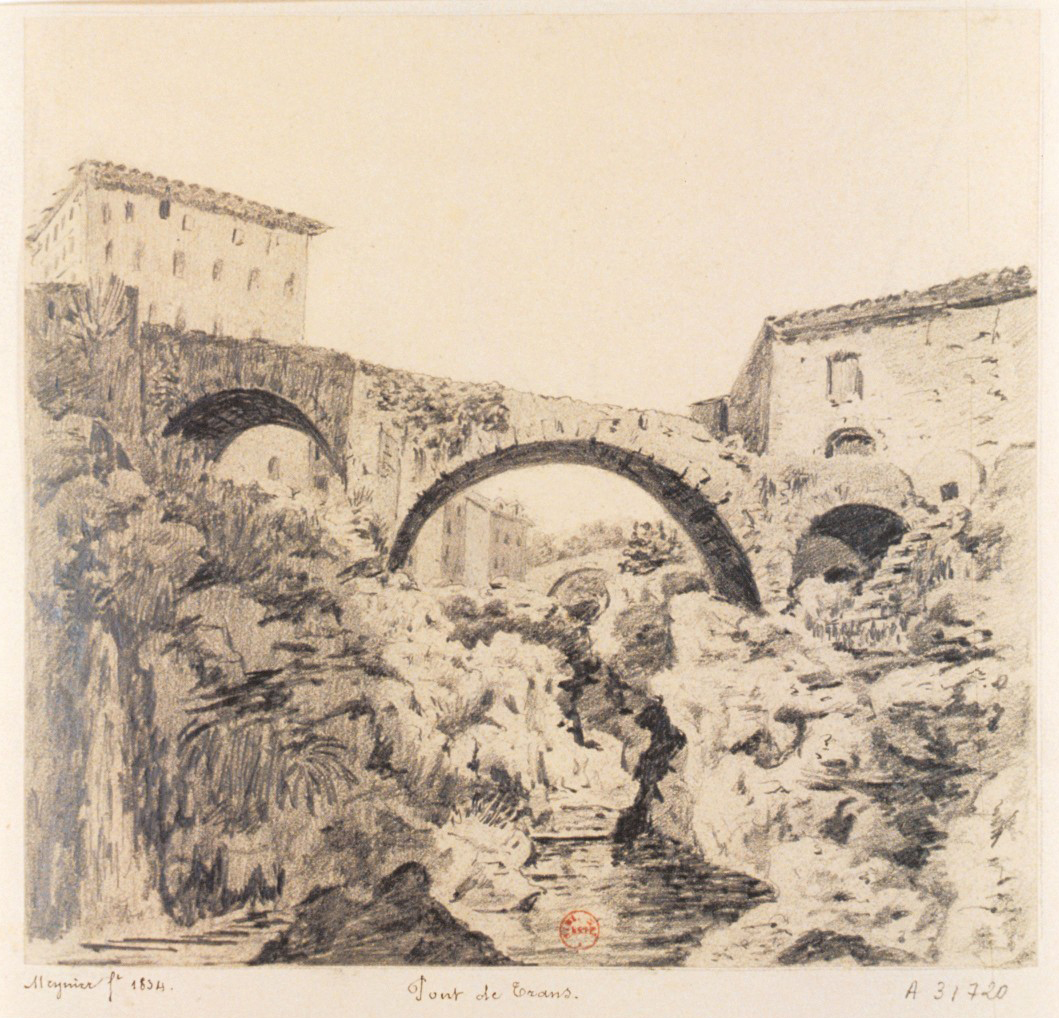
Pont de Trans drawing by Louise Zoé Meynier
