= Musée Grobet-Labadié =

Museum in Marseille, France

Coordinates: 43°18′12″N 5°23′34″E

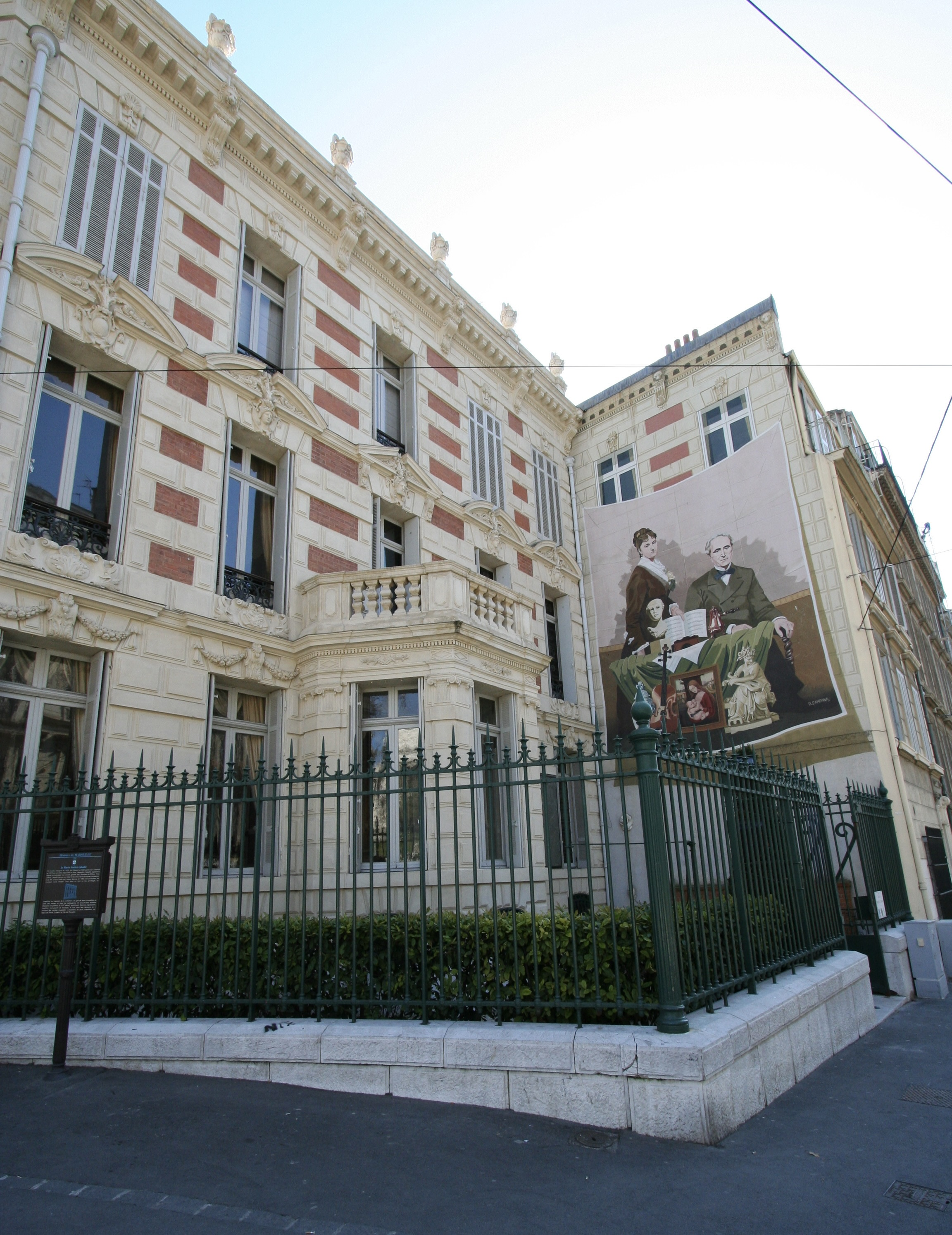
The museum

The Musée Grobet-Labadié is a museum in Marseille, housed in a 19th-century hôtel particulier owned by the family whose collection it displays.

In 1919, Marie Grobet, daughter of the Marseille businessman and politician Alexandre Labadié, gave the family art collection and hôtel particulier to the city.

The museum was inaugurated on November 3, 1925, by Mayor Siméon Flaissières and finally opened its doors to the public in January 1926.

The museum obtained the "Musée de France" label in 2003 and was listed as a historical monument by order of June 15, 2022.
