= Le Mémorial d'Aix =

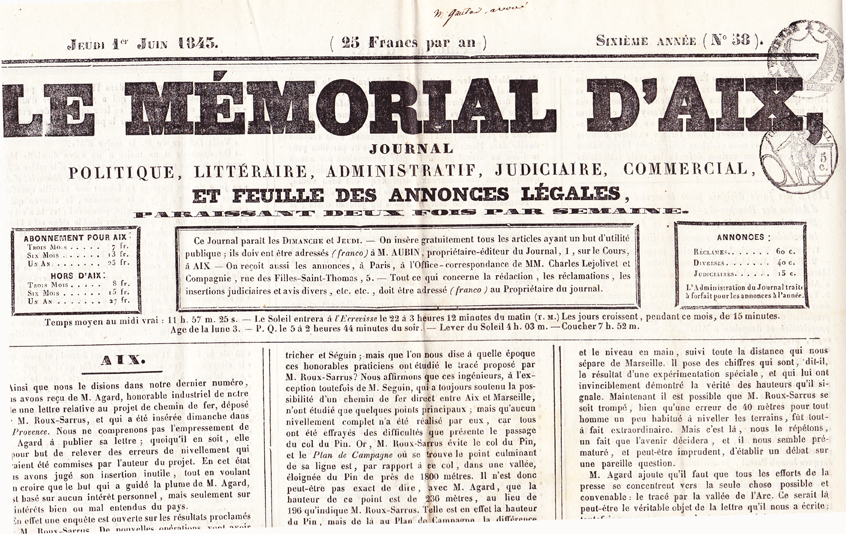
Front page of the Mémorial d'Aix on June 1, 1843

Le Mémorial d'Aix was a bi-weekly French-language newspaper in Aix-en-Provence from 1837 to 1944.

== History ==
The first issue was published on November 18, 1837. The newspaper was initially owned and printed by the Imprimerie Remondet-Aubin (located in the Hôtel du Poët at the top of the Cours Mirabeau). However, it changed ownership in August 1873, when it was purchased by Mr Formental. It was sold in Provence and Paris. It published local news, but also serial novels. Jean-Baptiste Gaut (1819–1891) served as its editor-in-chief. Émile Zola (1840–1902) published some articles in it.

It became defunct in 1944, when the written press was outlawed by the Germans during World War II. The last issue was published on August 13, 1944. After the war, two new newspapers claimed to be its successor: Terre de Provence and Le Courrier d'Aix.

Old issues are kept in the Bibliothèque Méjanes, a public library in Aix-en-Provence.

== Secondary source ==
- M. Chabert, Aix-en-Provence au XIXe siècle : Chroniques et faits divers du Mémorial d'Aix, Aix-en-Provence: Édisud, 2001.
