= Jorge Coste (footballer) =

Mexican footballer (born 1988)

Jorge Coste Cacho
- Born: 11 November 1988 (age 37)
- Occupation: Professional football defender

Jorge Coste Cacho (born 11 November 1988) is a Mexican professional football defender who formerly played for Chiapas in the Primera División de México.
