= Sharon Coste =

French soprano of Canadian origin

Sharon Coste (born in Montreal, 13 June 1963) is a French soprano of Canadian origin.

== Career ==
The recipient of several prizes and awards, among which at the Geneva, Paris, Toulouse and Bilbao international competitions, the Voix d’Or Prize (France), and the Mozart Prize of the Canadian Opera Company, Sharon Coste has sung on numerous European and North American opera stages including the Opéra National de Paris-Bastille, the Opéra National du Rhin, Florida Grand Opera, the Opéra de Nantes, the Canadian Opera Company, Karlsruhe Opern, Lübeck Opern, L’Esplanade de Saint-Étienne, the Opéra de Montréal, the Opéra-Théâtre de Metz, and the Opéra de Chambre de Genève.

Recognised for her Mozart heroines – Donna Anna, Fiordiligi, Pamina, Contessa, Constanze, Vitellia – Sharon Coste also sings several leading French, Italian and Russian roles: Dialogue des Carmélites, Faust, Manon, Les Contes d’Hoffmann, Eugene Oneguin, Il Barbiere di Siviglia, La Fille du Régiment, La Bohème, La Traviata, Norma, and Aida.

Sharon Coste has performed under the baton of conductors such as Philippe Herreweghe, Jean-Claude Casadesus, Emmanuel Krivine, Serge Baudo and Alain Lombard, notably appearing with the Orchestre National de Paris, the Orchestre National de Lyon, the Toronto Symphony Orchestra, and the Orchestre de la Sorbonne, in a vast repertoire that includes the Requiems of Mozart, Verdi, Fauré, Lloyd Webber and McCartney, the Nuits d’été by Berlioz, the Stabat Maters of Pergolesi and Poulenc, Elias and Psalm 42 by Mendelssohn, Die Jahreszeiten by Haydn, the 14th Symphony by Shostakovitch, and Myrrah by Caplet. A graduate of the University of Alberta, Sharon Coste was a member of the Canadian Opera Company Ensemble, and studied at the Salzburg Mozarteum Summer Academy and the Académie de Royaumont. She has recorded for Harmonia Mundi (Diapason d’or), Naxos Records, Musica Numeris and Koch International.

== Recordings ==
- French Music around 1900 – Ensemble Musique Oblique. Label: Harmonia Mundi
- Gounod: Sapho – Nouvel orchestre de Saint-Etienne, Patrick Fournillier (conductor). Label: Koch Schwann
- Caplet/Debussy/Ravel: Prix de Rome Cantatas. Label: Marco Polo

== Sources ==
- Naxos Records, Biography: Sharon Coste, soprano
