= Jorge Coste (water polo) =

Mexican water polo player (born 1959)

Personal information
- Nationality: Mexican
- Born: 28 January 1959 (age 66)

Sport
- Sport: Water polo

Jorge Coste (born 28 January 1959) is a Mexican water polo player. He competed in the men's tournament at the 1976 Summer Olympics.
