= La Part-Dieu =

Neighbourhood and central business district in Lyon, France

Coordinates: 45°45′40″N 4°51′26″E

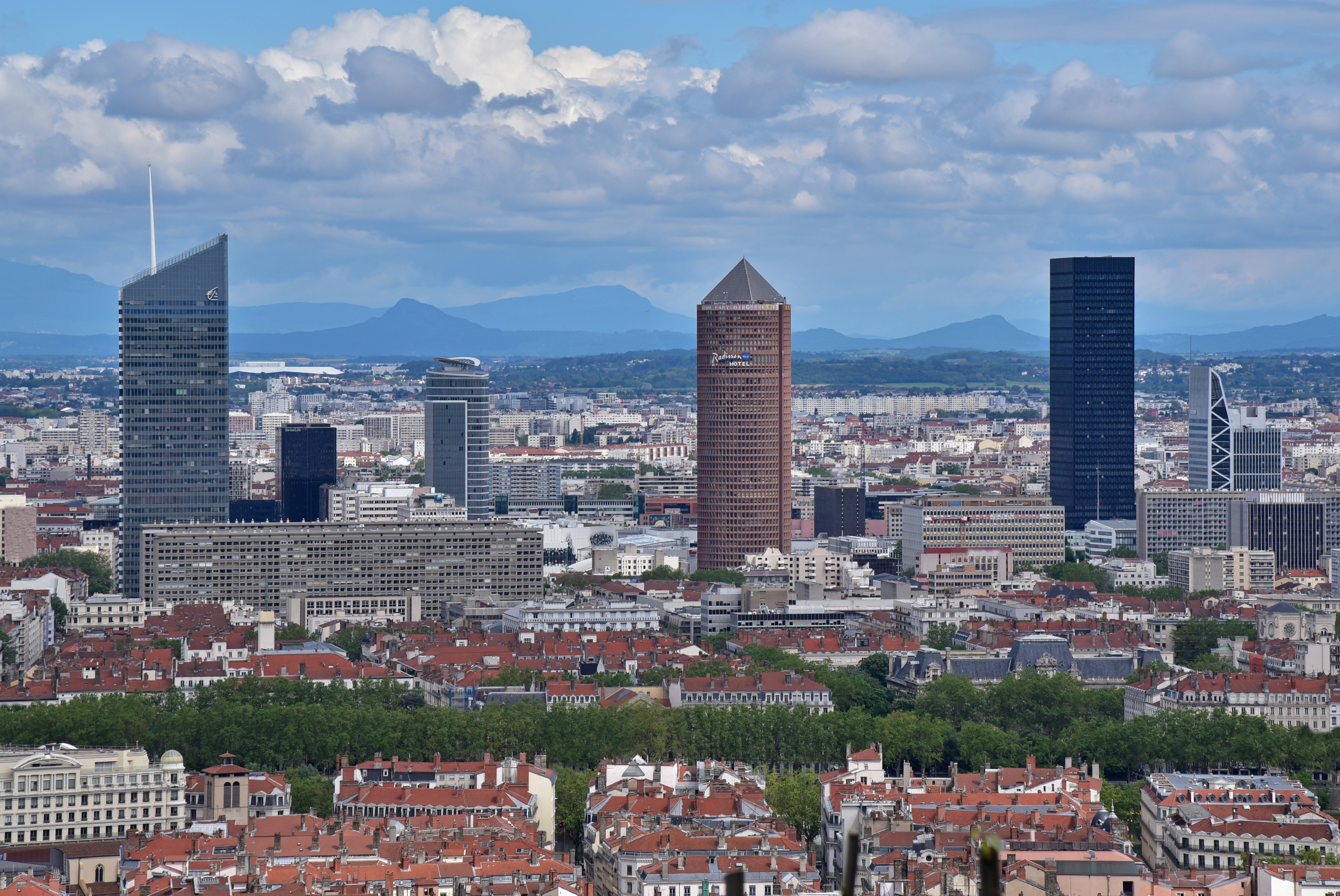
- View of La Part-Dieu in 2023
- Interactive map of La Part-Dieu
- Country: France
- Région: Auvergne-Rhône-Alpes
- Métropole: Lyon
- Commune: Lyon
- Arrondissement: 3rd

Area
  - Total: 1.17 km^{2} (0.45 sq mi)

Population (2016)
  - Total: 20,600
  - Density: 17,606/km^{2} (45,600/sq mi)
- Time zone: UTC+01:00
- Postal code: 69003
- Website: www.lyon-partdieu.com/en/

La Part-Dieu (French: [la paʁdjø]) is a central business district in the 3rd arrondissement of Lyon, France. It is the second-largest tertiary district in France, after La Défense in Greater Paris. The area also contains Lyon's principal railway station, Gare de La Part-Dieu.

The district hosts major commercial, cultural, and entertainment facilities, including Westfield La Part-Dieu shopping centre, Paul Bocuse indoor food market, café terraces, the Auditorium concert hall, the Bourse du Travail theatre, the Municipal Library, the Departmental Archives and Fort Montluc. It is home to several high-rise buildings, such as Tour Incity (202 m (663 ft)), Tour To-Lyon (171 m (561 ft)) and Tour Part-Dieu (164 m (538 ft)).

The central business district has undergone a large-scale renovation and redevelopment programme, representing €2.5 billion in combined public and private investment.

== History ==
=== Landed estate and fortifications ===
The area currently comprising the La Part-Dieu district long consisted of fields and marshland subject to flooding from the Rhône. Around 1150, Guillaume de Fuer, a member of Lyon’s patrician family, donated the land to the monks of Saint-Irénée; and in 1203, under the abbacy of Humbert de Forez, the Abbey of Saint-Irénée entrusted the land to Jean Blanchard for its maintenance on the abbey’s behalf.

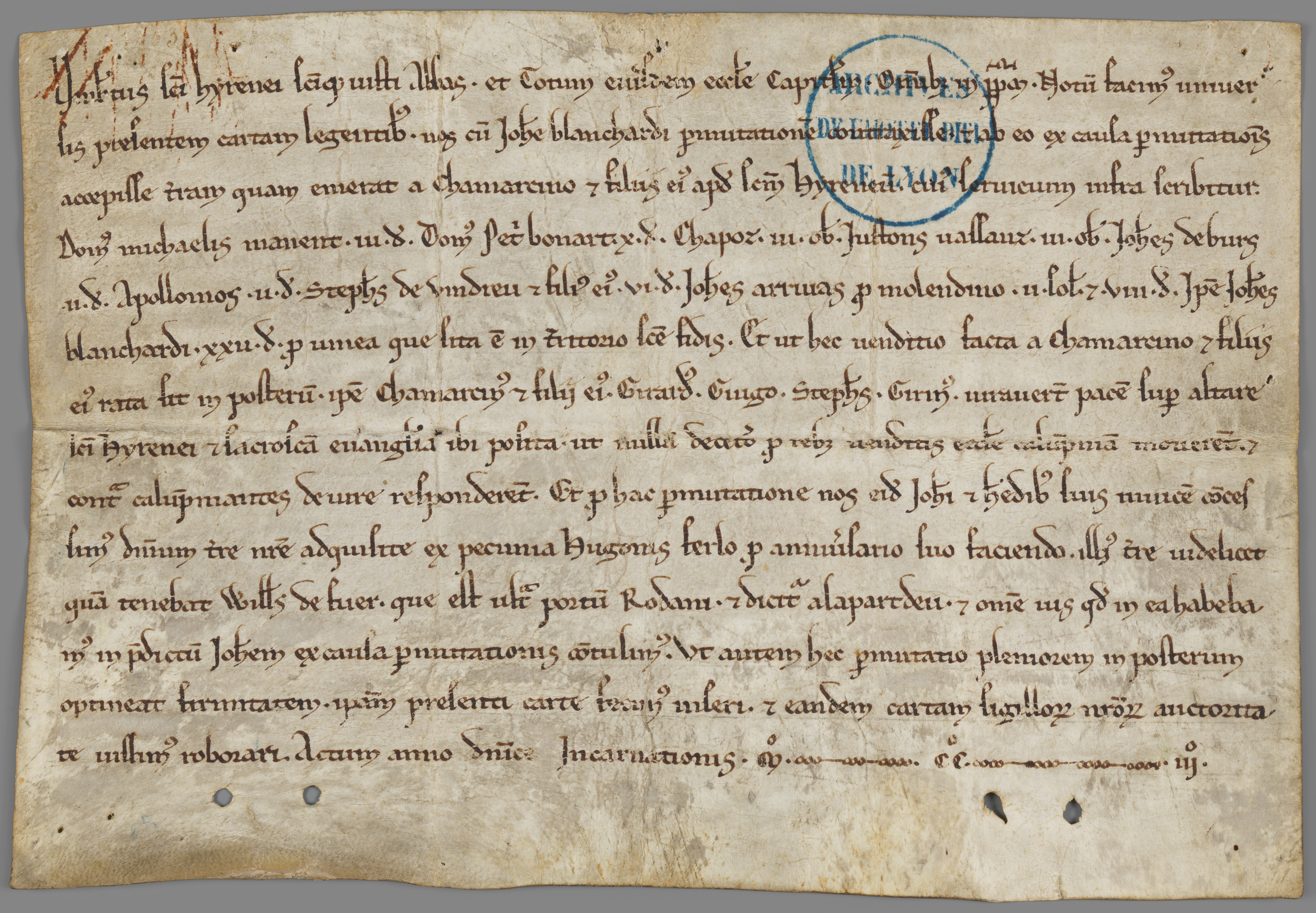
On the fourth line from the bottom, to the right of centre, the manuscript reads alapartdeu, appearing after the word Rodani

During the late 15th century, the Rousselet family consolidated various disparate medieval parcels of land into a single unified estate, establishing a seigneurial domain east of the Rhône.

In 1571, Jean (Jehan) Le Mort, ordinary secretary to Queen Catherine de' Medici, purchased the estate alongside its maison forte (fortified manor house). In 1620, the fortified domain passed to the nobleman Amable de la Pelonce. Following his death, the estate was acquired in 1649 by Genis Dumas through legal succession.

In 1670, former Lyon alderman (échevin) Marc-Antoine Mazenod purchased La Part-Dieu, subsequently expanding its boundaries towards the Rhône. Upon his death in 1679, the estate passed to his daughter, Catherine, who retained sole ownership even after her 1694 marriage to Maurice de Servient (thereafter becoming known as Madame de Servient). In 1725, she bequeathed the domain to Hôtel-Dieu de Lyon. Following her death in 1733, the Hospices de Lyon assumed full possession, completing the acquisition by 1737.

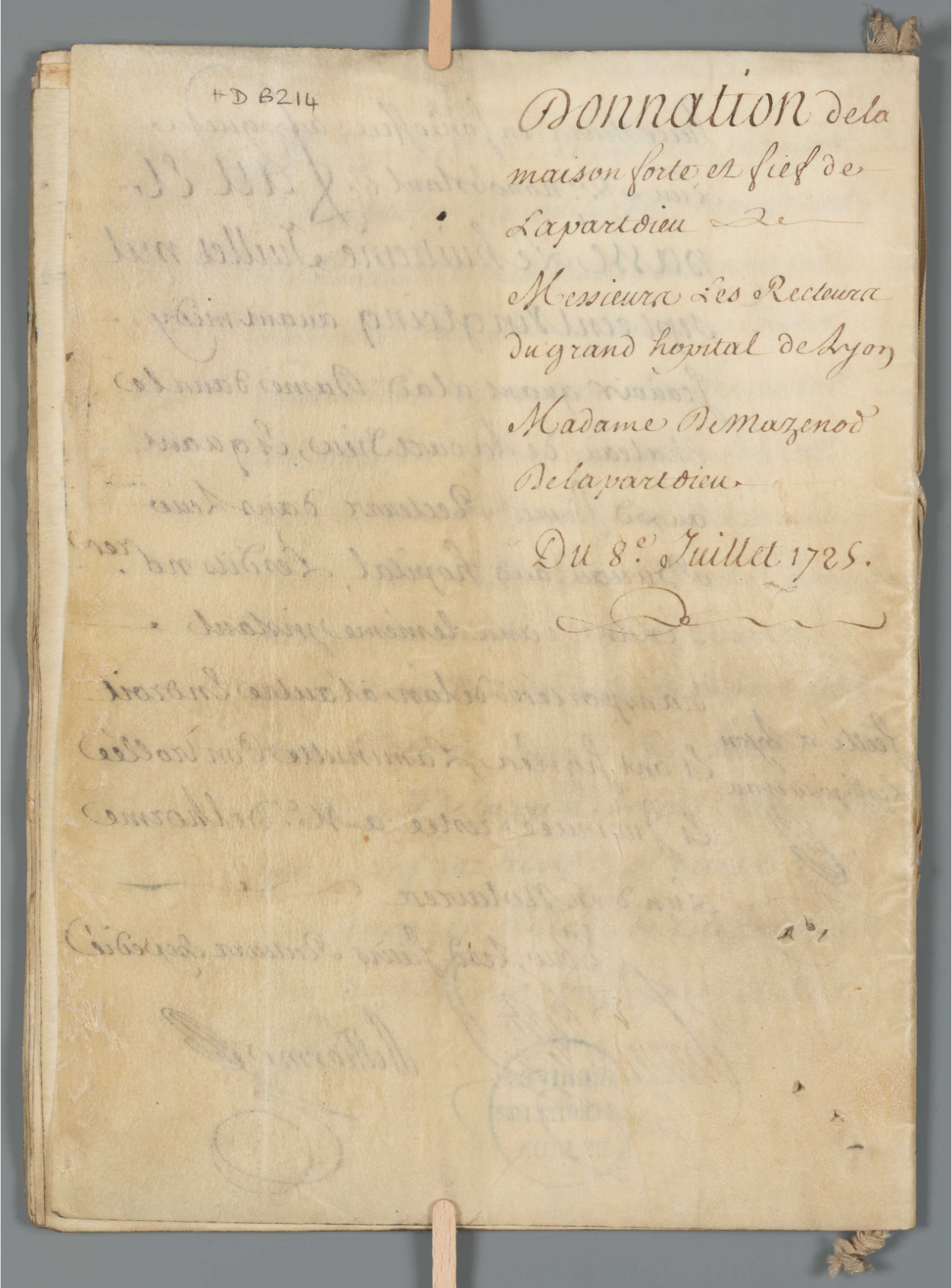
The bequest of Catherine Mazenod’s Part-Dieu estate to the Hospices Civils de Lyon

The embankment of the Rhône river and construction of bridges (see Bridges of Lyon) from 1772 onwards reduced flood risks and facilitated urbanisation of the river's eastern bank. By the end of the 18th century, the La Part-Dieu estate was a substantial property situated between the Brotteaux and Guillotière districts.

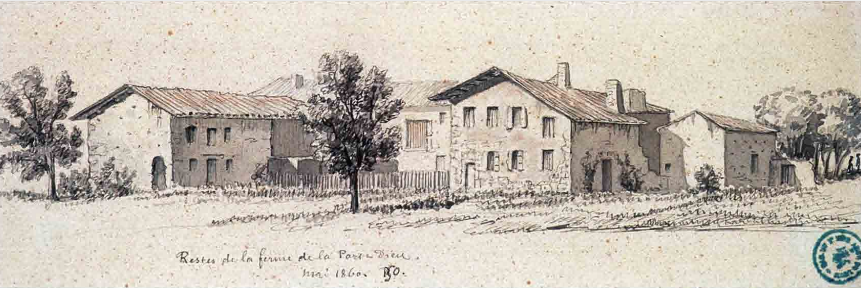
Remnants of the Part-Dieu farm estate around 1860

=== Cavalry barracks and marshalling yards ===
Between 1830 and 1848, Lyon erected defensive walls against potential foreign invasions. As part of this defense system, Montluc Fort was constructed in 1831, giving La Part-Dieu its initial military role. In 1844, the public hospitals sold additional land to the military administration, which constructed cavalry barracks between 1851 and 1863. The district was officially incorporated into the administrative boundaries of Lyon in 1852, though urban growth remained constrained—Rue Lafayette was the only direct road connecting La Part-Dieu to Central Lyon.

To connect Lyon with Geneva, the Chemins de fer de Paris à Lyon et à la Méditerranée constructed the Gare des Brotteaux. This required dismantling the city’s fortifications to clear space for new railway lines. Owing to Lyon's administrative, urban, and geological complexity, the expansion of rail transport led to the creation of multiple stations; during this era, the Part-Dieu station served exclusively as a marshalling yard.

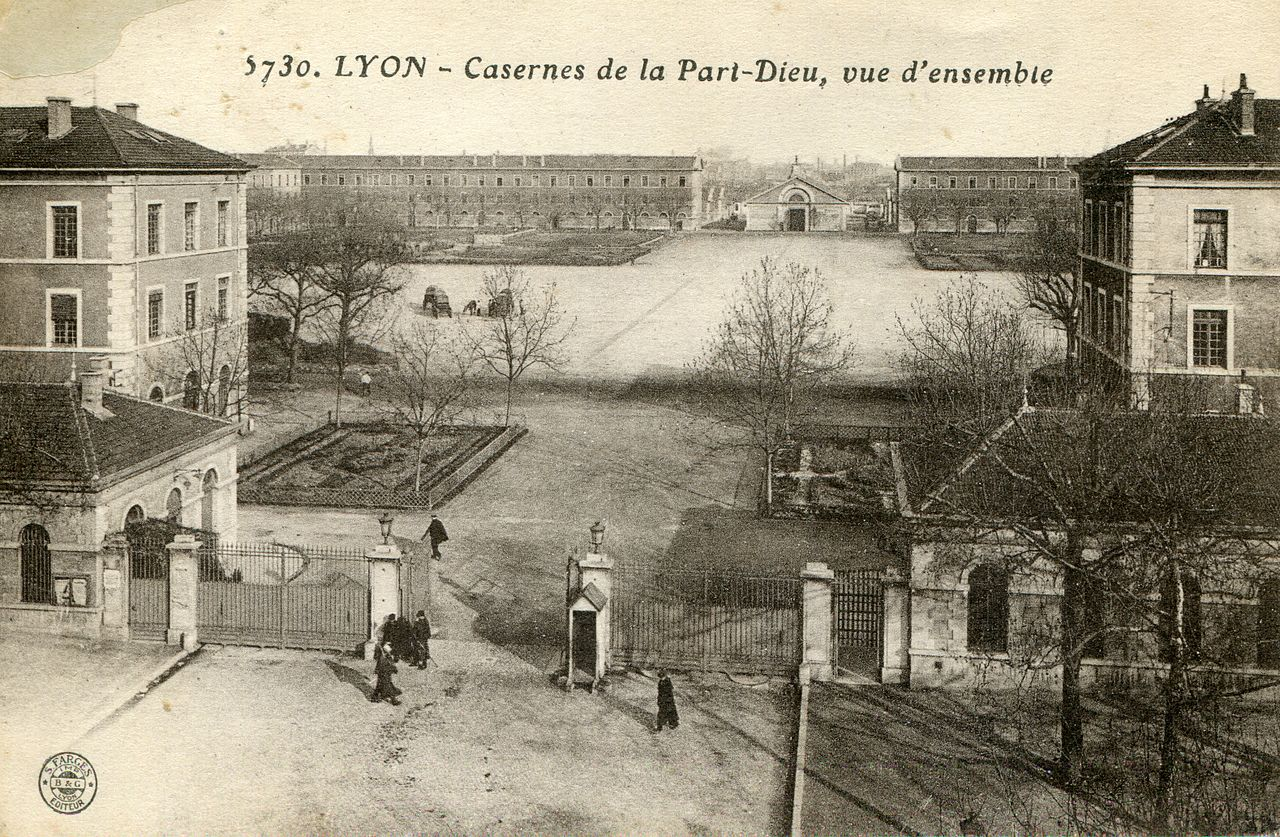
Part-Dieu cavalry barracks in the first half of the 20th century

Meanwhile, the military compound took on the orthogonal footprint of the original farm estate. The military compound retained the orthogonal layout of the original farm estate, and many cavalry units stationed there were mobilised during the First World War, an heritage commemorated today in the naming of the Cuirassiers car park.

At the beginning of the 20th century, Édouard Herriot was elected Mayor of Lyon, then the most prominent French city outside Paris due to its dynamic industrial and commercial activity. Influenced by the French hygiéniste urban movement, akin to Baron Haussmann's renovation of Paris, Herriot initiated extensive works to improve urban infrastructure and public spaces. The continued expansion of rail and road networks to the east transformed the La Part-Dieu marshalling yards. In 1926, an urban development plan inspired by American downtowns was proposed.

=== Post-war housing ===
Following the Second World War, France's top priorities were to rebuild the housing stock fast, to push for economic development and to favour efficient movements by car. France prioritised rapid reconstruction of housing, economic growth, and improved car transport infrastructure. Owing to changes in military strategy, La Part-Dieu's military compound lost its strategic importance and was incorporated into a major housing development plan.

In 1960, the French State sold the land to the private developer SERL to initiate the project. Demolition of existing structures lasted five years. The presence of extensive land holdings owned by public bodies—including the hospitals, the SNCF, and the military—enabled a complete transformation of the site within the city centre.

The project evolved under the mandate of Mayor Louis Pradel, extending beyond housing to include the creation of an administrative centre and private office space for public services such as radio stations and police headquarters. The winning architectural design followed the principles of the Athens Charter, a modernist urban planning doctrine developed by Le Corbusier.

This approach promoted the separation of pedestrian and vehicular traffic through elevated concrete walkways, similar to the design of La Défense fashion, with vehicles occupying the lower street level. Overhead, orthogonal buildings on reinforced concrete stilts reflected the Unité d'habitation concept. Architects Jacques Perrin-Fayolle, Jean Sillan, and Jean Zumbrunnen designed several of the structures; however, only one-third of the planned buildings were ultimately constructed.

=== Directional center ===
While the Charles de Gaulle government promoted the decentralisation of France, the car-centred urbanism of the Trente Glorieuses period encouraged peripheral expansion at the expense of city centres. In response, a master plan was developed by urban planners Charles Delfante and Jean Zumbrunnen under the direction of Mayor Louis Pradel. The plan aimed to establish La Part-Dieu as a symbol of modernity, with commercial, business, and cultural functions designed to compete with Paris and other international cities. A central railway station was proposed, but the SNCF declined to finance it, undermining the vision for the district as a major directional centre.

Lyon was intended to serve as a “balancing metropolis”, supported by regional cities such as Grenoble and Saint Etienne, to counter urban decline and depopulation through a network of motorways intersecting at La Part-Dieu. The original design envisaged major east–west and north–south green corridors, pedestrian-friendly public spaces including a central square well served by public transport, and an iconic tower matching the height of the Basilica of Notre-Dame de Fourvière on its historical hill.

The oil crises of the 1970s and subsequent housing shortages shifted priorities towards profitability, which contributed to the district's isolation from the wider city. Pedestrian movement was hindered by the disruption of major thoroughfares caused by the expansion of the central shopping centre, by the prioritisation of car traffic over public transport, and by the construction of elevated concrete walkways that left individual buildings as isolated “islands”. Despite these limitations, several landmark structures were completed in the decade, including the Municipal Library (1972), the shopping centre and Auditorium (1975) and Tour Part-Dieu (1977). The district distinguished itself from the historic centre through a strong architectural identity and a concentration of high-end business functions and public services.

=== Major rail node ===
In 1974, a decision was taken to relocate the former Brotteaux station to La Part-Dieu, capitalising on its central position. Lyon Métro Line reached the site in 1978, with a station constructed beneath the shopping centre. Half of the marshalling yards were redeveloped into a large-scale real estate project to finance the new station, built on both sides of the railway tracks. The goal was to better integrate the district's rail infrastructure, linking central Lyon with its eastern neighbourhoods. In 1983, La Part-Dieu became the terminus of France's first high-speed rail line (TGV), connecting Lyon and Paris. However, major urban roads such as Boulevard Vivier-Merle continued to separate the business district and the station from central Lyon.

=== European business district ===
During the 1990s, expansion of La Part-Dieu slowed due to significant urban development elsewhere in the metropolitan area, particularly in the Confluence district, the Cité Internationale, Gerland, and the La Doua campus. The City Council sought to reduce car use and promote public transport within the city, while also aspiring to establish a European-scale business district by doubling office capacity and adding seven new high-rise buildings, including the Swiss Life and Oxygène towers. Many of these proposals were ultimately abandoned as municipal priorities shifted.

Other objectives included reintegrating the district into its urban surroundings by reconfiguring major thoroughfares, introducing the T1 tramway, renovating public spaces, improving connections between the metro and the main railway station, and demolishing elevated pedestrian bridges.

== Urbanity ==
=== Urban and green space ===
La Part-Dieu, home to approximately 21,000 inhabitants, extends on both sides of the railway line and is characterised by a mix of high-rise and low-rise architecture. According to the SPL Lyon Part-Dieu, the district located in Lyon's 3rd arrondissement is roughly bounded by Rue Garibaldi to the west (adjacent to the Rhône Docks and Place Guichard), Rue Juliette Récamier to the north (Brotteaux), Boulevard Maurice Flandin to the east (La Villette), and the former La Buire automotive plants to the south (ZAC de La Buire). The district's original development was modelled on the urban planning principles of La Défense in Greater Paris.

The River Rize once flowed through La Part-Dieu but has since been channelled into a covered sewer system. Contemporary urban planning strategies focus on mitigating the urban heat island effects through the creation and enhancement of green spaces. For example, Rue Garibaldi—formerly a major urban thoroughfare—has been redeveloped as part of a green corridor linking Tête d’Or Park to Sergent Blandan Park and Gerland Park. Public spaces in the district include several plazas (Europe, Gérard Collomb, Voltaire, and Francfort), gardens (Jugan, Jacob-Kaplan, and Sainte-Marie-Perrin), Montluc Fort and Nelson Mandela Park. The district also retains century-old plane trees dating from the former cavalry barracks.

== Governance ==
The current mayor of the 3rd arrondissement is environmentalist Véronique Bertrand-Dubois, who serves on the permanent commission of Lyon Metropolis as an adviser on urban housing, planning, and policy matters.

The SPL Lyon Part-Dieu, a publicly owned local development corporation, acts as an operational body for local authorities. Established in 2014, it is governed by a board chaired by David Kimelfeld, president of Lyon Metropolis. The organisation employs around 20 staff working on urban, economic, and resource-related issues, and is responsible for managing, coordinating, promoting, and overseeing the La Part-Dieu redevelopment project.

Lyon Metropolis has its headquarters in La Part-Dieu, in a brutalist-style constructed in the 1970s on Rue Garibaldi. The building accommodates hundreds of civil servants and regularly hosts meetings of local officials. Other key institutions in the district include the Police Headquarters, located in Fort Montluc, and the headquarters of SYTRAL Mobilités, the Lyon public transport authority.

=== Urban services ===
La Part-Dieu contains a range of urban amenities, including four sports facilities, nine private nurseries, concierge services such as dry cleaning and postal provision, primary schools, business schools, and the Manufacture des Tabacs campus of Jean Moulin University Lyon 3.

== Economy ==
=== Regional and urban context ===
The Auvergne-Rhône-Alpes region, with a GDP of €250 billion, is the second-largest French and fourth-largest European region in terms of GDP. Approximately 70,000 companies are created there each year. It is the leading industrial region in France (employing 500,000 people in industry across 50,000 sites) and second in terms of exports (imports account for 11.2% and exports for 12.4% of France's total trade). Chemicals are the main export sector.

According to a 2018 study by the Globalization and World Cities Research Network (GaWC), Lyon is classified as a Beta- city, meaning that it is an important globalised city, instrumental in linking its region or state into the world economy. It is also a credible alternative to Paris, with a GDP of €74.6 billion and France's second-largest business park.

=== Economic landscape ===
Over half of the La Part-Dieu district's economic activity is dedicated to sustainable city and smart systems, showing growth of 16% between 2008 and 2013 and now representing more than 30,000 jobs out of 45,000 tertiary jobs and 60,000 total jobs inside the district.

- City infrastructure and urban services (18,000 jobs)
  - City and building construction (Bouygues, Icade, Foncia, Lyon Metropolis, Préfecture du Rhône, Nexity)
  - Energy (EDF, GRDF, SPIE, Energy Pool, Vinci, Dalkia)
  - Transport and mobility (SNCF, Keolis, XPOLogistics, Axxès, Clasqui)
  - Other public services (INSEE, La Poste, Police Headquarters)
- Engineering and digital systems (11,500 jobs)
  - Information and digital technology (DCS Easywear, Intitek, Orange, Bouygues Telecom, Euriware, RFI)
  - Tertiary functions of the industrial sector (Areva, Elkem Silicones, Solvay)
  - Engineering service provider (Egis, Setec, Tractebel, engineering GDF Suez, Artelia, Davidson, Burgeap)
- Traditional business and support services (11,500 jobs)
  - Financial activities (Caisse d'Épargne, BNP Paribas, Agence France Locale, Caisse des impôts, Société Générale, Natixis, BPI France, Banque Populaire)
  - Audit, consulting, juridical advisory and high value added services (Ernst&Young, Adamas, ManPower, Randstad NV, Amaris)
  - Life and non-life insurance (AXA, Klesia, MAAF, April, MMA, Swiss Life)

La Part-Dieu hosts national and regional headquarters of banks (Caisse d’Épargne, Banque Populaire, Banque Rhône-Alpes, Société Générale, etc.), national and regional headquarters of leading consultancy firms (EY, Mc Kinsey, Adamas, and Manpower) and global headquarters of international groups (April Group and Elkem Silicones).

=== Key Figures ===
- 1,150 000 m^{2} of office space
- a flexible offer of 50 to 50,000 m^{2}
- rents from €120 to €320 per m^{2}
- 97% occupancy rate
- 2500 companies
- 2000 hotel rooms and residences from one to four stars
- 20 places for seminars and reunions
- 8 business centres
- available fibre optic network

== Landmarks ==
=== Skyscrapers and high-rise buildings ===
The skyline is being shaped to reflect the Alpine mountain range.

Tour UAP, built in 1974 at 75 m (246 ft), was demolished in 2014 to make way for the 202 m (663 ft) Incity Tower.

Tour EDF, built in 1977 at 82 m (269 ft), was renovated and incorporated into the 129 m (423 ft) Silex² extension in 2021.

Tour M+M was a building constructed in 1972, standing at 55 metres (180.45 ft). It was demolished in 2023 to make way for the M1 building, which is projected to be 55.4 metres (181.76 ft) tall and is expected to be completed in 2026.

Tour Caisse d'Epargne, built in 1976 at 63 m (207 ft), was demolished in 2024, to be replaced by Ki at 50 m (164 ft) in 2026.

Rank	Name	Image	Height m (ft)	Floors	Year	Status	Use	Architect
1	Tour Incity		202 m (663 ft)	39	2015	Built	Office	Albert Constantin Valode & Pistre
2	Tour To-Lyon		170 m (558 ft)	43	2022	Built	Office Hotel	Dominique Perrault Architecture
3	Tour Part-Dieu		165 m (541 ft)	42	1977	Built	Office Hotel	Cossutta & Associates
4	Tour Silex²		129 m (423 ft)	23	2021	Built	Office	Má Architectes Arte Charpentier Architectes
5	Tour Oxygène		115 m (377 ft)	28	2010	Built	Office	Arte Charpentier Architectes
6	Tour Swiss Life		82 m (269 ft)	21	1989	Built	Office	Christian Batton Robert Roustit
7	Le Britannia		57 m (187 ft)	12	1974 (Note: Rehabilitation planned for 2029.)	Built	Office	Claude Monin André Remondet Ivan Seifert
8	Émergence Lafayette		57 m (187 ft)	17	2020	Built	Residential	Itar Architectes Sud Architectes Wilmotte & Associés
9	M1		54.55 m (179 ft)	14	2026	U/C	Mixed	Kohn Pedersen Fox SOHO
10	Sky56		54 m (177 ft)	13	2018	Built	Office	AFAA Chaix & Morel
11	Sky Avenue		50 m (164 ft)	15	2018	Built	Residential	51N4E Christian de Portzamparc Clément Vergély
12	Ki		50 m (164 ft)	15	2026	U/C	Residential	Sou Fujimoto Atelier Paris Dream Exndo
13	6e ART Lafayette		50 m (164 ft)	14	2026	U/R	Residential	Clément Vergely architectes

==== Tour Incity ====
Tour Incity, the tallest structure in Lyon, was designed by Valode & Pistre and AIA architects. The spire, which reaches 202 metres, was installed by helicopter. Around 2,700 employees work across 32 floors and share a single corporate restaurant. In addition, Tour Incity was the first tower in Lyon to obtain the low-energy consumption label, along with HQE and BREEAM Excellent certifications. It was completed in 2016 and currently hosts the regional headquarters Caisse d'Épargne and several branches of the SNCF.

==== Tour To-Lyon ====
A 170-metre office, hotel, and conference tower designed by Dominique Perrault Architecture, located beside the station and Béraudier Plaza, completed in late 2023.

==== Tour Part-Dieu ====
Completed in 1977, this 164-metres-tall building was designed by US-based architecture firm Cossutta & Associates for the main structure and by Stéphane du Château for its pyramid crown. Mainly occupied by office space, it also hosts a four-star Radisson Blu Hotel at the top. Originally named Crédit Lyonnais, it is now called Tour Part-Dieu, but is best known by its nickname, Le Crayon or the Pencil. Its Postmodern style is evident in the terracotta cladding made of pozzolanic sands, imitating the reddish tiles of Lyon, and in the main volume, which echoes the Tour Rose traboule in the Vieux Lyon quarter from French Renaissance.

==== Tour Silex² ====
Silex² is a contemporary 129-metre extension topped with a spire, adjoining an 80-metre Brutalist high-rise dating from the 1970s. It forms part of La Part-Dieu's modernisation plan, replacing the Tour EDF. Designed by Ma Architectes, the building provides larger office floorplates to meet demand and was completed in 2021.

==== Tour Oxygène ====
Tour Oxygène is a 115-metre-tall high-rise crowned by a leaf motif, reflecting the district's tradition of crowning tall buildings, such as Tour Part-Dieu. Its base serves as an extension and direct link to the La Part-Dieu shopping centre, along with an underground car park. Designed by Arte Charpentier Architects and constructed in 2010, Tour Oxygène reflects the dynamism that Lyon has experienced since the early 2000s.

==== Tour Swiss life ====
Tour Swiss Life was designed by Christian Batton and Robert Roustit and completed in 1989. It reaches 82 metres and houses many Swiss Life office spaces. The whole architecture is surrounded by moats and clad by typical late 1980s and early 1990s blue panels. The company launched a project of a 220-metre skyscraper called Swiss Life 2 (formerly Eva), to be built on the existing car park.

=== Other landmarks ===
==== Railway station ====
Originally planned during the 1960s, Part-Dieu railway station opened in 1983 as part of a high speed rail line project between Lyon and Paris. It was designed by Charles Delfante, Michel Macary, Eugène Gachon and Jean-Louis Girodet, and serves as a link between Lyon and Villeurbanne, as its design allows pedestrian traffic beneath concrete rail viaducts. It is underwent major renovation and construction works, as it serves 120,000 travellers and up to 150 high-speed TGV trains per day.

==== Halles de Lyon Paul Bocuse ====
La Part-Dieu covered food market is an international reference for French and Lyonnaise cuisine. Forty-eight merchants (including fishmongers, cheesemakers, bakers and pastry cooks, caterers, wine merchants and restaurateurs) work under the same roof, perpetuating the culinary traditions of Lyon, the gastronomic capital of France. In 1859, the city inaugurated its first indoor food market in Cordeliers, with 19th-century glass and cast-iron architecture easing trade for merchants and customers. In 1971, the new covered market opened in La Part-Dieu. Three decades later, the Halles were brought up to modern safety standards. They now bear the name of Paul Bocuse, the renowned Michelin-starred chef from Lyon. Around 600,000 people visited Les Halles during the 2015 Festival of Lights weekend.

==== Shopping centre ====
La Part-Dieu shopping centre was the largest urban mall in Europe when it opened in 1975. Built on the site of former cavalry barracks, it recalls the past with a car park named Cuirassiers (“Light Cavalry”). The centre has 240 shops and restaurants over five levels and attracts 35 million visitors a year. It also has a 14-screen multiplex cinema. Public transport has reinforced its position as a regional shopping hub. In 2010, the mall underwent a major extension linked to Oxygène Tower. It was later renovated to a design by Winy Maas. Large staircases function as street extensions to the rooftop, which has been converted into a landscaped public space offering panoramic views over the city. Original 1970s concrete-shell patterns have been reused on glass façades to allow natural light into modernised interior spaces.

==== Auditorium Maurice Ravel ====
This concrete structure, named after the Lyon-born composer Maurice Ravel, was designed by architect Henri Pottier, assistant to urban planner Charles Delfante. Although the new auditorium offered an impressive Roman theatre-inspired design, it initially lacked proper acoustics; several renovations have since resolved this. It currently hosts the Orchestre National de Lyon and houses a large organ from the former Trocadéro Palace, built for the 1878 Exposition Universelle.

==== Bourse du Travail theatre ====
The Bourse du Travail theatre was constructed between 1929 and 1936 in Art Deco style by Charles Meysson, chief architect of Lyon. Its façade is decorated with a large 1934 mosaic created by 35 mosaicists, based on a design by painter Fernand Fargeot, depicting “the city embellished by labour”, hence its name, “Labour Exchange” or Bourse du Travail. The interior features plasterwork and painted murals inspired by socialist realism.

==== Municipal Library ====
In July 1966, Mayor Louis Pradel initiated an experiment to create a “library of the future”. Covering 27,000 square metres across three levels, the building is organised into areas dedicated respectively to public reading, study, and research. A silo houses all historical documents from the former municipal library. The library is accessible to both university researchers and secondary school students. During the 1980s, its collections and services underwent large-scale computerisation. An entrance connecting the building to the train station plaza was only opened in the late 2000s. The library is currently undergoing renovation.

==== City and Departmental Archives ====
The City and Departmental Archives were established in Lyon following the French Revolution. Until 2014, documents from the Ancien Régime were stored in the vaults of the Hôtel de Ville. In that year, the collections were relocated to a new facility in La Part-Dieu, designed by Dumetier Design, Gautier-Conquet, and Séquences. The building, clad in golden panels and designed to meet high security standards, contains a consultation room that houses an extensive collection of maps (both public administrative and private), notarial records, and documents from the historical municipal library, dating from 861 to the present day.

==== Lyon Metropolis headquarters ====
The headquarters of Lyon Metropolis were constructed between 1976 and 1978 by René Gimbert and Jacques Vergély in the Brutalist style. Four large, square pier foundations support the suspended structure, which also serve as lift shafts. Above them, four interlocking concrete boxes form a crown. The mirrored curtain walls reflect the surrounding urban environment.

==== Montluc Fort and Prison museum ====
Montluc Fort was built in 1831, during the reign of Louis-Philippe, as part of Lyon's defensive belt, intended to protect the city from foreign invasions, particularly those by Prussia. In 1926, the fort was converted into Montluc prison. During the Vichy Regime, it served as a major centre for the deportation of Jewish people and as a prison for members of the French Resistance; Jean Moulin and Marc Bloch were among those incarcerated there. The site became a civilian prison in 1947 and was converted into a museum in 2010.

==== Church of Blessed "Saint" Sacrement ====
Inaugurated in 1905, the Church of the Blessed Sacrament combines Gothic and Byzantine styles. It was designed by Louis Sainte-Marie-Perrin, architect of the Basilica of Notre-Dame de Fourvière, although its bell tower remains unfinished. The church was originally intended to promote Christian values in a working-class district noted at the time for high poverty levels and low baptism rates. It has recently been incorporated into a Catholic school complex designed by the AFAA architectural firm.

==== Garibaldi swimming pool ====
The Garibaldi Swimming Pool became Lyon's first indoor public swimming pool when it opened in 1933. Designed by architect C. Colliard and engineer Camille Chalumeau in the Art Deco style, it was constructed in only a few months.

== Transportation ==
La Part-Dieu is one of Lyon's principal transportation hubs, encompassing :

- a high-speed, regional, national, international and freight railway stationoffering:
  - Regional TER Auvergne-Rhône-Alpes services to Grenoble, Saint-Étienne, Clermont-Ferrand, Valence, Roanne, Bourg-en-Bresse, Chambéry and Annecy, and Geneva
  - National TER, Intercités and TGV services to major French cities including Paris, Marseille, Toulouse, Nice, Nantes, Montpellier, Strasbourg, Lille, Rennes, Le Havre, Dijon, Nîmes, Tours, Perpignan and Rouen.
  - International high-speed TGV services to major European destinations such as Monaco and Brussels (SNCF), Geneva (Lyria during summer or TER), Barcelona (AVE), Frankfurt (DB-SNCF TGV) and Turin and Milan (Trenitalia), with journey times ranging from two to six hours.
- Direct access to Lyon-Saint-Exupéry International Airport and high-speed rail station, in under 30 minutes via the Rhônexpress tramway, offering flights to over 120 international destinations.
- Lyon Métro line
- Tramway lines, and
- Local bus and trolleybus lines (C1, C2, C3, C7, C13, 25, 37, 38 and 70)
- Regional bus services to northern Isère (T36 and X75)
- A main coach station on Place de Francfort
- Public bicycle-sharing stations
- Taxi stands and drop-off zones
- A car hire facility and parking area
- Four large public car parks
- Major city arteries including Cours Lafayette, Rue Garibaldi, Cours Gambetta, Avenue Thiers and, Boulevard Vivier-Merle
- Four road tunnels facilitating urban traffic flow (Vivier-Merle, Bonnel, Brotteaux and Servient)
- Access to major European and National motorways, including the A6, A7 and E15 autoroutes near Perrache as well as Lyon's ring roads, within 20 minutes.
- The historic city centre (Presqu’île) within 10 minutes by public transport, car or bicycle.

== Education ==
La Part-Dieu is home to several private educational institutions, including ISG and MBway Business Schools, the Institut Polytechnique des Sciences Avancées (aeronautics and aerospace) and Sup'Biotech (biotechnology) engineering colleges.

== La Part-Dieu 2030 ==
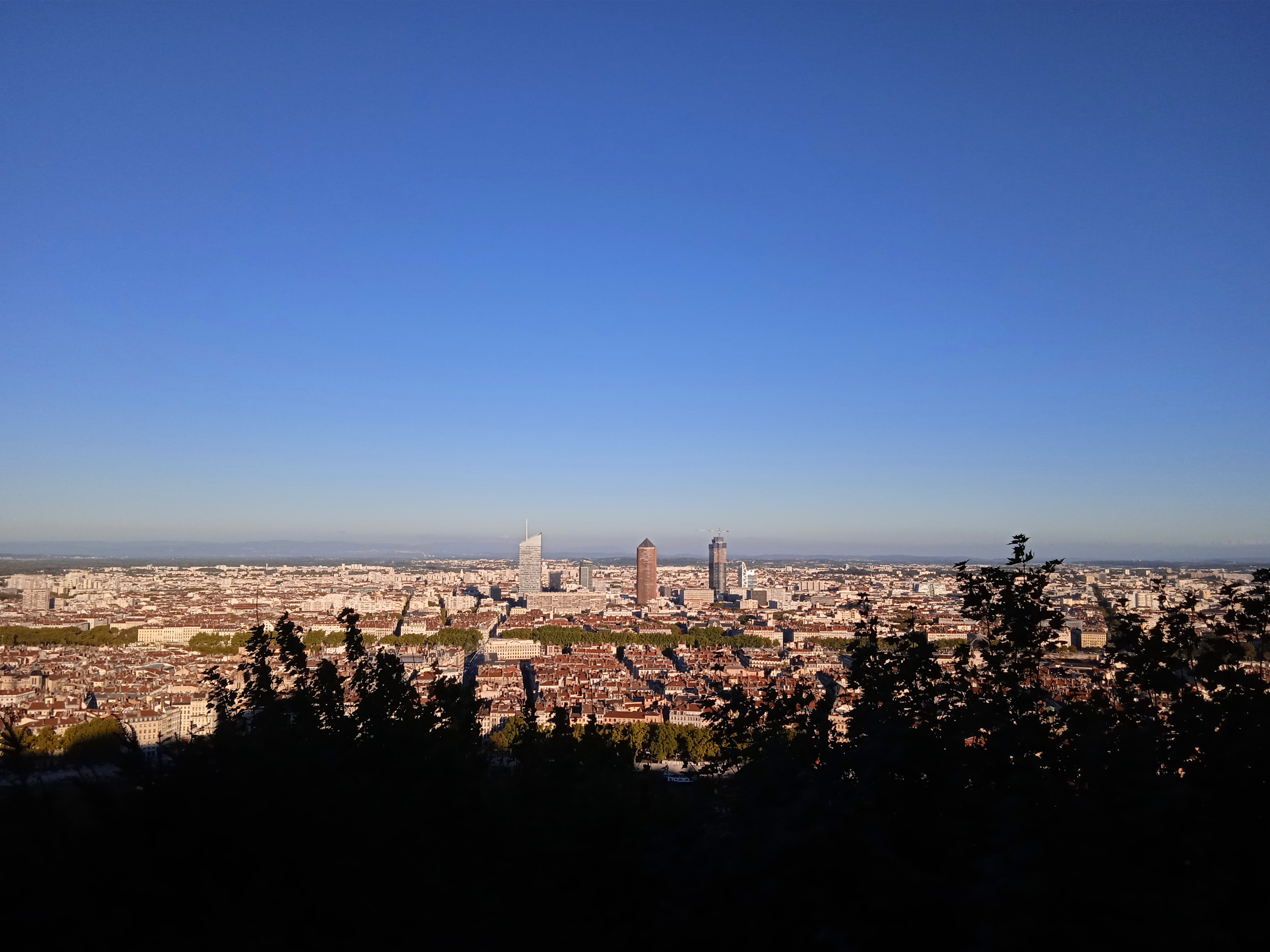
Lyon and the Part-Dieu district seen from Fourvière in October 2022, with the To-Lyon tower under construction on the right

=== Presentation of the project ===
Since the 2010s, La Part-Dieu has been undergoing a major redevelopment. In 2014, Lyon Metropolis launched an extensive urban renewal programme in collaboration with the publicly owned local development corporation Société Publique Locale La Part-Dieu (SPL) and the AUC architecture firm. The total public and private investment is estimated at €2.5 billion.

=== Main objectives ===
The La Part-Dieu 2030 project seeks to preserve the district's twentieth-century architectural heritage. It aims to modernise office space provision, stimulate economic growth, and integrate the district more effectively into the city's urban fabric and transport network. and with a strong focus on designing pleasurable residential and public spaces. A further goal is to enhance the quality of residential and public spaces, in line with contemporary French urban living standards on a European scale. Main objectives consist of :

- Restore and preserve the architectural heritage of the 1960s and 1970s, ensuring that new developments—including Tour Incity—are consistent with the district's established style of repetitive, retro-futuristic, mineral-patterned design.
- Expand and modernise the tertiary sector by renovating older buildings and constructing new, diversified facilities for offices, housing, and public amenities to support economic growth.
- Strengthen the district's role as a transport hub and gateway to the metropolis by enlarging the railway station, creating new public spaces, and improving pedestrian and multi-modal connectivity.
- Create a lively urban district by introducing ground-floor shops and services along high-footfall streets, and promoting leisure, cultural, and sporting activities for all ages throughout the week.

=== Completed projects ===
- Office space
  - Tour Incity
  - Tour To-Lyon
  - Silex¹
  - Silex²
  - Sky56
  - Orange campus
  - The 107
  - Rue Deruelle
  - Aprilium 2
  - Velum
  - Equinox
  - Terralta
  - Le Rephael
  - Carsat 2
  - Edison
  - Green Part-Dieu
  - Etoile Part-Dieu
  - Crystallin
  - Lafayette
  - Viaterra / Vianova
  - Next
  - New age
  - Corner
  - Primatvera
- Cultural space
  - City and Department Archives
  - Shopping centre
  - Les Halles Carpark
  - Saint-Sacrement school
  - Léon Jouhaux school
- Residential space
  - Bricks
  - Émergence Lafayette
  - Sky Avenue
  - Brottier residence
  - Barre Desaix renovation
- Infrastructure
  - New Railway station
  - Garibaldi street redesign
  - Boulevard Vivier Merle tunnels
  - Place de Francfort redesign
  - New car rental parking lot
  - 1,500-space bicycle station
- Urban works
  - Mandela Park
  - Transformation of Boulevard Vivier-Merle
  - Construction of underground air-cooling facility to power district air-conditioning systems

=== Projects under construction ===
- Ki by Sou Fujimoto Atelier, Dream Paris, and EXNDO for a 50-metre mixed-use tower with office and residential space, street-level retail, and green rooftops, replacing the former Caisse d’Épargne headquarters near Tour Oxygène, constructed using reclaimed materials.
- The Francfort Hotel by AIA Architectes, to be completed by 2027, will be 30 meters tall.
- Vejjo offices
- Audessa /Vertuo offices
- Manufacture housing

=== Proposed projects ===
- Skyscraper projects:
  - Swiss Life 2, developed by Swiss Life, projected for completion in 2025 (200 m or 656 ft).
  - Tour M + M, developed by DCB International and designed by Kohn Pedersen Fox, projected for completion in 2030 (215 m or 705 ft)
  - Milan Plaza, as set out in the AUC masterplan, comprising several residential towers around Place de Milan (200 m or 656 ft)
- High-rise projects:
  - Cité administrative redesign
  - France TV redesign
  - Central Part-Dieu apartments
- Infrastructure projects:
  - Extension of Lyon Métro Line E to La Part-Dieu
  - Greater Lyon rail bypass (CFAL) to reduce congestion at La Part-Dieu station
  - Construction of an underground railway station

== See also ==
- Central Business District
- List of tallest buildings in France
- Lyon Metropolis
- Lyon Métro
- Lyon tramway
- Lyon Fortified Belts
- Lyon
- 3rd arrondissement of Lyon
- Lyon-Part-Dieu railway station
- Tour Incity
- Tour Part-Dieu
- Auditorium Maurice Ravel
- Bourse du Travail Theatre
- Westfield La Part-Dieu shopping mall
- Montluc Fort
