= Tour To-Lyon =

Apicil Tower
- The Apicil Tower in February 2024.
- Interactive map of the Apicil Tower area

General information
- Status: Completed
- Type: Mixed-use (office, hotel, retail)
- Location: La Part-Dieu, Lyon, France
- Coordinates: 45.7596°N 4.8589°E
- Construction started: 2019
- Completed: 2023
- Cost: €600 million

Height
- Roof: 171 m (561 ft)

Technical details
- Floor count: 43
- Floor area: 80,000 m^{2} (860,000 sq ft)

Design and construction
- Architect: Dominique Perrault
- Developer: Vinci Immobilier

Tour To-Lyon is a mixed-use skyscraper in the La Part-Dieu business district of Lyon, France. The building include 66,000 m^{2} of office space, 10,500 m^{2} of hotel space and 3,500 m^{2} of retail space. With a height of 170 m, it became the second-tallest skyscraper in Lyon after Tour Incity (202 m) completed in 2015.

On 5 September 2019, Apicil Group who occupes 20,000 m^{2} of the tower announced a deal with the developer of the project Vinci Immobilier to acquire the totality of the office space (66,000 m^{2}) for an estimated price of €500 million.

On 9 September 2019 Vinci Immobilier in the presence of Gerard Collomb the Mayor of Lyon, Dominique Perrault the architect and Philippe Barret CEO of Apicil Group officially launched the tower project with a symbolic laying of the building's foundation stone.
