= ICICI Lombard =

Indian General Insurance Company

ICICI Lombard General Insurance Company Ltd
- Type: Public
- Traded as: BSE: 540716; NSE: ICICIGI
- Industry: Financial services
- Founded: 2001; 25 years ago
- Headquarters: Mumbai, Maharashtra, India
- Key people: Sanjeev Mantri (Managing Director and CEO)
- Products: General insurance Health insurance Vehicle insurance Travel insurance Home insurance Crop insurance Business insurance
- Revenue: ▲₹30,618 crore (US$3.2 billion) (2026)
- Operating income: ▲₹2,524 crore (US$260 million) (2026)
- Net income: ▲₹2,772 crore (US$290 million) (2026)
- Total assets: ▲₹58,421 crore (US$6.1 billion) (2026)
- Total equity: ▲₹14,130 crore (US$1.5 billion) (2026)
- Number of employees: 15,231 (2026)
- Parent: ICICI Bank
- Website: www.icicilombard.com

ICICI Lombard General Insurance Company Limited is an Indian general insurance company headquartered in Mumbai, Maharashtra. ICICI is engaged with general insurance, reinsurance, insurance claims management and investment management.

The company has a Gross Written Premium of ₹306.18 billion (FY2026). It offers policy insurance and renewal through its intermediaries and website. It markets assurance products including Car Insurance, Health Insurance, International Travel Insurance, Overseas Student Travel Insurance, Two Wheeler Insurance, Home Insurance and Weather Insurance.

== History ==
Founded in 2001, ICICI Lombard General Insurance Company is a joint venture between ICICI Bank- India’s second-largest bank, and Fairfax Financial Holdings Limited- a financial services company based in Toronto. ICICI Bank had 64% stake in the venture while Fairfax had 36% in the joint venture. ICICI Lombard General Insurance is the largest private-sector general insurance company in India.

In a 2016 fiscal, ICICI Bank sold a 9.0% stake in ICICI General to its joint venture partner, Fairfax Financial Holdings, at a company valuation of ₹172.25 billion (equivalent to ₹270 billion or US$2.8 billion in 2026). Following the transaction, the share ownership in ICICI Lombard General Insurance Company of ICICI Bank and Fairfax Financial Holdings Limited is approximately 64% and 35%, respectively. On 16th October 2019, FAL Corporation, part of Fairfax Financial Holdings, exited ICICI Lombard General Insurance Company Ltd. by selling shares, which at the time were worth nearly ₹2,627 crore (equivalent to ₹36 billion or US$370 million in 2026)

ICICI Lombard General Insurance Company partnered with Karur Vysya Bank to sell bancassurance products in 2019.

In August 2020, ICICI Lombard General Insurance Company acquired Bharti Axa General Insurance , through a share swap deal. The deal enabled Bharti AXA's current shareholders to receive 2 shares of ICICI Lombard for every 115 shares of Bharti AXA held. The merger resulted in a combined annual premiums, worth ₹16,447 crore (US$1.7 billion).

ICICI Lombard General Insurance Company has 13,670 employees, 312 branches(2024) 840 virtual offices (Note: Details on the number of virtual offices detailed in Performance Review (refer page #7) of ICICI Lombard for Financial year 2020 conducted by the parent company ICICI Bank Ltd.) spread across India.

== Financials ==
ICICI Lombard's Gross Written Premium was ₹306.18 billion (US$3.2 billion) in the 2026 fiscal year. ICICI Lombard had the second highest industry market share of 8.30 percent in the general insurance market as of February 2022. ICICI Lombard’s profit before tax increased from ₹16.83 billion in fiscal 2022 to ₹21.12 billion in fiscal 2023. ICICI Lombard’s profit after tax increased from ₹12.71 billion in fiscal 2022 to ₹17.29 billion in fiscal 2023.
