= 3rd arrondissement of Lyon =

- Municipal arrondissement
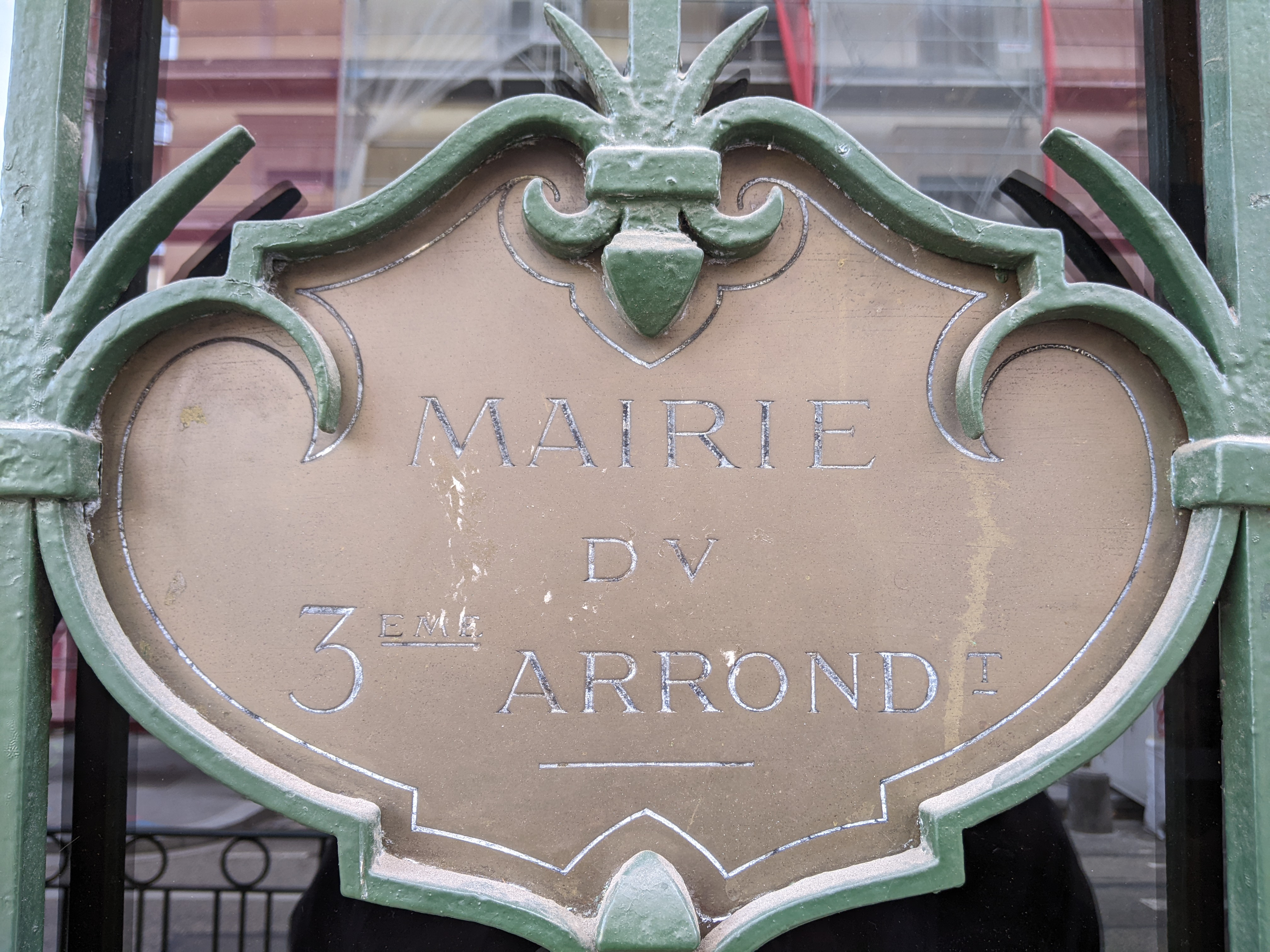
- Plaque at the mairie of the 3rd arrondissement

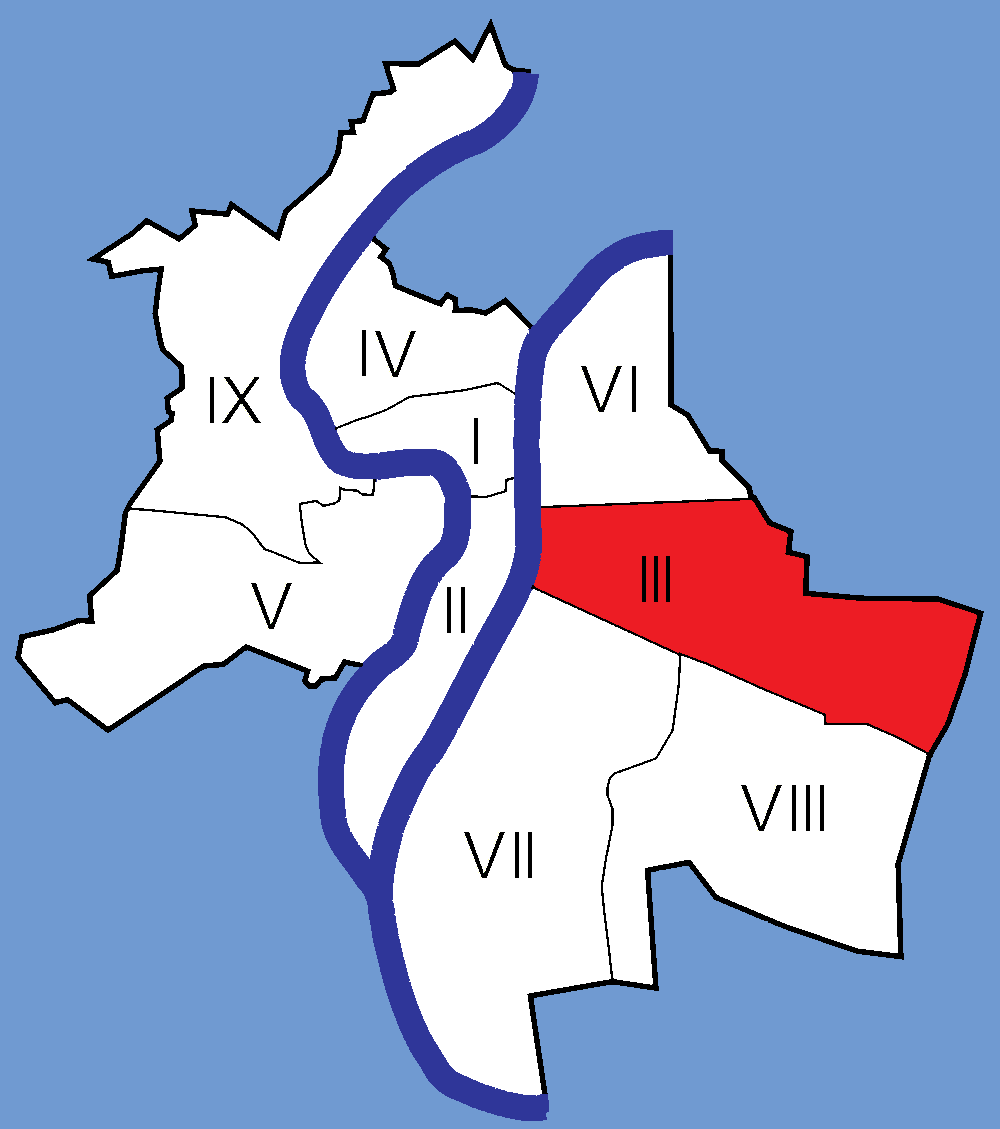
- Location within Lyon
- Coordinates: 45°45′31″N 4°51′21″E
- Country: France
- Region: Auvergne-Rhône-Alpes
- Department: Lyon Metropolis
- Commune: Lyon

Government
  - Mayor (2020–2026): Véronique Dubois-Bertrand (EELV)
- Area: 6.35 km^{2} (2.45 sq mi)
- Population (2023): 100,679
  - Density: 15,900/km^{2} (41,100/sq mi)
- INSEE code: 69383

The nine arrondissements of Lyon

Arrondissements of Lyon

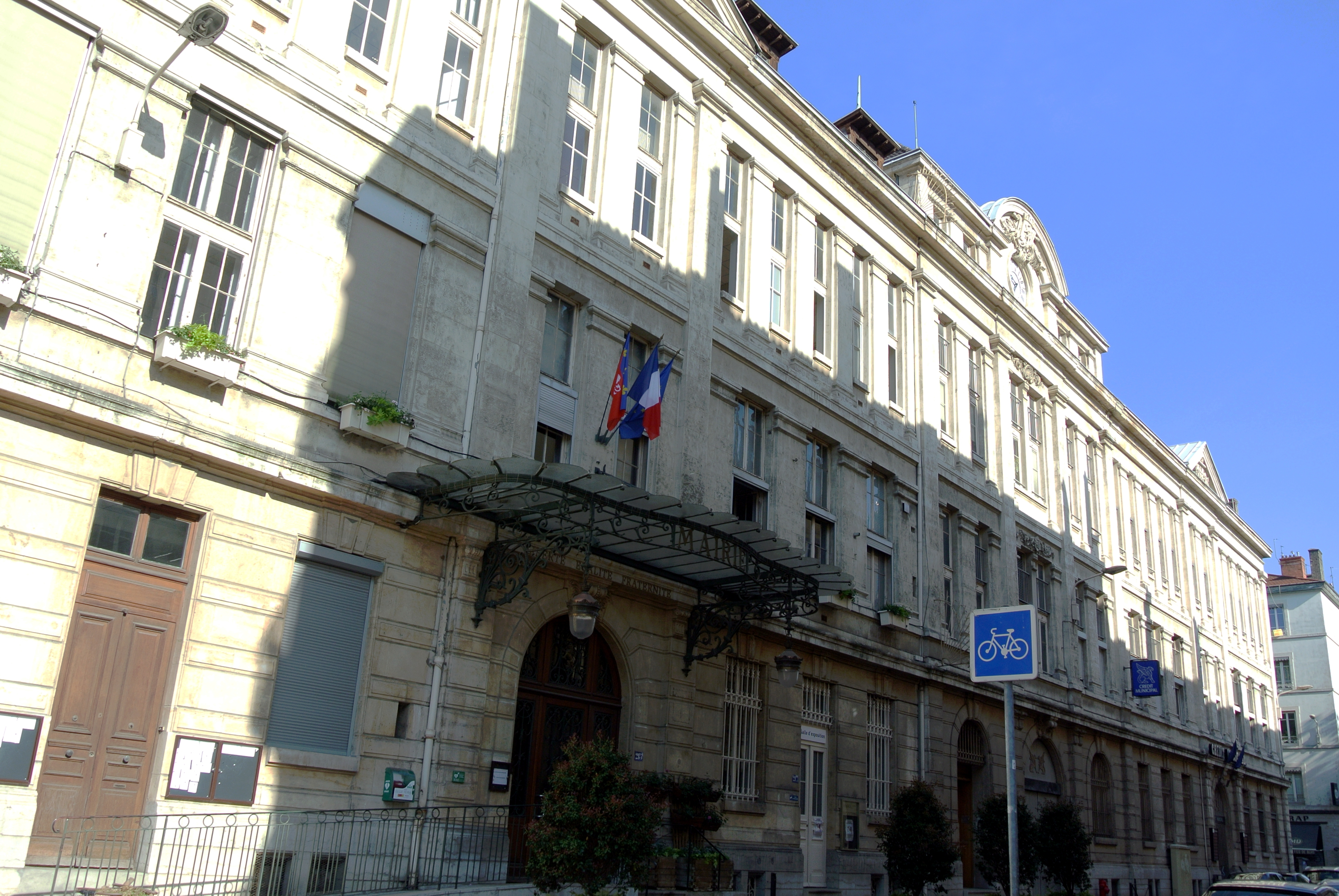
Western facade of the town hall of the 3rd arrondissement

The 3rd arrondissement of Lyon (French: 3^{e} arrondissement de Lyon) is one of the nine arrondissements of the City of Lyon.

== Demography ==
- 2006: 88,755 inhabitants
- 2007: 89,000 inhabitants

It is the most populous arrondissement of Lyon and the second most densely populated after the 1st arrondissement of Lyon.

- Relative density : 13,003 inhabitants per square kilometre (33,680/sq mi)

=== History ===
The 3rd arrondissement was created by the Decree of 24 March 1852 (date of creation of the first five arrondissements). The text of 17 July 1867 the district has shared in two by creating the 6th arrondissement of Lyon. Then the 3rd district found its current limits, after it was split again when the 7th arrondissement of Lyon has been established (Text 8 March 1912).

== Area ==
- 635 ha (1,570 acres)

=== Quarters ===
The quarters of the 3rd arrondissement are :

- la Part-Dieu
- la Villette
- Montchat
- The north part of la Guillotière

Montchat is delimited at the North by the route de Genas, at the East by the Vinatier street and boulevard Pinel, at the south Sud by the Rockefeller Avenue, the place d’Arsonval and the cours Albert Thomas and at the West by the rue Feuillat.

=== Monuments and buildings ===
- Grand Temple de Lyon
- Tour Part-Dieu, called « Le Crayon »
- Tour Oxygène
- Tour Incity (project)
- Tour Swiss Life

=== Street and places ===
- Avenue de Saxe
- Rue de Créqui
- Rue de Vendôme
- Rue Duguesclin
- Rue Garibaldi

=== Gardens and parks ===
- Parc Bazin
- Parc Chambovet
- Parc Sisley
- Jardin de la Place Bir Hakeim
- Jardin Saint-Marie Perrin
- Square Jussieu

=== Transports ===
- Lyon Metro Line B Stations served : "Part-Dieu", "Place Guichard", "Saxe-Gambetta"
- Lyon Metro Line D stations served : "Saxe-Gambetta", "Garibaldi", "Sans-Souci", "Montplaisir-Lumière", "Grange-Blanche"
- Tramway T1 et T3

=== Schools and universities ===
- Ecole maternelle et Primaire
- Molière, Collège public
- Lacassagne, Collège public
- Gilbert Dru, Collège public
- Professeur Dargent, Collège public
- Raoul Dufy, Collège public
- Bon Secours, Collège privé
- Charles de Foucauld, Collège privé
- Ampère-Saxe, Lycée public
- Lacassagne, Lycée public
- Charles de Foucauld, Lycée privé
- Montesquieu, Lycée privé

=== Sportive equipments ===
- Stade Marc-Vivien Foé
- Stade Eugénie
- Gymnase Charial
- Gymnase Francisque Anselme
- Gymnase Mazenod
- Gymnase Rebatel
- Patinoire Baraban
- Piscine Charial (hiver)
- Piscine Garibaldi (hiver)

=== Cultural equipments ===
- Auditorium Maurice-Ravel
- Bourse du Travail
- Bibliothèque municipale de la Part-Dieu
- Archives départementales du Rhône (section moderne : archives postérieures à 1800)
- Théâtre de la Tête d'Or

=== Notable people ===
- Pauline Lafont (philanthropist)
- Marcelle Lafont
- Rayan Cherki

== Administration ==
Mayors

- 2001-2008 : Patrick Huguet (UMP)
- 2008-2018 : Thierry Philip (PS)
- 2018-2020 : Catherine Panassier (MD)
- 2020-2024 : Véronique Dubois-Bertrand (EELV)
- 2024-today : Marion Sessiecq (EELV)

== See also ==
- Arrondissements of Lyon
