= Tour Swiss Life =

Coordinates: 45°45′47″N 4°51′31″E

- Interactive map of the Tour Swiss Life area

General information
- Status: Completed
- Type: Office
- Location: La Part-Dieu, Lyon, France
- Completed: 1990

Height
- Roof: 82 m (269 ft)
- Top floor: 82 m (269 ft)

Technical details
- Floor count: 21
- Floor area: 16.600 m^{2} (178.68 sq ft)
- Lifts/elevators: 6

Design and construction
- Architects: Christian Batton, cabinet Batton-Roustit

The Tour Swiss Life is a skyscraper of offices located in La Part-Dieu quarter, in the 3rd arrondissement of Lyon. This 82-metre tower was built in 1989 by French architect Charles Delfante. It was the second tallest tower in Lyon before the end of the construction of the Tour Oxygène in 2010, and is now the 4th tallest, with 20 floors. The tower was originally to be about 120 metres, but the City Council was opposed to highrises at the time. It is surrounded by a ditch and has its ground floor at level -1, the entrance is via a gateway. It houses in particular the Swiss Life company. At the MIPIM exhibition in 2009, the Mayor of Lyon, Gérard Collomb confirmed the desire of Swiss Life to raise the tower. The project has since been modified, a new tower has been proposed to be built in place of the current 4-storey-high parking garage of SwissLife tower.
