= Tour Part-Dieu =

Skyscraper in Lyon, France

- View of the Tour Part-Dieu in 2023.

- Location within France

General information
- Status: Completed
- Type: office, hotel
- Location: La Part-Dieu, Lyon, France
- Coordinates: 45°45′40″N 4°51′13″E
- Opening: 1977

Height
- Antenna spire: 165 m (541 ft)
- Top floor: 165 m (541 ft)

Technical details
- Floor count: 42
- Lifts/elevators: 20

Design and construction
- Architect: Cossutta & Associates

The Tour Part-Dieu (formerly Tour du Crédit Lyonnais, or colloquially Le Crayon, or The Pencil) is a skyscraper in Lyon, France. The building is 164.9 metres (541 ft) tall, in La Part-Dieu district, with 42 floors. The building was completed in 1977. It currently stands as the thirteenth-tallest building in France and is the tallest outside of Paris. The top 10 floors are occupied by Radisson Blu Hotel Lyon, the highest hotel in Europe. The other floors are offices.

It is a work of the American firm Araldo Cossutta & Associates and the construction occurred between 1972 and 1977. According to the wishes of the architect, the roof of this tower is roughly the same height as Notre Dame de Fourviere. At the opening in 1977, it was the 4th tallest building in France. The tower has a cylindrical shape. It is topped by a 23-metre high pyramid.

On the occasion of its 31st anniversary, the tower changed its name and logo. On 22 September 2008, the building was officially renamed Tour Part-Dieu.

The tower is fondly named Le Crayon ("The Pencil") by the Lyonnese due to its shape, and the new logo includes this nickname.

The tower is served by the Gare Part-Dieu–Vivier Merle station on the metro line.

== History ==
As part of the implementation of Part-Dieu central business district, it was decided to build an office tower to "signal the presence of the district" and "materialize the virtual axis composition that is imagines extended east to Skyscraper of Villeurbanne". The tower was inaugurated in 1977. This construction has proved disastrous economically and hindered the development of the whole area during the ten years since its inauguration.

== Technical details ==
Each floor covers 1,115 square metres (12,000 sq ft) surface for a total area of 37,000 square metres (400,000 sq ft). An underground parking area on two floors provides 224 car spaces. The main entrance of the tower is located on the esplanade of the La Part-Dieu shopping center, while the entrance of the hotel is located at the ground floor, on Rue Servient.

== Today ==
Ground-level view of Tour Part-Dieu

The last ten floors are occupied by a Radisson Blu Hotel. The lobby is on the 32nd floor, and is accessible by express elevators directly from the ground floor to the 32nd floor. There is a restaurant on the 32nd floor which provides 360° views over Lyon. Above that floor, the hotel is hollowed on the last 10 floors; the rooms are around a circled corridor to form a central shaft which is lit by the roof pyramid.

There are 20 elevators (lifts), provided by Schindler, which include:

- two high-speed express elevators from the ground floor to the 32nd floor. They travel at 5 m/s.
- two hotel elevators, from the 32nd floor to the 42nd floor.
- four service elevators, two of which are serving all the floors from B2 to 42nd floor.
- ten elevators for the office part, serves each floor from B2 to 31st floor.

Currently, the tower is the second-tallest building in Greater Lyon after the Tour Incity, which will stand at 202 metres (663 ft).

The Tour Oxygène, completed in 2010, stands just below these two towers, at 120 meters. On the first four floors, a new 15,000-square-metre (160,000 sq ft) commercial area was delivered with the tower, and is linked with the La Part-Dieu shopping mall.

== In popular culture ==
Besides its nickname "the pencil", the tower has inspired several items including a chocolate version. It is composed of black chocolate, more than 70% of cocoa of maraschino (bitter cherry liqueur), candied cherries and milk chocolate.

It also appeared on the front of postcards of the city, but also a form of humorous newspaper and magazine or on the local Little Paumé, for the tower forming part of the city became one of its most representative monuments.

In his song "Lyon Presqu'île" on the album The Superb, Benjamin Biolay (born in Villefranche-sur-Saône) includes "round in pen" in his view of the main monuments of the city.

== See also ==
- Tour Incity
- Tour Oxygène
- Lyon Dubai City
