= April Group =

French insurance company

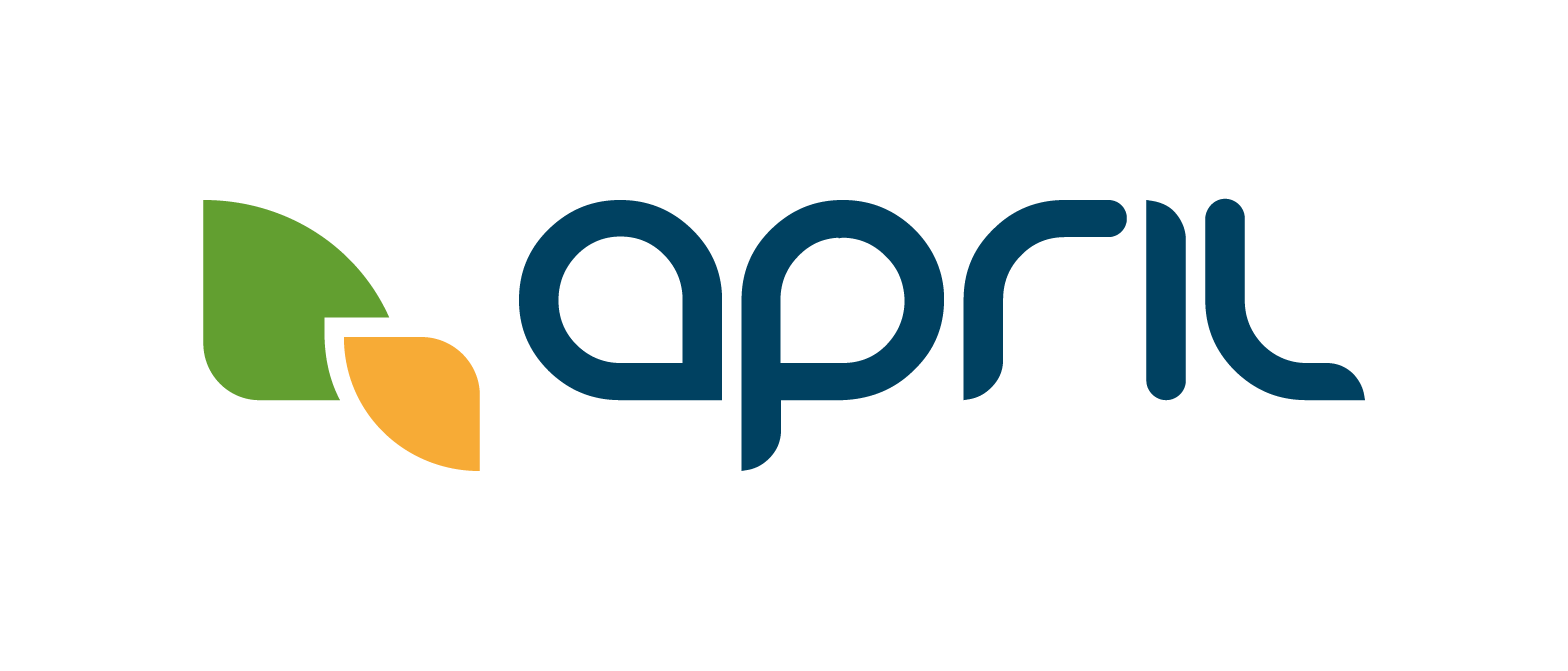
- Industry: insurance
- Founded: 1988; 38 years ago
- Headquarters: Lyon, France
- Key people: Bruno Rousset (founder), Eric Maumy (CEO)
- Products: Health insurance Personal protection insurance Property and casualty insurance Borrower insurance International health insurance Insurance for professionals and SMEs; Two-wheeler insurance Construction insurance Real estate insurance Pleasure boating insurance Wealth management
- Revenue: €907 million (2025)
- Number of employees: 3,300
- Website: https://www.april.com/en/

April Group is a French insurance Managing General Agent company (wholesale broker), headquartered in Lyon, France.

It designs, manages and distributes insurance and financing services for individuals, professionals and businesses.

It offers its customers and partners health and personal protection for individuals, professionals and SMEs, loan insurance, international medical insurance, property and casualty niche insurance, two-wheeler insurance and wealth management.

Established in 1988 and based in Lyon, April has 3,300 employees whose activity covers 25 countries, and produced a turnover of €907m in 2025.

== History ==
=== Founding ===
Bruno Rousset founded the insurance broker April in Lyon in 1988. At the time of its creation, the company had a network of 500 independent brokers distributing the insurance products designed by April, which soon rose to over 800 by the end of the year.

=== Growth and Initial Public Offering ===
By introducing third party administration (which became Aglae in 1988) and making its first acquisitions (CPA Vie, Cetim), APRIL broadened its scope, becoming an insurer, diversified its range, and became a network.

The company grew rapidly, diversifying its offering in health insurance, personal protection, borrower insurance, and certain specialised segments of property and casualty insurance, as well as international health insurance for expatriates.

The APRIL group went public (Second Marché of the Paris stock exchange) on 23 October 1997. The company had then developed to a network of 8,000 brokers and insurance agents and had recorded several years of annual growth of 30%.

The 2000s saw significant European expansion, notably in Europe, North America and Asia, by creating subsidiaries and acquiring local companies.

=== Acquisition by CVC Capital Partners ===
In 2019, APRIL, Evolem and CVC Capital Partners announced they had agreed to transfer Evolem's stakes (which represented 65.13% of APRIL's capital) to Andromeda Investissements, a buyout company controlled by funds managed by CVC Capital Partners, in which Evolem and APRIL's management held a minority stake. A new executive committee was set up, led by Eric Maumy, and a new strategic plan put in place as early as 2020 to spur on the group's transformation.

The strategic plan defined following this acquisition led the company to divest activities that were no longer considered priorities, such as risk carrying, and to invest in the digitalisation of its activities and services. In particular, April acquired the insurance comparison platform Comparadise in 2020 and sold its subsidiary Axéria Prévoyance, specialised in risk carrying, to Malakoff Humanis in 2021.

=== Acquisition by KKR and new strategy ===
In November 2022, the American investment firm KKR signed an agreement to acquire the group, with the aim of strengthening the digitalisation and internationalisation of its activities. April had then recorded three consecutive years of 10% growth excluding acquisitions. The transaction, completed in April 2023, made KKR the majority shareholder, alongside April’s management, employees and other long-term shareholders.

In 2022, April opened two new offices, in Germany, in Cologne, and in the United Arab Emirates, in Dubai.

In 2023, April acquired Belgian company Expat & Co and launched a direct billing payment solution called Easy Claim card.

In 2024, April acquired DLPK, a group specialising in savings and wealth management, as part of a diversification strategy. The transaction represented €15 billion in assets under management.

In 2025, April announce a partnership with Somco in tha Asia and Pacific region to distribute international private medical insurance, starting from Singapore.

In 2026, April expands its activities in the Middle East by partnering with local players to launch operations in Abu Dhabi (United Arab Emirates) and Qatar. In September, April acquires Alexis Assurances to strengthen its property and casualty (P&C) insurance division.

== Activities ==
April designs insurance, savings and wealth management products and markets them through a network of brokers, numbering around 30,000 worldwide, and wealth management advisers, numbering around 2,800.

It manages these products notably through digital platforms and technological tools used for customer relations, contract management and claims handling.

April’s main products are in the fields of health and personal protection insurance for individuals and businesses of all sizes, loan insurance, international health insurance, insurance for specific risks, including construction, motor, two-wheeler, pleasure boating and real estate, as well as savings and wealth management.

== Key figures ==
The company operates in 25 countries, has 3,300 employees and reported revenue of €907 million in 2025, 26% of which was generated outside France. In the same year, it managed €17 billion in assets under management.
