= La Part-Dieu (shopping mall) =

Major shopping mall in Lyon, France

Westfield La Part-Dieu
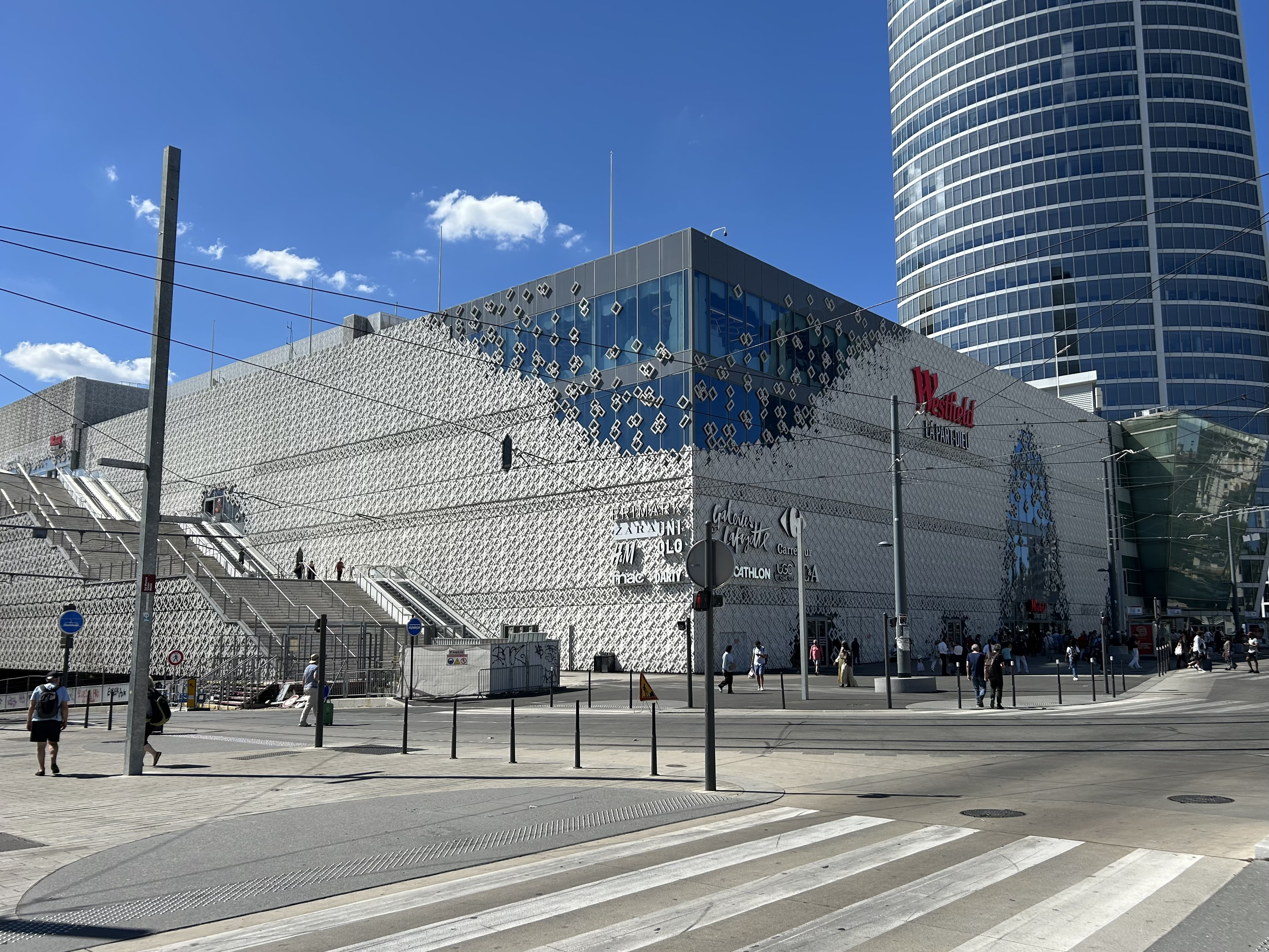
- The main entrance on the Boulevard Vivier-Merle in 2026.
- Location: La Part-Dieu, Lyon (3rd arrondissement), France
- Coordinates: 45°45′41″N 4°51′21″E
- Opened: 8 September 1975
- Owner: Unibail-Rodamco-Westfield
- Num. of stores: 267
- Floor area: 127,300 m^{2} (1,370,000 sq ft); Full area: 247,000 m^{2} (2,660,000 sq ft)
- Floors: 5
- Parking: 4,301 spaces
- Public transit: Lyon-Part-Dieu station Gare Part-Dieu–Vivier Merle; Part-Dieu–Auditorium Gare Part-Dieu–Villette (cross the SNCF railway station)
- Website: fr.westfield.com/lapartdieu/

Westfield La Part-Dieu is a major shopping mall located in the business district of La Part-Dieu, in the 3rd arrondissement of Lyon, France. It used to be one of Europe's largest downtown shopping center when it opened on 8 September 1975.

The mall is located at a major public transit hub including Lyon Part-Dieu railway station (the busiest in France outside Paris), métro line B, tramway lines T1, T3 and T4 as well as the Rhônexpress rail link to the airport and TGV station of Lyon Saint-Exupéry.

Renovation works have been done from 2017 to 2023 according to a Winy Maas overhaul design.

== History ==
In 2010, its size was increased by 11,000 m^{2} (120,000 sq ft) (25 shops) with a new zone named Cours Oxygène and built at the same time as the Tour Oxygène.

From 2017 to 2023, the complete shopping mall was in renovation, including the creation of new bigger entrances, the renovation of the outside appearance, and an extension of 32,000 m^{2} (340,000 sq ft) on the new west part, which was until 2016 a four-level car park. This new zone of the shopping center hosts the new relocated UGC cinemas, 40 new shops, and 24 new restaurants in a zone named The Dining Experience.

== Gallery ==
Rue Servient and tram line T1 both pass under the mall building.

== See also ==
- La Part-Dieu
