= 9th arrondissement of Lyon =

- Municipal arrondissement
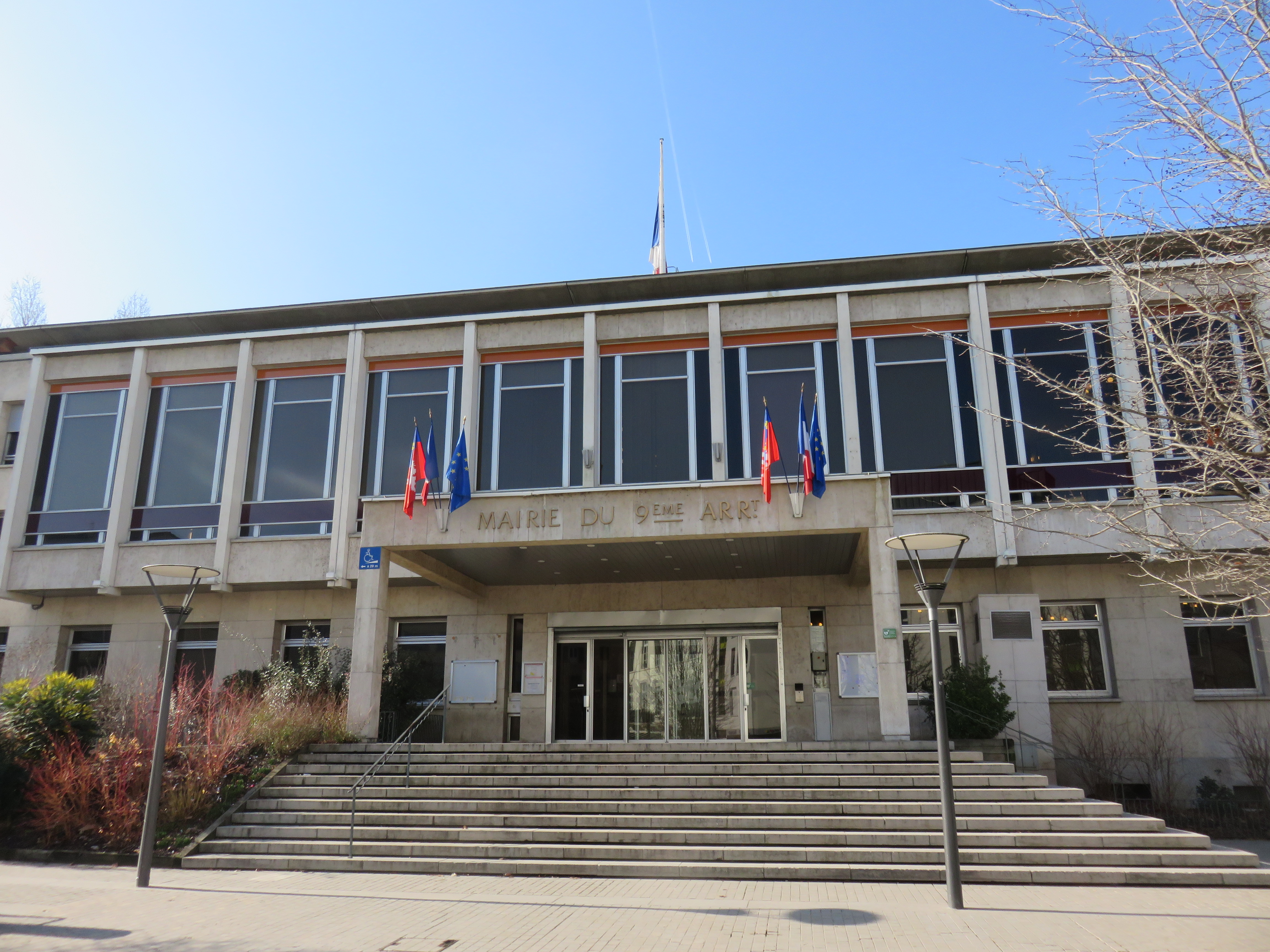
- Mairie of the 9th arrondissement

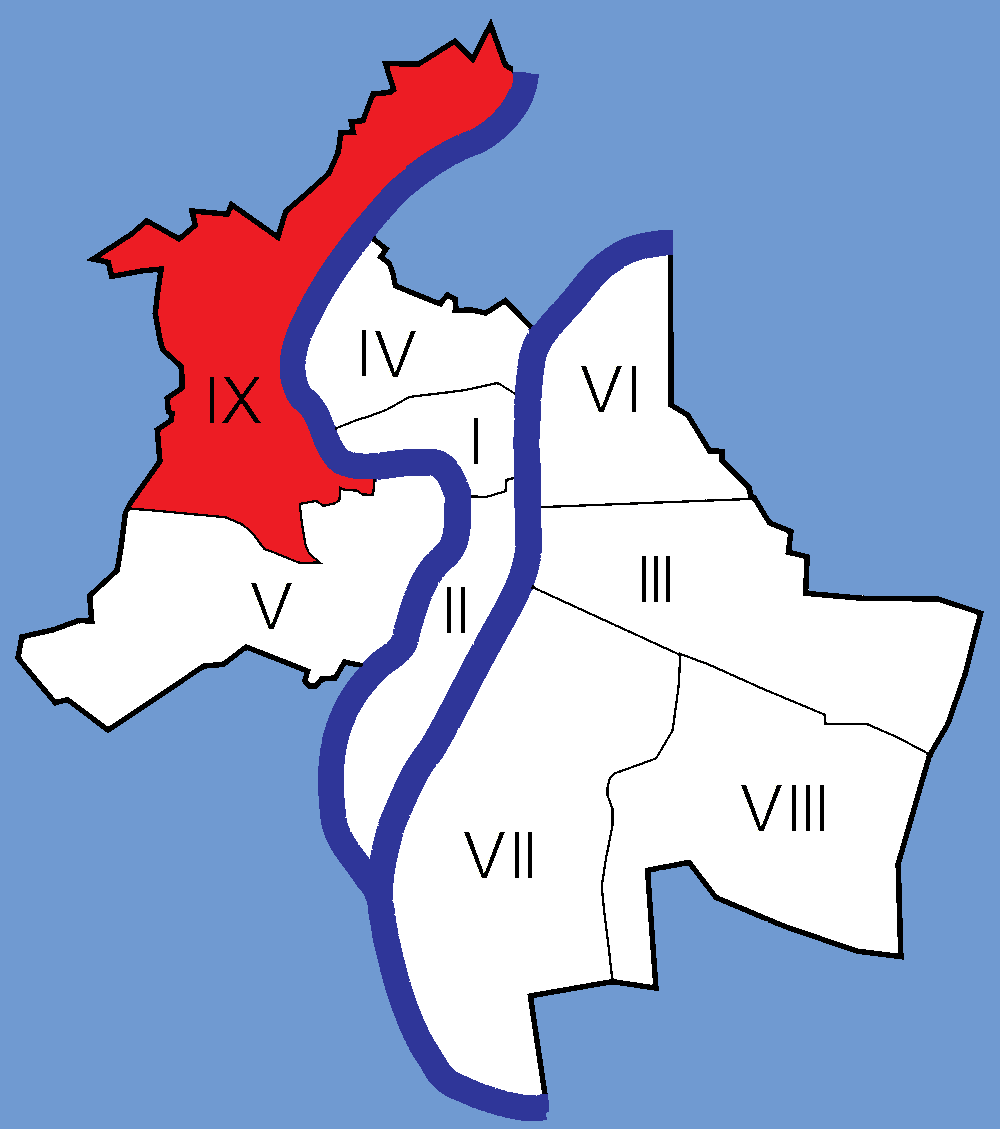
- Location within Lyon
- Coordinates: 45°46′40″N 4°48′15″E
- Country: France
- Region: Auvergne-Rhône-Alpes
- Department: Lyon Metropolis
- Commune: Lyon

Government
  - Mayor (2020–2026): Anne Braibant-Thoraval (EELV)
- Area: 7.25 km^{2} (2.80 sq mi)
- Population (2023): 53,567
  - Density: 7,390/km^{2} (19,100/sq mi)
- INSEE code: 69389

The 9th arrondissement of Lyon (French: 9^{e} arrondissement de Lyon) is one of the nine arrondissements of the City of Lyon. It covers the northwestern quarters Vaise, Gorge de Loup, Saint-Rambert-l'Île-Barbe, La Duchère and part of Champvert.

The nine arrondissements of Lyon

Arrondissements of Lyon

== Transports ==
This arrondissement is served by metro line.

Two railway stations are located in the 9th arrondissement: Lyon-Gorge-de-Loup and Lyon-Vaise.
