= Arrondissements of Lyon =

Administrative divisions of Lyon, France

The nine arrondissements of Lyon

Arrondissements of Lyon

The arrondissements of Lyon (French: Arrondissements de Lyon) are the nine administrative divisions (arrondissements) of the City of Lyon. Together with Paris and Marseille, it is one of three communes in France to have municipal arrondissements.

Each arrondissement is governed by a council (conseil d'arrondissement) and mayor, both elected for six years; the arrondissements return a number of councillors to the municipal council of Lyon, proportionally to their population, for city matters.

Unlike the spiral pattern of the arrondissements of Paris, or the meandering pattern of the arrondissements of Marseille, the layout in Lyon is more idiosyncratic. This is for historical reasons: following the annexation of the communes of La Guillotière, La Croix-Rousse and Vaise in 1852, the newly enlarged city was divided into five arrondissements, which originally spiralled out anticlockwise from the Hôtel de Ville (City Hall); however, as the city's population expanded, it became necessary to split certain arrondissements, giving rise to today's seemingly random pattern.

== History ==
=== Arrondissements of Lyon in 1852 ===
- 1st arrondissement: as today (Terreaux, Martinière/Saint-Vincent, Pentes de la Croix-Rousse)
- 2nd arrondissement: as today (Cordeliers, Bellecour, Ainay, Perrache, Confluent)
- 3rd arrondissement: former commune of La Guillotière (all of the Left Bank of the Rhône)
- 4th arrondissement: as today (former commune of La Croix-Rousse)
- 5th arrondissement: all of the Right Bank of the Saône (including Fourvière and the former commune of Vaise)

As the 19th century progressed, the area known then as Les Brotteaux started to be developed by Jean-Antoine Morand, and consequently, the population of this part of the 3rd arrondissement began to increase rapidly. In 1867, the decision was taken to split the 3rd arrondissement in two, and a 6th arrondissement was created north of Cours Lafayette.

In 1894, the 6th arrondissement was expanded to include all of the Parc de la Tête d'or, which until then had been split between Lyon and Villeurbanne.

As the turn of the century approached, the southern parts of the 3rd arrondissement also began to experience considerable development. By 1912, the population had increased so much that a decision was once again taken to split the 3rd arrondissement; a 7th arrondissement was created south of the Cours des Brosses (today Cours Gambetta/Cours Albert Thomas/Avenue Rockefeller).

The development of Monplaisir and the surrounding area throughout the 20th century led to a further split, in 1959, when an 8th arrondissement was created to the east of the Lyon–Marseille railway line.

Four years later, Lyon's last annexation took place: in 1963, the commune of Saint-Rambert-l'Île-Barbe was incorporated into the 5th arrondissement. However, one year later, the decision was taken to split what had become a sprawling and populous arrondissement into two: in 1964, the 9th arrondissement came into being. The seemingly arbitrary boundary (along Avenue Barthélemy Buyer and across Fourvière to join the banks of the Saône north of Saint-Paul), which does not follow the historical limit between Lyon and Vaise (which lay further north), was probably drawn for convenience's sake prior to the completion of the Champvert neighbourhood, which is now split between the 5th and the 9th arrondissements.

=== Arrondissements of Lyon since 1964 ===
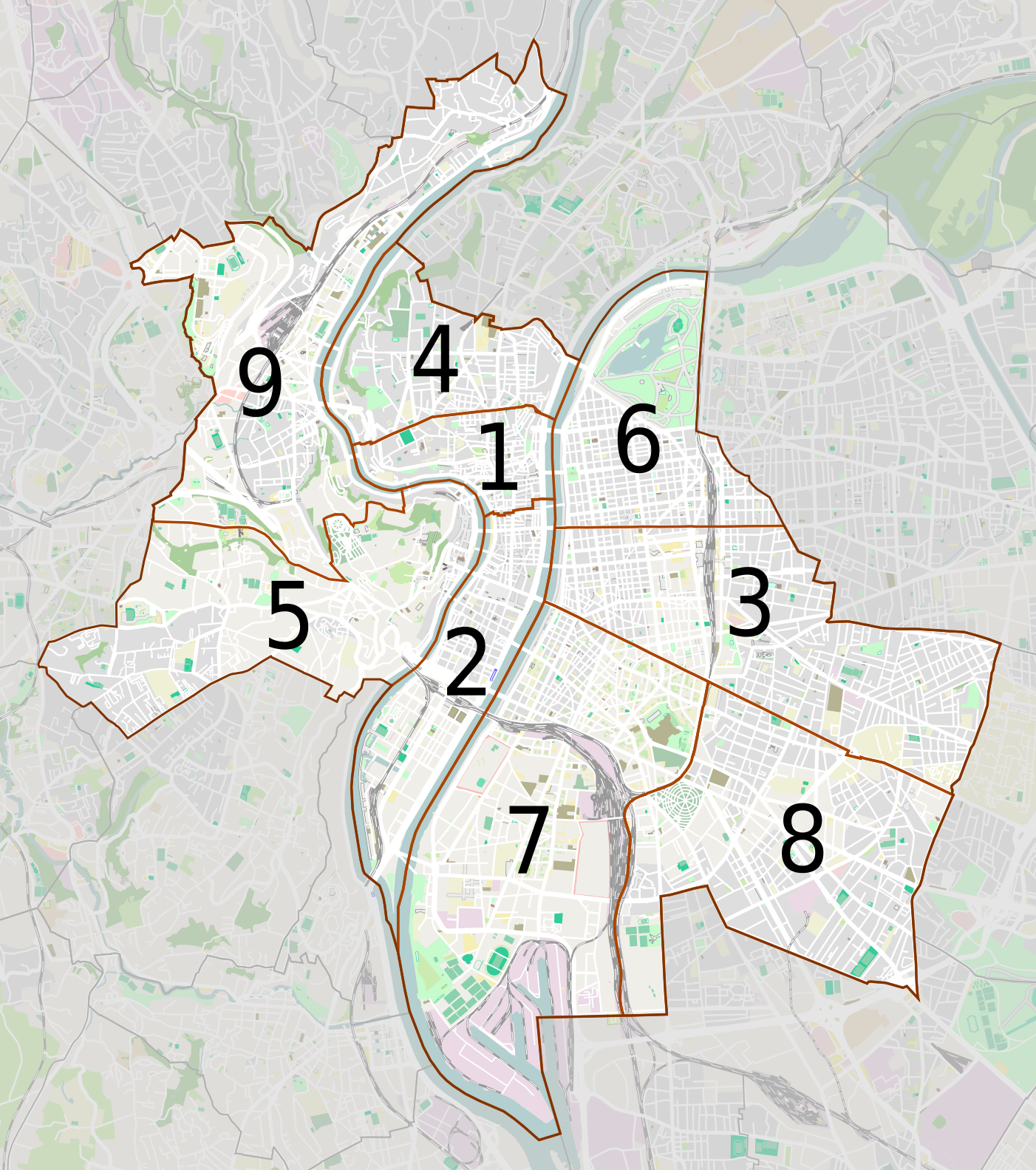
Map of Lyon divided into arrondissements

- 1st arrondissement: Presqu'île north (Terreaux, Martinière/Saint-Vincent), Pentes de la Croix-Rousse – served by metro lines A, C and D
- 2nd arrondissement: Presqu'île south (Cordeliers, Bellecour, Ainay, Perrache, Confluence) – served by metro lines A and D and tram lines T1 and T2
- 3rd arrondissement: Préfecture, Guillotière north, Part-Dieu, Villette, Sans Souci/Dauphiné, Montchat, Grange Blanche north – served by metro lines B and D and tram lines T1 and T3
- 4th arrondissement: Plateau de la Croix-Rousse, Serin – served by metro line C
- 5th arrondissement: Vieux Lyon (Saint-Paul, Saint-Jean, Saint-Georges), Fourvière, Saint-Just, Saint-Irénée, Point du Jour, Ménival, Battières, Champvert south – served by metro line D and funicular lines F1 and F2
- 6th arrondissement: Brotteaux, Bellecombe, Parc de la Tête d'or, Cité internationale – served by metro lines A and B and tram line T1
- 7th arrondissement: Guillotière south, Jean Macé, Gerland – served by metro lines B and D and tram lines T1 and T2
- 8th arrondissement: Monplaisir, Monplaisir-la-Plaine, États-Unis, Bachut, Grand Trou/Moulin à Vent, Mermoz, Laënnec/Transvaal, Grange Blanche south – served by metro line D and tram lines T2 and T4
- 9th arrondissement: Vaise, Gorge de Loup, Observance, Duchère (Balmont, Château, Plateau, Sauvegarde), Rochecardon, Saint-Rambert-l'Île-Barbe, Champvert north – served by metro line D

Geographically, Lyon's two main rivers, the Saône and the Rhône, divide the arrondissements into three groups:

- To the west of the Saône, the 5th arrondissement covers the old city (Vieux Lyon), Fourvière hill and the plateau beyond. The 9th is immediately to the north, and stretches from Gorge de Loup, through Vaise to the neighbouring suburbs of Écully, Champagne-au-Mont-d'Or, Saint-Didier-au-Mont-d'Or, Saint-Cyr-au-Mont-d'Or and Collonges-au-Mont-d'Or.
- Between the two rivers, on the Presqu'île (Peninsula) are the 2nd, 1st and 4th arrondissements. The 2nd includes most of the city centre, including Place Bellecour and Perrache railway station, and reaches as far as the confluence of the two rivers. The 1st is directly to the north of the 2nd and covers part of the city centre (including the Hôtel de Ville) and the slopes (pentes) of La Croix-Rousse, up to the Boulevard de la Croix-Rousse. To the north of the boulevard is the 4th arrondissement, which covers the Plateau de la Croix-Rousse, up to its boundary with Cuire in the commune of Caluire-et-Cuire.
- To the east of the Rhône, are the 3rd, 6th, 7th and 8th arrondissements.

=== The future – possible further arrondissements for Lyon ===
There have been talks of Lyon absorbing neighbouring suburbs, such as Villeurbanne or Caluire-et-Cuire. Others have advocated the Metropolis of Lyon evolve to former one large, single commune.

Although the neighbouring suburb of Villeurbanne is sometimes referred to as Lyon's "10th arrondissement", the likelihood of it ever being incorporated into the city is remote. Starting in the 19th century, Lyon tried several times to annex its smaller neighbour. Villeurbanne resisted annexation in 1852, only ceding its section of the Parc de la Tête d'or in 1894 in exchange for a considerable payment from its larger neighbour, and now has a sufficiently strong identity and sufficiently high population – 134,000 (2005 estimate), making it France's most populous suburban commune – for the prospect of annexation to be far off. In fact, the Urban Community of Lyon (the Metropolis of Lyon's predecessor structure) already offered the majority of the advantages that Villeurbanne might receive from being part of the City of Lyon.

== List of arrondissements ==
INSEE code	Postal code	Arrondissement	Date of creation	Cantons (Note: Up to the establishment of the Metropolis of Lyon on 1 January 2015, when all cantons on its territory were abolished.)	Population (2006 estimates)	Population (1999 census)	Area (km^{2})	Density (1999 census) (/km^{2})
69381	69001	1st arrondissement	24 March 1852	Lyon-II	28,210	26,868	1.51	17,793
69382	69002	2nd arrondissement	24 March 1852	Lyon-I	30,276	27,977	3.41	8,204
69383	69003	3rd arrondissement	24 March 1852 (Note: Former commune of La Guillotière.)	Lyon-VIII, Lyon-XI and Lyon-XIII	88,755	82,568	6.34	13,003
69384	69004	4th arrondissement	24 March 1852 (Note: Former commune of La Croix-Rousse.)	Lyon-III	34,302	33,797	2.93	11,535
69385	69005	5th arrondissement	24 March 1852 (Note: Originally including the former commune of Vaise, in the 9th since 1964.)	Lyon-V	47,330	46,985	6.23	7,542
69386	69006	6th arrondissement	17 July 1867 (Note: Detachment of a part of the 3rd.)	Lyon-VI and Lyon-VII	49,965	48,167	3.77	12,776
69387	69007	7th arrondissement	8 March 1912 (Note: Detachment of a part of the 3rd.)	Lyon-IX and Lyon-X	69,331	61,743	9.75	6,333
69388	69008	8th arrondissement	9 February 1959 (Note: Detachment of a part of the 7th.)	Lyon-XII and Lyon-XIV	76,323	70,317	6.67	10,542
69389	69009	9th arrondissement	12 August 1964 (Note: Detachment of a part of the 5th plus the former commune of Saint-Rambert-l'Île-Barbe.)	Lyon-IV	47,813	47,030	7.25	6,487

== See also ==
- List of streets and squares in Lyon
