= Avenue de Saxe =

Thoroughfare in Lyon, France

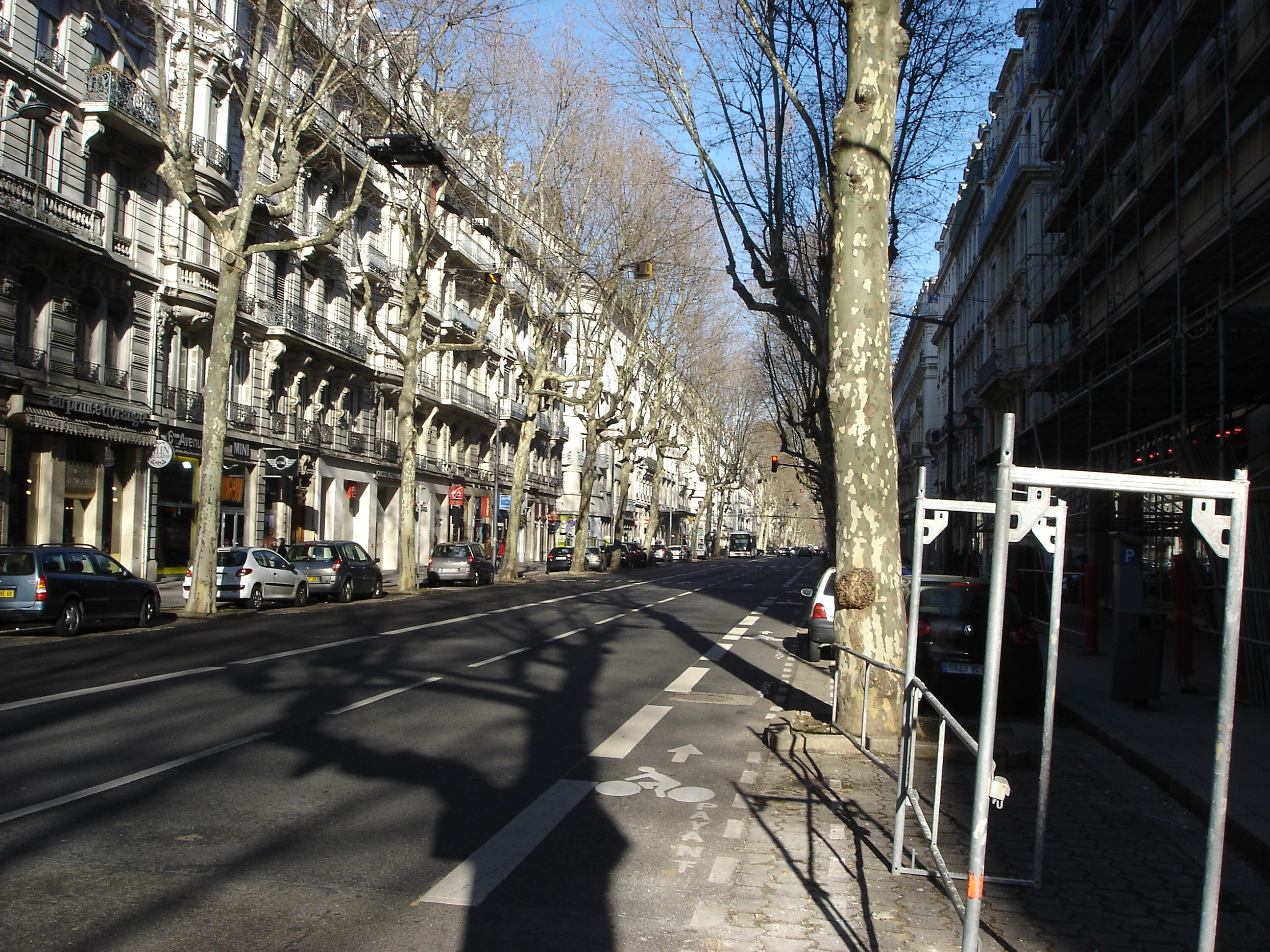
- The street in the 6th arrondissement
- Interactive map of Avenue de Saxe
- Type: Street
- Location: 3rd and 6th arrondissements of Lyon, Lyon, France
- Postal code: 69003, 69006
- Coordinates: 45.758987°N 4.845928°E

The Avenue du Maréchal de Saxe (or Avenue de Saxe) is a broad avenue located in the 3rd and the 6th arrondissements of Lyon. It was named after Maurice de Saxe, Marshal of France.

== Architecture and description ==
This avenue starts perpendicularly with the Cours Gambetta and ends with the Cours Franklin Roosevelt. Very large and busy, it is one of the main route of the 3rd arrondissement of Lyon, mostly surrounded by beautiful buildings dating from Haussmann's 19th century, bordered with two rows of plane trees. There are often sculptures and decorations on the doors of buildings. Part of the street formed the Avenue Jean-Jaurès.

From No. 52 to No. 56, there is a group of 1880s facades with carved heads. At Nos. 55-57, the Palace of the Automobile has an Art Deco architecture. A white stone castle, surrounded by a small wooden house, can be seen after the Rue Servient. Then there are some small old buildings among many 20th-century reconstructions. There is a tower at the corner of the Rue Rabelais, and another one of six floors at the corner with the Rue Villeroy. The Consulate of Burkina Faso is also present in the avenue. The Théatre Tête d'Or, built in 1925, replaced La Cigale Hall on 10 September 2001 at number 60.

The southern part of the street displays an almost continuous frontage of shopping venues.

This is a great shopping street with mostly clothing and food stores, bookstores, restaurants, doctors' offices ... The street is famous for its four-day flea market per year, named Saxe. It is also among the most expensive and the noisiest streets of Lyon.

== History ==
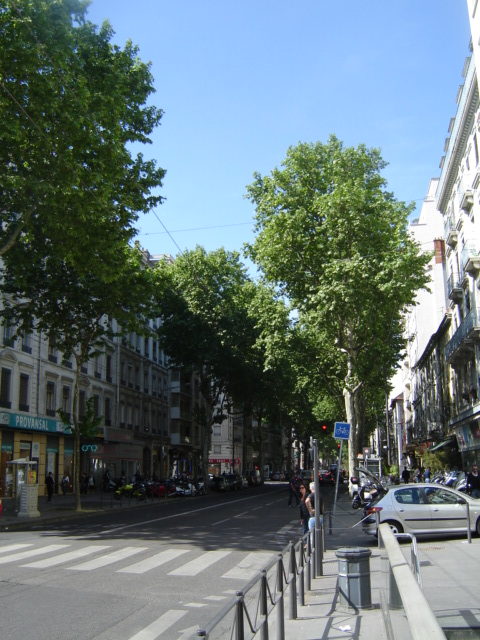
The street lined with plane trees, viewed from the Cours Gambetta, in the 3rd arrondissement

Alongside the Avenue du Maréchal Foch, the street was in the Brotteaux quarter one of the major components of the map established by French architect Jean-Antoine Morand, who had planned it as a wide avenue with trees. The current name of the street was given in 1825.

The northern part was opened in the early 19th century, then extended at the south during the Second Empire. In 1856, there were very significant flooding which caused damage to houses which were replaced by buildings. Architect Joseph-Dominique Moreau rebuild many of them in the street. At number 139, a plaque indicates that French aerospace engineer Charles Voisin was born there, on 12 July 1882. In 1902, the Masonic Order of Mopses was active in the avenue. In the 19th century, Baron, writer and scholar Achille Raverat and architect Darfeuille were among famous inhabitants of this street. All numbers of buildings were changed in 1930 to start at number 1. From 1968, French television host Simone Garnier has lived in the avenue.

One of the most sophisticated bathhouses was planned in this avenue in 1892 by F. Defoug, with a standard laundry and even a nursery. In the nineteenth century, there was at No. 72 a beautiful stained glass made by E. Flachat in 1904. In 1910, at the corner with the Cours Lafayette, a first light column was placed, being initiated by the Société des colonnes à réclames mobiles et lumineuses, Ferrer & Cie, in Paris.
