= Fort Montluc =

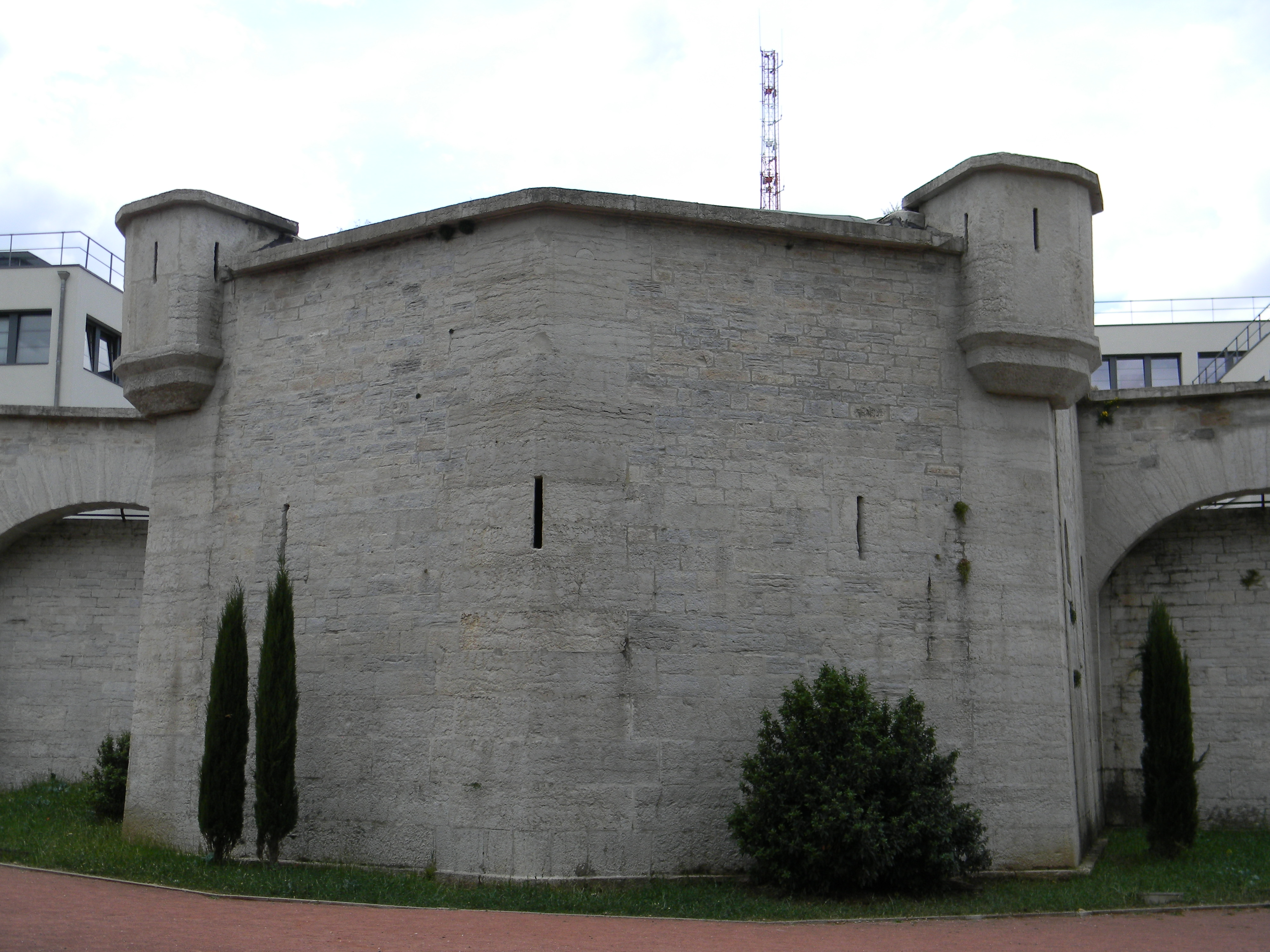
- Fort bastion
- Interactive map of Fort Montluc
- Location: Lyon, France
- Coordinates: 45.751789°N 4.862823°E
- Beginning date: 1831
- Completion date: 1835

Fort Montluc, also known as Fort de Villeurbanne, is a fort located in the 3rd arrondissement of Lyon. The fort was built in 1831 as part of the Ceintures de Lyon, which were a series of fortifications surrounding Lyon. It is currently used as a metropolitan police station.

== History ==
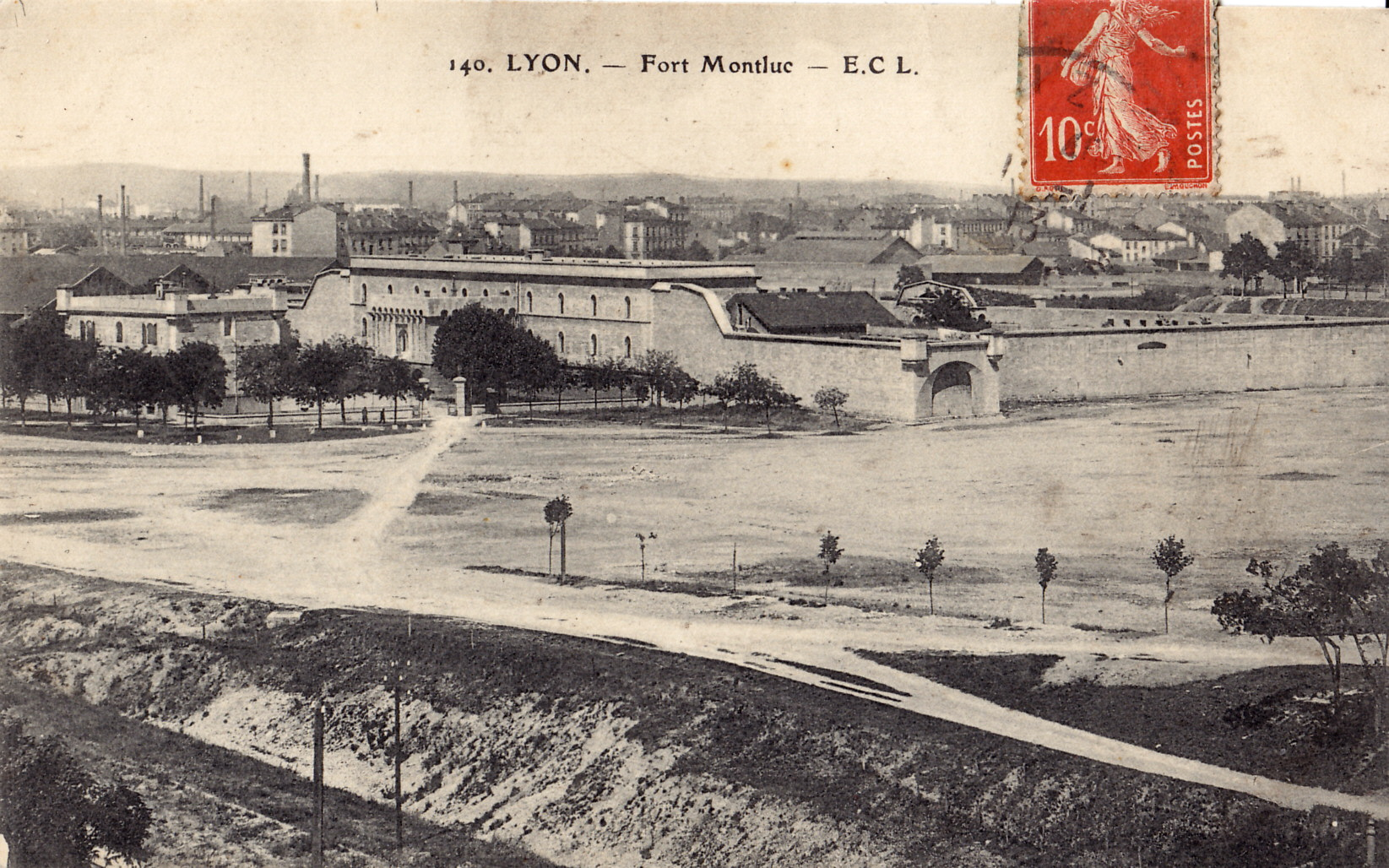
The fort at the beginning of the 20th century

Fort Montluc was built between 1831 and 1835 and was part of a system of fortifications to protect Lyon from possible enemy attack. The trapezoidal shape and two outward-facing bastions were designed to protect the suburb of Guillotière. It was surrounded by water similar to the Fort des Brotteaux and was accessible by a wooden bridge. The interior included a large two-storey cavalier which, could hold 600 soldiers. The fort later served as a garrison.

== Present day ==
At the end of the 19th century, the glacis surrounding the fort were occupied by French military, and have since been replaced by a garden square. The fort was owned by the Minister of the Interior from 1969 to 2007, after which it has been used as a metropolitan police station.

== See also ==
- Montluc prison
