= Jean-Marie Charpentier =

French architect and urban planner

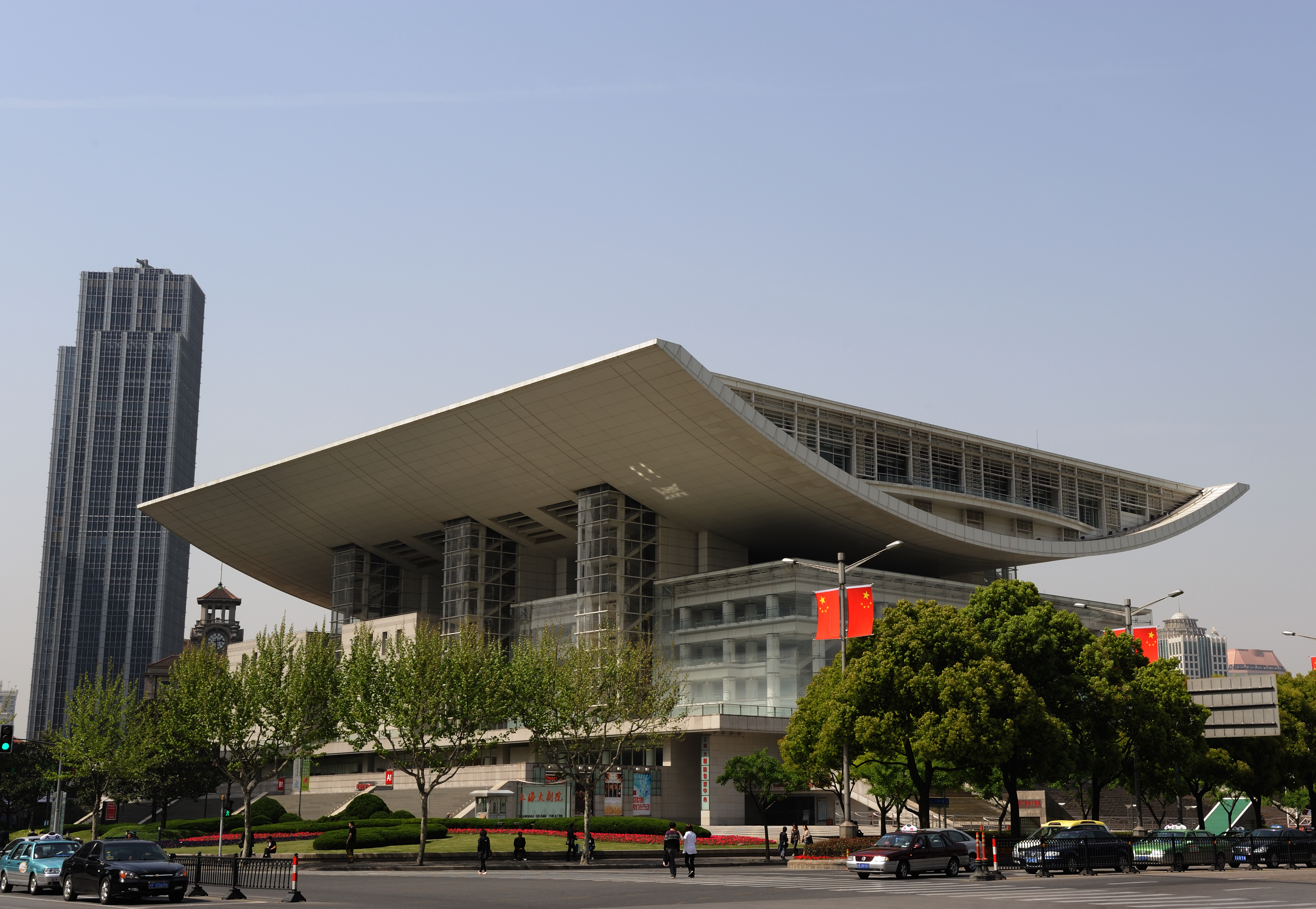
The Shanghai Grand Theatre

Jean-Marie Charpentier (27 April 1939 – 24 December 2010) was a French architect and urban planner. He founded Arte Charpentier in Paris in 1969.

== Biography ==
Jean-Marie Charpentier was born in Paris, France.

Jean-Marie Charpentier graduated in urbanism at the University of Paris in 1966, and at the École nationale supérieure des beaux-arts in 1969. He taught architecture in Cambodia for a year, before founding Arte Charpentier in Paris in 1969. Arte stands for Architecture, Research, Technique and Environment. The agency comprises four practices: urban planning & design, landscape design, architecture, interior design.

In 1984, Jean-Marie Charpentier is one of the first European architects to settle in China.

Jean-Marie Charpentier is the grand-nephew of composer Gustave Charpentier.

== Projects ==
- Shanghai Grand Theatre
