= Lyon Dubai City =

Lyon Dubaï City is a project being developed by the city of Dubai in the United Arab Emirates.

== The project ==
- The project “Lyon-Dubai City” began with a meeting between Buti Saeed Al Ghandi, chairman of Emivest, and decision makers of the city of Lyon.
- During a trip to Lyon on a promoter from the United States, Buti Saeed al-Gandhi, became fond of the city. He thought of the idea of the construction of a neighborhood that would recreate the atmosphere of Lyon and some of its notable buildings in Dubai.
- Aiming to increase the international influence of Lyon, the Mayor Gérard Collomb signed an agreement with al-Gandhi on 9 January 2008.
