= Bourse du Travail (Lyon) =

Coordinates: 45.7593°N 4.8482°E

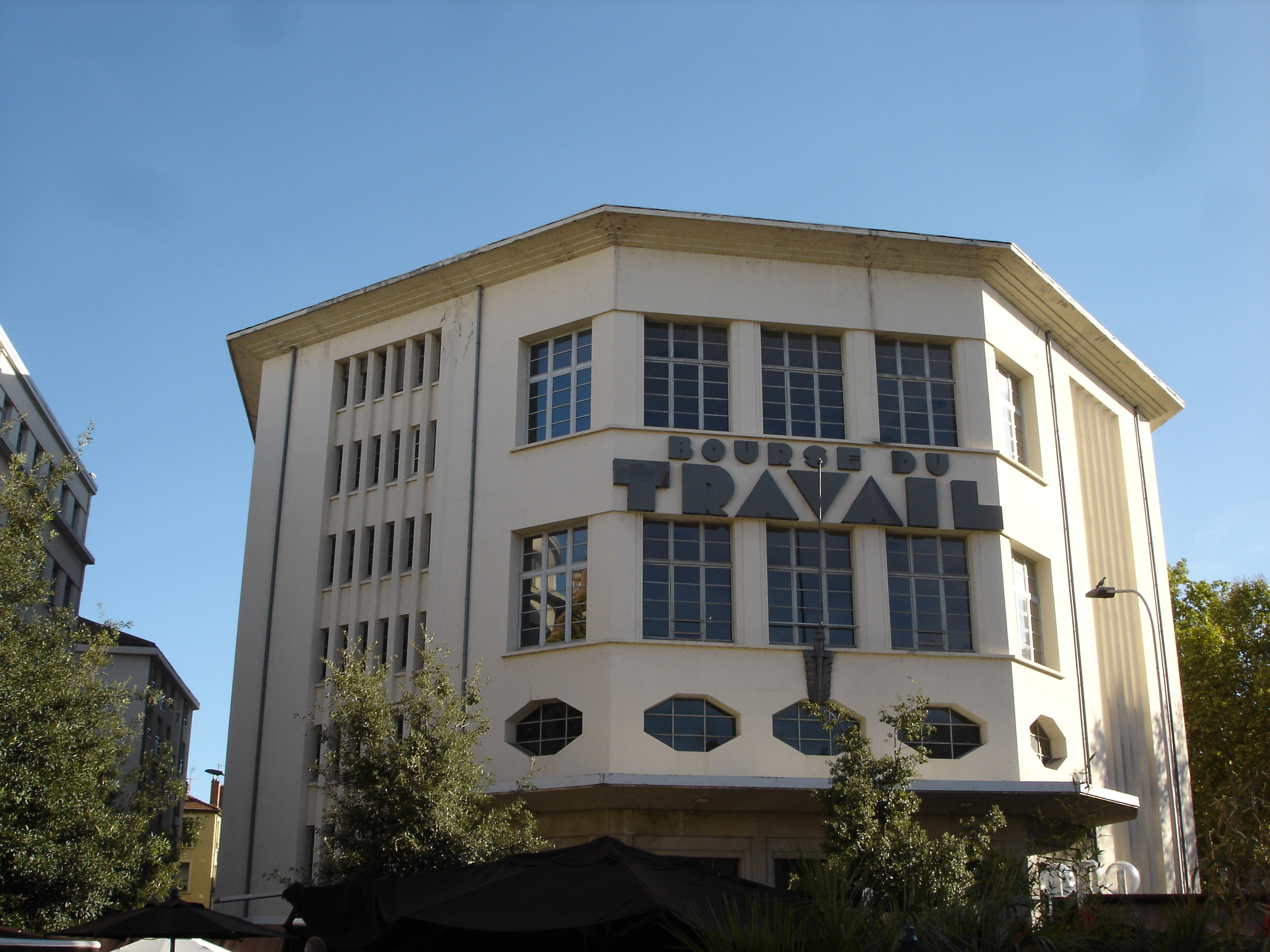
Bourse du Travail

The Bourse du Travail is a 1,950-capacity theatre located in Lyon, France.

== History ==
Built in 1929, it was designated a monument historique in 1989.

== Concert hall ==
Some of the artists that performed at the venue include Asia, Mötley Crüe, Blue Öyster Cult, Iggy Pop and Metallica.

== Bibliography ==
- Commander, Emily (24 May 2017). "The Secret History of Buildings: The Bourse du Travail, Lyon". The Connexion.
