= Vaise =

Neighborhood of Lyon, France

Coordinates: 45°46′31″N 4°48′19″E

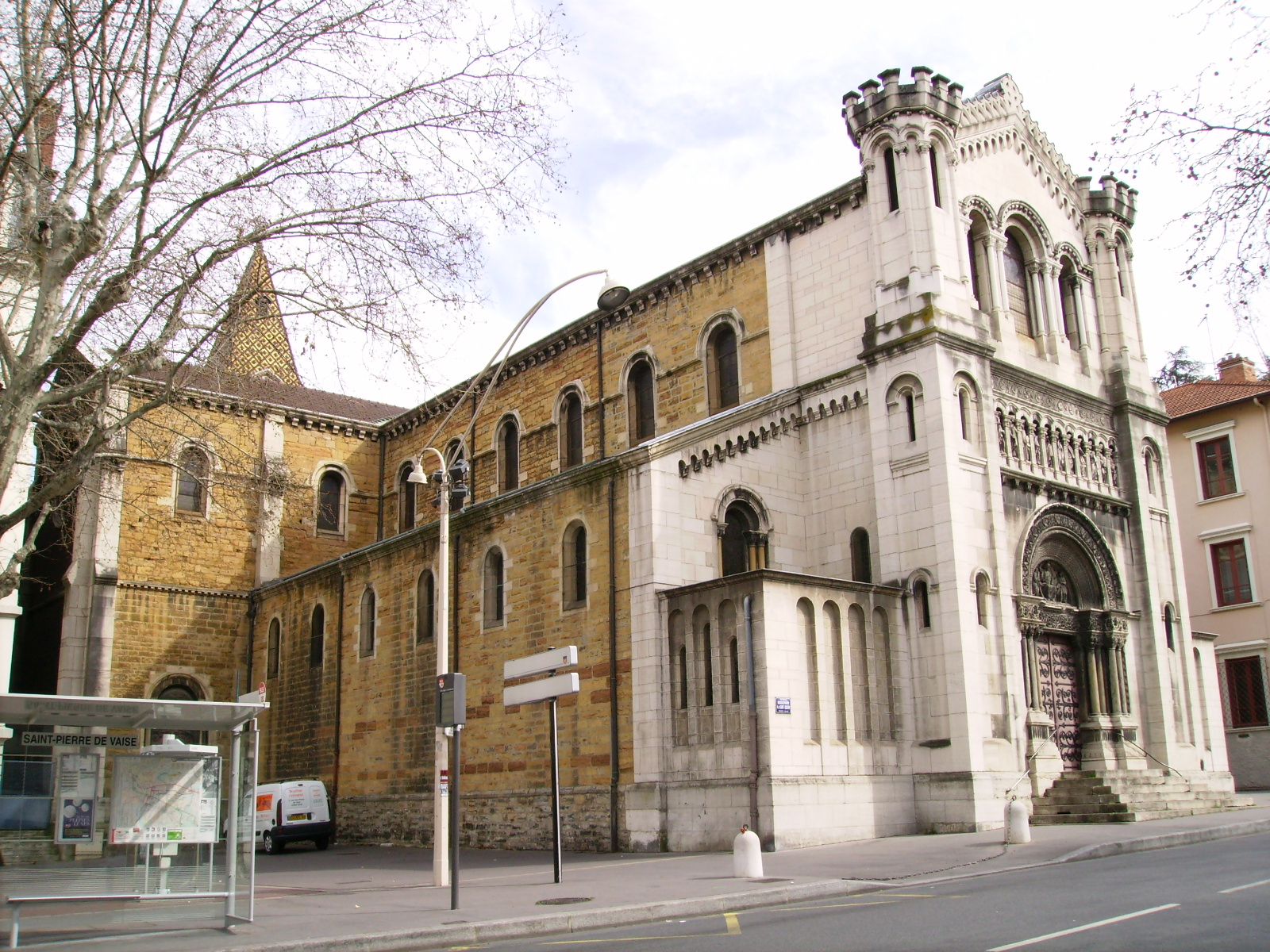
Église Saint-Pierre de Vaise

Vaise (French pronunciation: [vɛz]) is a neighborhood of the City of Lyon (France), located along the Saône at the foot of the plateau Duchère, north-west of the city. Former commune of the Rhône department, Vaise was linked to Lyon on 24 March 1852, to form part of the 5th arrondissement. Vaise was then attached to the 9th arrondissement at its creation on 12 August 1964.
