= Tour Oxygène =

Coordinates: 45°45′44″N 4°51′25″E

- The Tour Oxygène in 2024.
- Interactive map of the Tour Oxygène area

General information
- Status: Completed
- Type: Office
- Location: La Part-Dieu, Lyon, France
- Construction started: 2007
- Completed: 2010

Height
- Roof: 115 m (377 ft)

Technical details
- Floor count: 28
- Floor area: 28.714 m^{2} (309.07 sq ft)
- Lifts/elevators: 7

Design and construction
- Architect: Arte Charpentier et associés
- Developer: Sogelym Steiner

The Tour Oxygène (Oxygen Tower in English) is a skyscraper which rises 28 levels in the district of La Part-Dieu in the 3rd arrondissement of Lyon, France. It forms part of the Oxygen Project, which includes the office tower and a shopping center, the Cours Oxygène. The tower rises 115 meters high.

== Project ==
Rising to 115 m high and with 80% glass area, the tower is smaller than its close neighbor, the Part-Dieu tower (165 meters at the top of the pyramid), but dominates the Swiss Tower (82 meters) which it directly faces. It has 28,794 m^{2} of offices where two-thirds, 16,000 m^{2} from the first to the 17th floor, are already reserved by the SNCF, which wants to install the seat of its national leadership computing.

The extension of the shopping center La Part-Dieu (the "Oxygen Course") adds a sales area of 11,040 m^{2} to the current center (including 2,000 m^{2} reserved by Monoprix).

The promoter is the group Sogelym Steiner and businesses are GFC Construction and Bouygues Construction Privée. Anticipating the construction of one floor every four days, the group used two types of cranes: two Potain tower cranes (MD 365 B L16 of 16 tons and MDT 222 J12 of 12 tons), and the proximity of the shopping center site with the tower required the use of two other cranes (MR 225A of 14 tons).

The tower contains eighty workstations per tray of 1,000 m^{2} each located on twenty-eight floors served by seven lifts. On May 4, 2010, the new mall reached 15 000m ² with 25 new shops.

== History ==
- In June 2006, the Departmental Committee of Commercial Equipment agreed the proposed shopping mall at the bottom of the tower Oxygen.
- On 29 March 2007, the first building was laid in the presence of Gérard Collomb, then mayor of Lyon.
- On 11 July 2008, the clearance work was completed and foundation work began.
- In January 2009, the tower rose 40 meters high.
- On 29 March 2009, the tower rose 85 meters high and became the second tallest building in the neighborhood beating the Tour Swiss Life.
- In late April the tower was over 100 meters high.
- The Oxygen tower finally reached its maximum height of 115 meters in May 2009.

== See also ==
- Tour Incity
- Tour du Crédit Lyonnais
- Sustainable architecture
