= Tour Incity =

Skyscraper office in Lyon, France

Coordinates: 45°45′48″N 4°51′03″E

- Interactive map of the Tour Incity area

General information
- Status: Completed
- Type: Office
- Location: La Part-Dieu, Lyon, France
- Construction started: 2013
- Completed: 2015
- Opening: 2015

Height
- Antenna spire: 200 m (660 ft)
- Roof: 170 m (560 ft)
- Top floor: 154 m (505 ft)

Technical details
- Floor count: 39
- Floor area: 40,000 m^{2} (430,000 sq ft)
- Lifts/elevators: 12

Design and construction
- Architects: Valode & Pistre; AIA Atelier de la Rize
- Developer: Sogelym Steiner

Other information
- Public transit access: Lyon Metro Line B: T1, T3, T4 (Rhônexpress)

Website
- Official website

The Tour Incity is an office skyscraper in the La Part-Dieu district of Lyon, France. Built between 2013 and 2015, the tower stands at 200 m (660 ft) tall with 39 floors, and is the tallest building in the Greater Lyon area as well as the fifth tallest building in France.

== History ==
Located at the intersection of the Rue Garibaldi and Cours Lafayette, the Incity tower rises to 200 meters tall and replaced the old UAP Tower which was demolished in 2012. Designed by architects from the French firm Valode & Pistre, the tower took the position of the tallest skyscraper in Lyon in 2022, ahead of the Tour Part-Dieu (nicknamed "the Pencil") and the Tour Oxygène, and the fourth tallest skyscraper in France behind the Tour First and the Tour Hekla of La Défense and the Tour Montparnasse of Greater Paris.

The Incity Tower is also the first-ever Haute Qualité Environnementale (HQE) high environmental quality city center tower in France, with 39 floors and a mass of 90,000 tonnes.

=== Project ===
Tour Incity skyline

In its edition of January 25, 2008, France 3 Auvergne-Rhône-Alpes echoed the press conference of the mayor of Lyon Gérard Collomb, representatives of the architectural firm Valode et Pistre, as well as those of the company Groupe Sogelym Dixence announcing the project of a fifth tower in the Part-Dieu business center by 2014.

The Incity tower is planned to be built in place of the former UAP tower, which has been vacant since 1994, in order to make the Part-Dieu district "a business center on a European scale," announced Mayor Gérard Collomb at a press conference. He explained that "today our level of commercialization places us ahead of cities like Milan or Dublin and we can further strengthen our power in the tertiary sector [...] There is still room for two or three towers in the coming years," recalling that the Part-Dieu district is the second largest business district in France after La Défense.

The Incity tower, which will culminate at 200 meters thanks to its spire (or mast) and whose roof will rise to 170 meters high, aims to become the first BBC tower in the city center. With 39 floors, Incity will offer a surface area of 42,000 m^{2} (450,000 sq ft) of offices The architects Denis Valode and Albert Constantin are in charge of this project, led by Sogelym Dixence. Incity will be the largest in size and chronologically the sixth tower in Lyon, after the Part-Dieu tower (165 m), the Oxygène tower (115 m), the panoramic tower of La Duchère (91 m, 1972, residential building), the Swiss Life tower (82 m) and the EDF Lyon tower (80 m).

The public inquiry into the Incity tower project took place in March 2010 and received muptiple negative opinions due to Lyon's citizens not being sufficiently informed about it in the meantime.

=== Construction ===
On March 31, 2012, M Lyon magazine reported that the architects had modified their plans so that the top of the tower would appear symmetrical from any vantage point in Lyon. The facade was also reportedly modified to make it more elegant. Work on the Incity Tower begins on April 11, 2013. Garibaldi Street also underwent major works to remove the hopper that ran in front of the tower. A 50 mwas airlifted to the tower on June 21, 2015. The construction site was completed at the end of 2015.

=== Manufacturing defects ===
The tower's glass panes are the victims of a manufacturing defect. Impurities weaken the glass structure during large temperature changes. Since the tower's inauguration, 5-square-meter glass panes have been regularly crumbling and falling.

=== Air quality ===
On June 26, 2024, the tower will be equipped with an information system on the air quality of the next day in the Lyon metropolitan area. The project, initiated by the SERA association (Santé Environnement Auvergne Rhône Alpes), aims to inform residents and raise awareness about air quality in the city and global warming. The display is done using the lighting equipment at the top of the tower, the graduation going from blue to mauve.

== Marketing of the surface ==
18 levels are rented to the SNCF Regional Express Transport department. The rest of the offices constitute the head office of the Caisse d'Épargne Rhône-Alpes where 700 employees have been based since the tower was completed. Part of the office rental is handled by the commercial real estate consultancy JLL.

== Transports ==
The tower is connected to the rest of the city by the metro line, tramways T1, T3, T4 and the tram-train airport commuter Rhônexpress.

== See also ==
- La Part-Dieu
- Sustainable architecture
- List of tallest buildings in France

Records
Preceded by Tour Part-Dieu	Tallest building in Lyon; 2015–present 200 metres (660 ft)	Incumbent
