= Two-wheeler insurance =

Type of mandatory insurance in India

Two-wheeler insurance is a type of insurance that is mandatory in India. Falling under the General insurance product category, it helps protect people against accidents that take place on the road. Active two wheeler insurance shields the vehicle owner from any unforeseen occurrences like the accident or any serious damage to the motor vehicle. A two-wheeler insurance policy is provided by any of the authorized insurance companies registered under the Insurance Regulatory Development Authority of India (IRDAI).

== Policy and benefits ==
The law binds anyone riding a two-wheeler with an insurance policy covering the owner of the vehicle against any unanticipated situations or accidents or the vehicle against damage. The vehicle is protected against any damage caused due to natural disasters such as storms, floods, landslides, earthquakes, and so on. In addition, it also covers against the damage caused by the theft, fire, accidents, riot, and explosion.

== Types ==
The motor insurance policy is generally categorized into ‘act only’ and ‘comprehensive’ policies. The former covers the death, physical injuries, or any damage to the property of the third party, the latter includes the coverage for the damage caused due to the external forces in addition to the third party damages. However, the damage by external forces includes damages caused by fire, burglary, lightning, earthquake, cyclone, flood, terrorist acts, landslide, and so on.

== Buying ==
Generally, an insurance policy comes along with the new motor vehicle, wherein the cost of the policy is added up in the price of the vehicle. However, the validity of any two-wheeler insurance is one year and it has to be renewed every year either with the same company or the different company.

Many insurance companies make their presence online. The inspection of the vehicle is not undertaken and left to the risk of the insurance company.

== Notable two-wheeler insurers ==
- Bajaj Allianz General Insurance
- Cholamandalam MS General Insurance
- HDFC ERGO General Insurance Company
- Liberty General Insurance
- New India Assurance
