= Berges du Rhône =

- Quais du Rhône
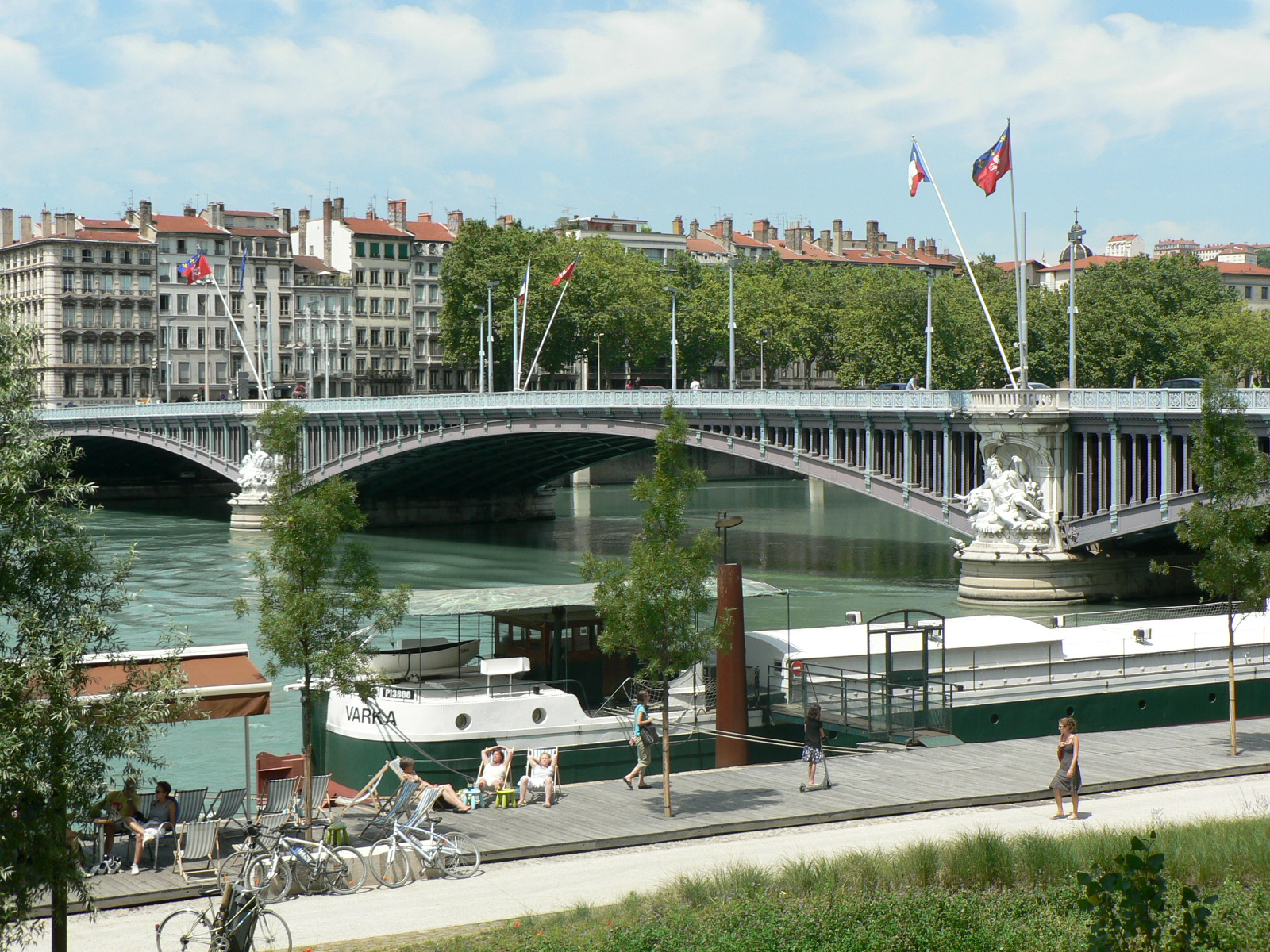
- Lafayette bridge and Augagneur quay
- Interactive map of Berges du Rhône
- Length: 5 km (3.1 mi)
- Area: 10 ha
- Coordinates: 45.754°N 4.838°E

Other
- Status: World Heritage Site (1979)
- Website: Grand Lyon – Berges du Rhône

The Berges du Rhône (Banks of the Rhône) or Quais du Rhône (Quays of the Rhône) refer to a series of parks, quays, streets and walking paths along the Rhône river in Lyon, France. The construction for the modern Berges du Rhône took place between 2005 and 2007, resulting in the development of 10 hectares of land on the left and right banks of the Rhône from Parc de la Tête d'Or to Parc de Gerland.

== History of development ==
Several dams were built during the nineteenth century to prevent flooding on the left bank of the Rhône, in particular the flood of 1856. The Grand Camp dam (digue du Grand Camp) was built in 1859.

=== Modern development ===
In 1984, the Lyon Fair was moved from its original location upstream of the quays of the Rhône near Parc de la Tete d'Or to Chassieu to become the Eurexpo. The vacant land was used to build Cité Internationale, which includes the Musée d'art contemporain de Lyon, cinemas, an auditorium, the Palais des congrès de Lyon and the global headquarters of Interpol.

=== The modern Berges du Rhône ===
The modern Berges du Rhône were developed with the aim of creating a space for relaxation and leisure activities including paths for walking and cycling along the Rhône. Space was created by eliminating parking spaces. The developed area covers an area of 10 hectares (25 acres), over a distance of 5 kilometres (3.1 miles), from Parc de la Tête d'Or to Parc de Gerland.

In 2001 the Lyon city planning agency developed a scope statement outlining the goals for the project, which included removing parking spaces and introducing flood reduction measures. The project cost was estimated to be €15.5 million at the time. In 2002 the city released the design for the project.

A development team was chosen in 2003, and a consultation phase began the same year. During the consultation phase, the municipal opposition criticized the removal of parking spaces on the banks of the Rhône and their replacement with paid parking garages. In the second quarter of 2004, the project was presented in its final version. A budget of €44 million was finalized for the project.

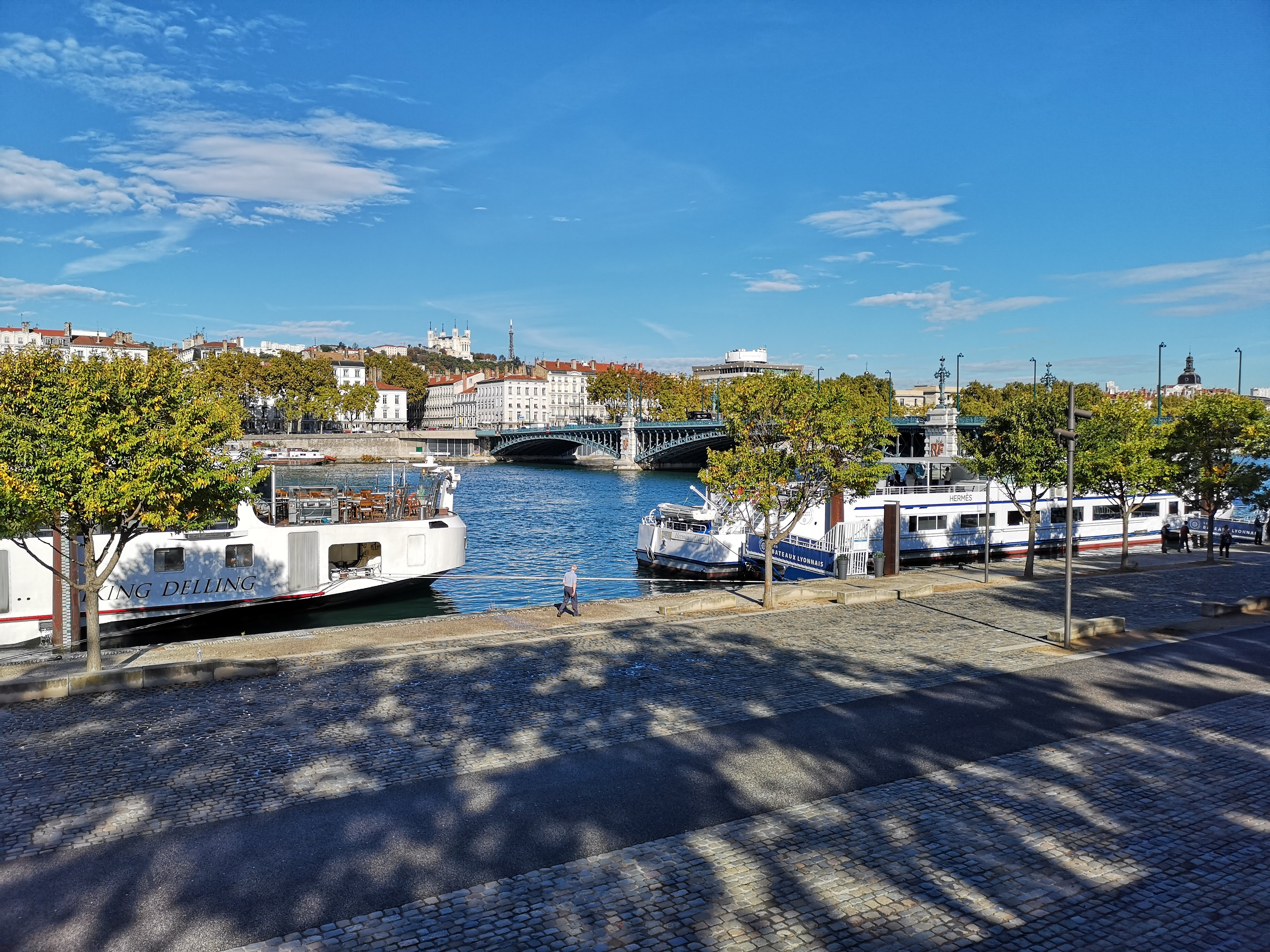
The Berges du Rhone with the bridge of the university and the Notre-Dame de Fourvière basilica in the background

In 2005 work began by eliminating parking along the Rhône and constructing several dolphin structures for mooring barges. Work was completed during the 3rd and 4th quarter of 2007.

=== Later development ===
On the right bank Parc Saint-Clair was created, which stretches along the river from the entrance to Saint-Clair to Poincaré bridge.

Construction of the 220-metre (720-foot) long Passerelle de la Paix began in March 2012 and completed in 2013, linking Caluire and Cité internationale.

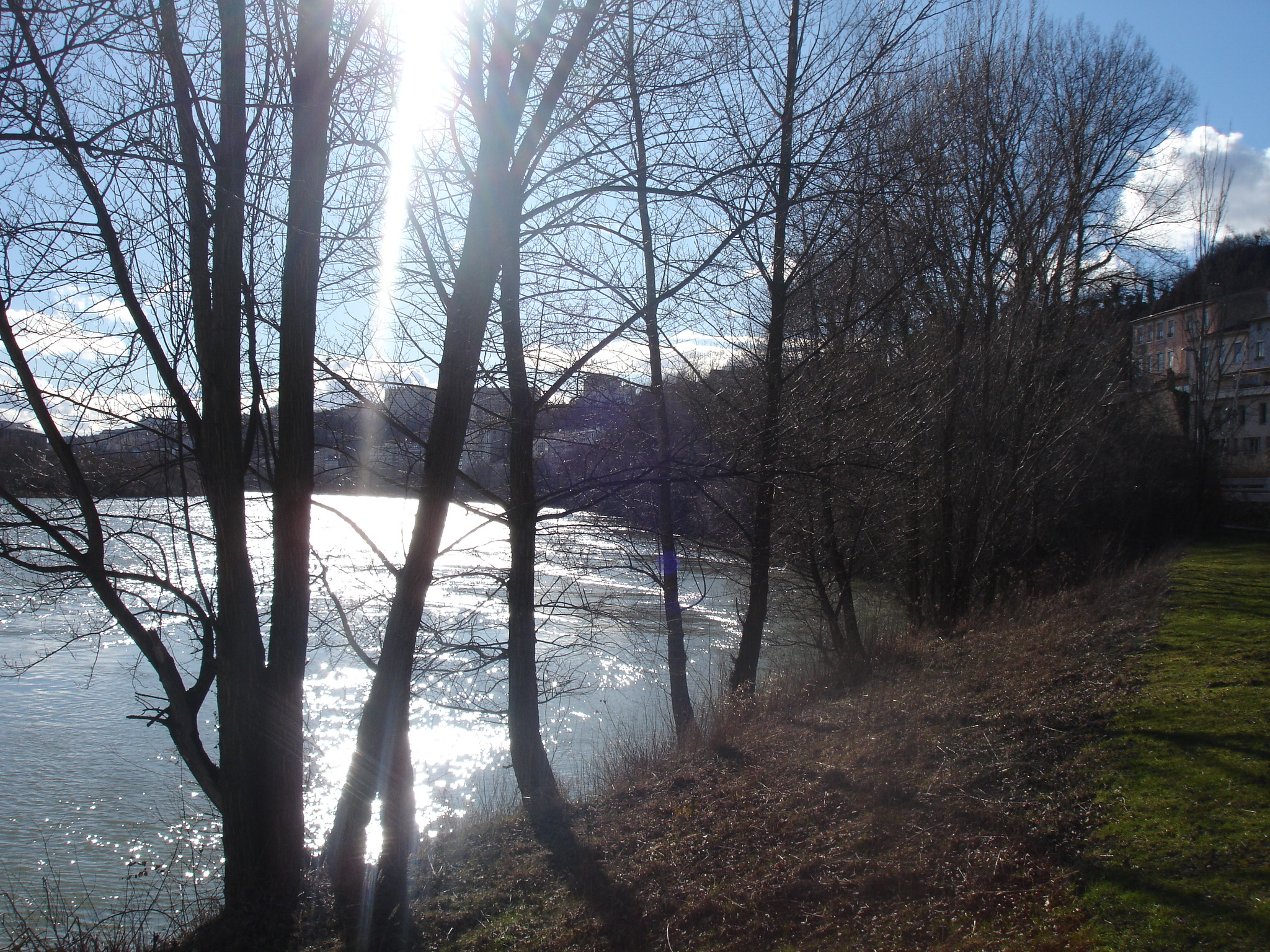
Berges du Rhône at Parc Saint-Clair

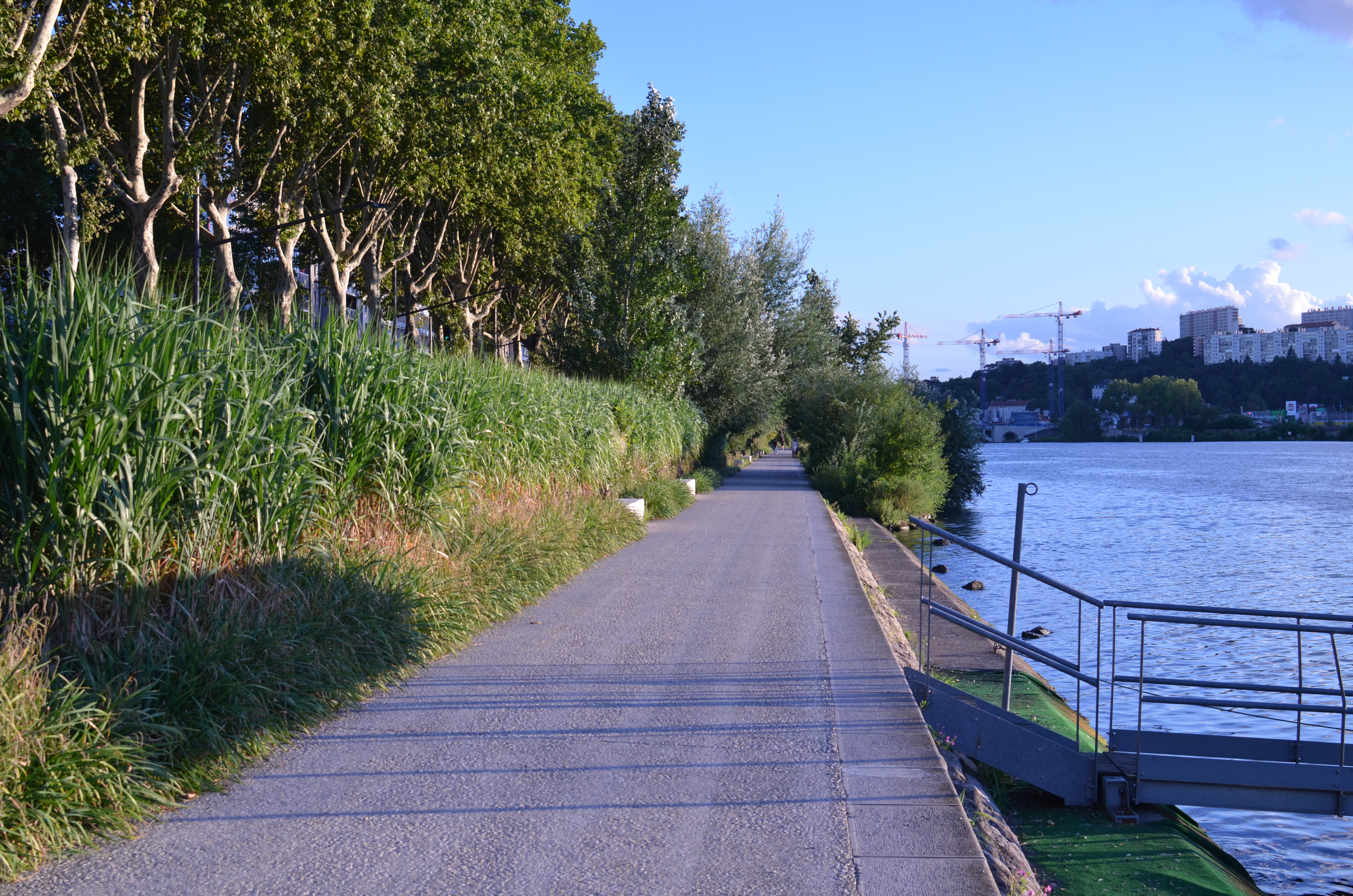
Berges du Rhône at avenue Général-Leclerc

== Right bank ==
The following quays were developed at the right bank of the Rhône:

- Quai Perrache – Perrache
- Quai du Docteur Gailleton – Bellecour
- Quai Jules Courmont – Bellecour
- Quai Jean Moulin – Cordeliers
- Quai André Lassagne – Terreaux
- Cours D'Herbouville – Croix-Rousse
- Cours Aristide Briand – Caluire
- Quai Charles Sénard – Saint-Clair

== Left bank ==
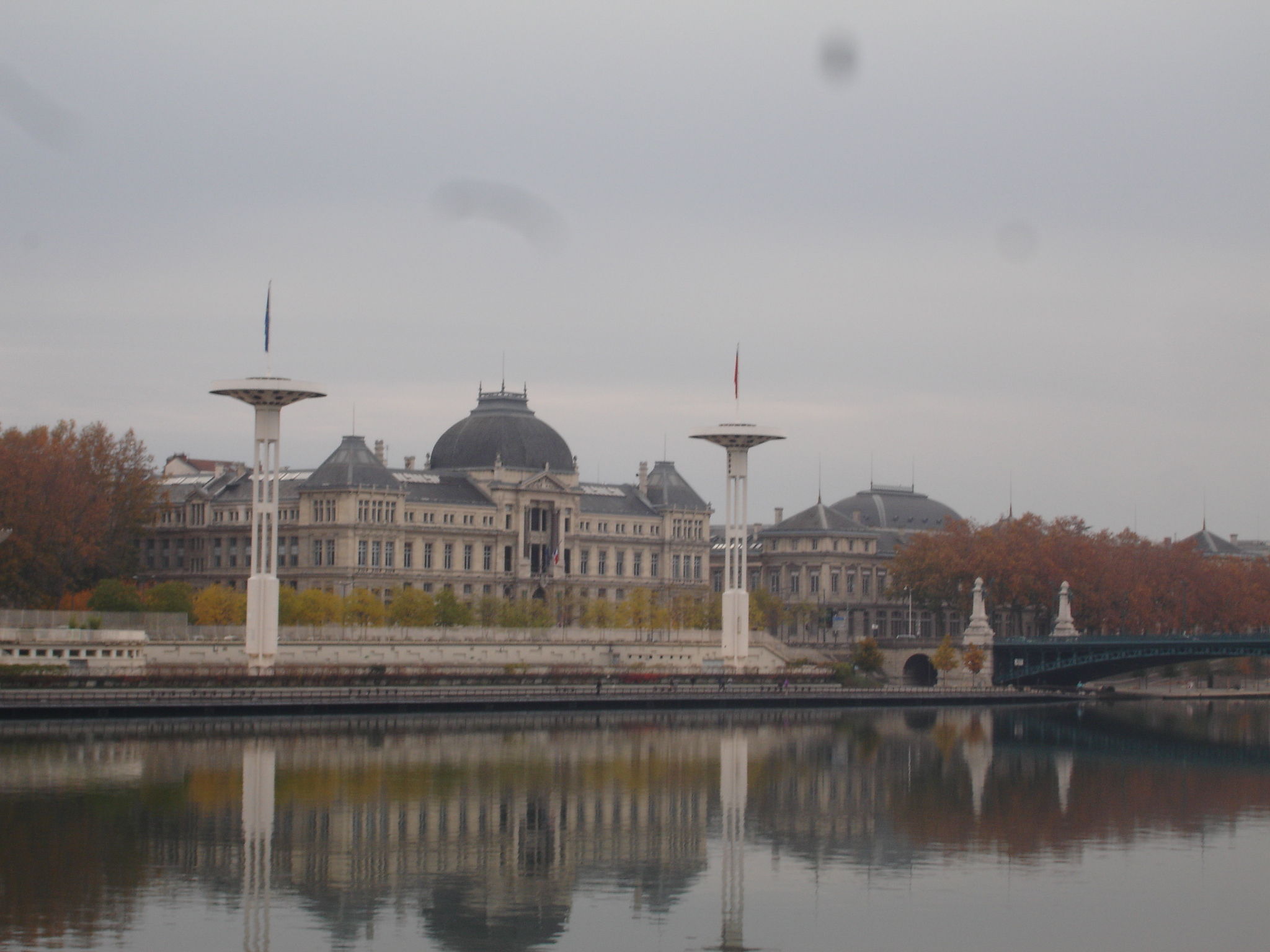
Quai Claude Bernard

The following quays were developed on the left bank of the Rhône:

- Quai Charles de Gaulle – Brotteaux
- Avenue de Grande-Bretagne – Brotteaux
- Quai de Serbie – Brotteaux
- Quai du général Sarrail – Brotteaux
- Quai Victor-Augagneur – La Part-Dieu
- Quai Claude Bernard – Montplaisir
- Avenue Leclerc – Gerland
- Quai Fillon – Gerland

== See also ==
- Bridges of Lyon
- Parks in Lyon
- Parc de la Feyssine

== Bibliography ==
- Communauté urbaine de Lyon (1992), "schéma d'aménagement des Berges de la Saône et du Rhône", Plan bleu (in French), Communauté Urbaine de Lyon, p. 77
- Desgrandchamps, Valérie (2009), Les berges du Rhône à Lyon (in French), S. Bachès, p. 85, ISBN 978-2-35752-017-2
