= Grand parc de Miribel-Jonage =

Park in Lyon, France

Coordinates: 45.8058°N 4.9364°E

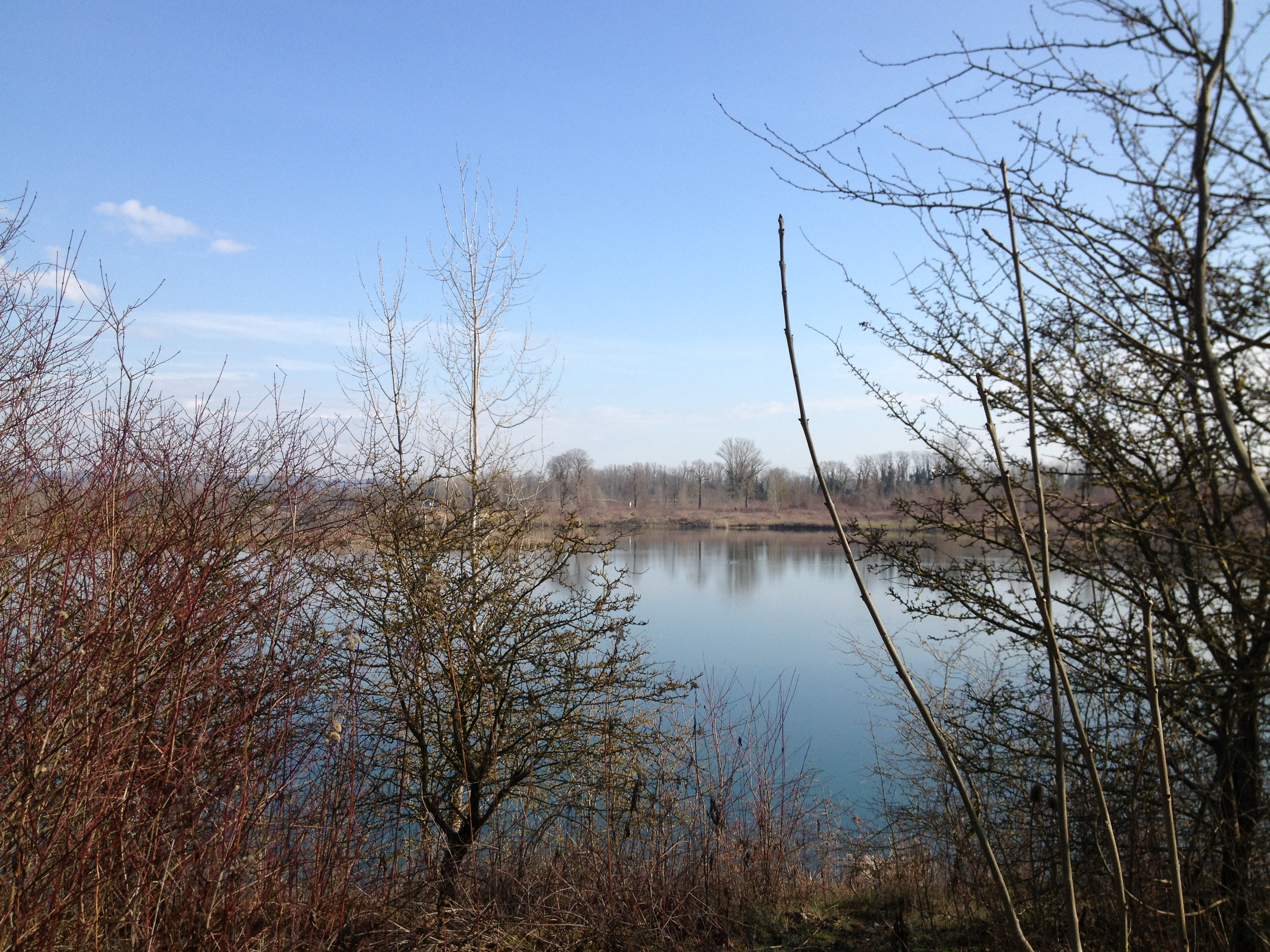
Nature view, Grand Parc de Miribel-Jonage, France

The Grand parc de Miribel-Jonage (French pronunciation: [ɡʁɑ̃ paʁk də miʁibɛl ʒɔnaʒ]) is an urban park covering almost 2,200 hectares on the outskirts of Lyon. It covers most of the Island of Miribel-Jonage on the Rhône. This island was created in the 19th century with the digging of the Miribel and Jonage canals to help control the flooding of the Rhône.

The park is a recreational area for the inhabitants of Greater Lyon, and also includes wildlife protection zones for fauna and flora. The park provides two other functions: to be the backup drinking water resource of Lyon, and it provides a buffer flood zone in case of the Rhône flooding.

== See also ==
- Parc de Gerland
- Parc de Parilly
- Parc de la Tête d'Or
- Parks in Lyon
