= Parks in Lyon =

The city of Lyon and its urban area have several parks. The main parks in the inner city include Jardin des Chartreux in the 1st arrondissement, Parc Bazin, Parc Chambovet and Parc Sisley in the 3rd arrondissement, Parc de la Cerisaie, Parc Francis Popy and Jardin Rosa Mir in the 4th arrondissement, Jardin des Curiosités, Parc de la garde and Parc des Hauteurs in the 5th arrondissement, Parc de la Tête d'or in the 6th arrondissement, Parc Henry Chabert, Parc des berges du Rhône and Parc Sergent Blandan in the 7th arrondissement, and Parc de Montpellas, Parc Montel and Parc du Vallon in the 9th arrondissement.

In the greater urban area, some large parks include Parc de la Feyssine, Parc de la Commune de Paris and Parc René-Dumont in Villeurbanne, Parc de Parilly in the territory of Bron and Vénissieux, Parc de Lacroix-Laval in Marcy-l'Étoile, Parc Saint-Clair in Caluire-et-Cuire, Parc du Brûlet in Sainte-Foy-lès-Lyon, and the 2,200-hectare (5,400-acre) Grand Parc de Miribel-Jonage, in the north-east of the city.

== See also ==
- Arrondissements of Lyon
- Berges du Rhône
