= Parc de la Feyssine =

Park in Lyon, France

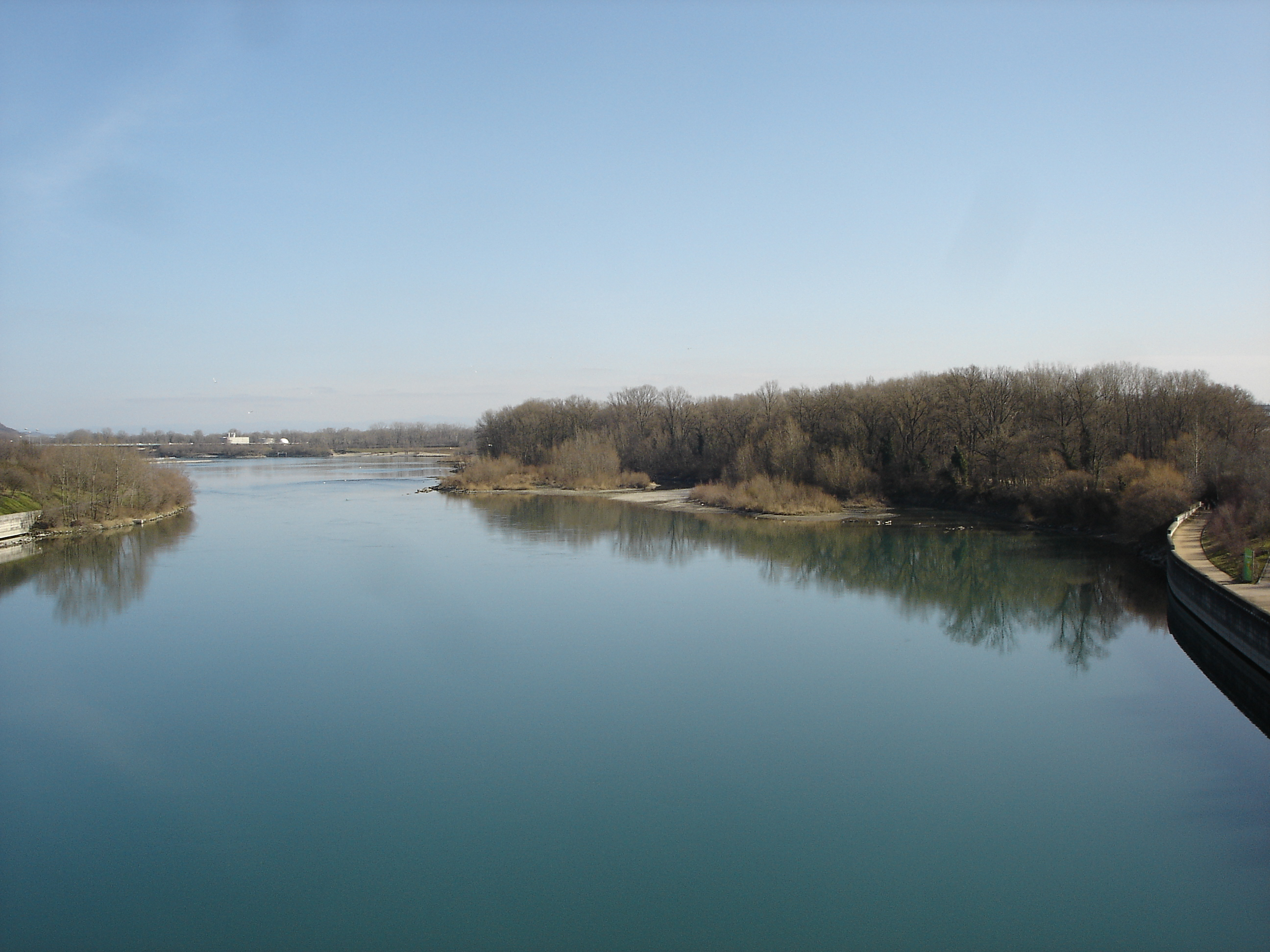
- View of the park from the Raymond Poincaré bridge
- Interactive map of Parc de la Feyssine
- Type: Urban park
- Location: Villeurbanne, France
- Coordinates: 45.7867°N 4.8728°E
- Area: 55 hectares (0.55 km^{2})
- Created: 2002
- Status: Open all year

The Parc de la Feyssine (French pronunciation: [paʁk də la fɛsin]) is a park in Lyon, France.

Situated between the Rhone river and the college campus of La Doua in Villeurbanne and to the north of Lyon, Parc de la Feyssine was created on former marshlands to serve as a passage from Parc de la Tête d'or to the Grand Parc de Miribel-Jonage. Opened in 2002, it is wooded over 50% of its surface, and has trails for walking, mountain biking and running, including a circular path and the "chemin hectomètrique", a path with informational exhibits every 100m.

== See also ==
- Berges du Rhône
- Parks in Lyon
