= La Tour-de-Salvagny =

- Commune
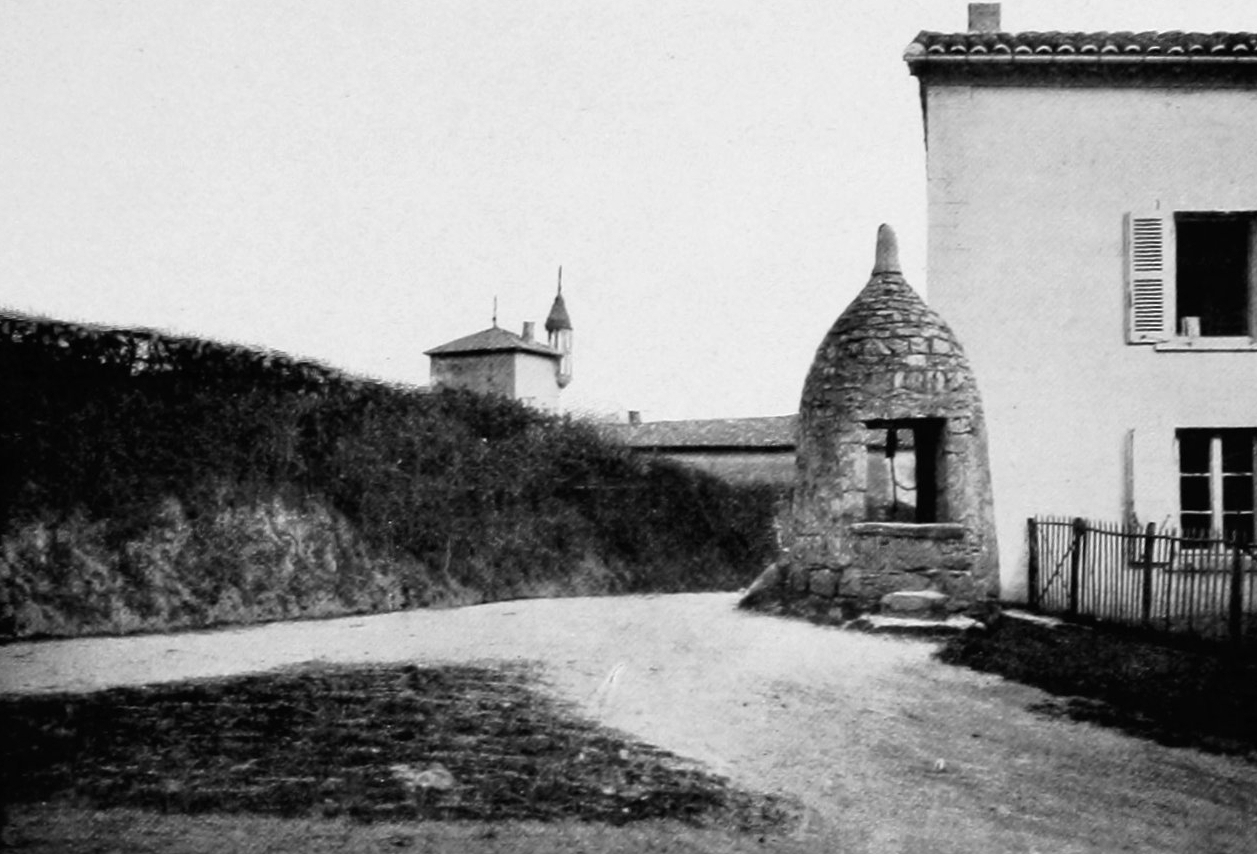
- La-Tour-de-Salvagny, in the early 20th century

- Coat of arms
- Location of La Tour-de-Salvagny
- Location within France Location within Auvergne-Rhône-Alpes
- Coordinates: 45°48′50″N 4°43′01″E
- Country: France
- Region: Auvergne-Rhône-Alpes
- Metropolis: Lyon Metropolis
- Arrondissement: Lyon

Government
  - Mayor (2020–2026): Gilles Pillon
- Area^{1}: 8.43 km^{2} (3.25 sq mi)
- Elevation: 266 m (873 ft)
- Highest elevation: 352 m (1,155 ft)
- Lowest elevation: 240 m (790 ft)
- Population (2023): 4,649
  - Density: 551/km^{2} (1,430/sq mi)
- Time zone: UTC+01:00 (CET)
  - Summer (DST): UTC+02:00 (CEST)
- INSEE/Postal code: 69250 /69890
- ^{1} French Land Register data, which excludes lakes, ponds, glaciers > 1 km^{2} (0.386 sq mi or 247 acres) and river estuaries.

La Tour-de-Salvagny (French pronunciation: [la tuʁ də salvaɲi]) is a commune in the Metropolis of Lyon in Auvergne-Rhône-Alpes region in eastern France. It borders Parc de Lacroix-Laval in Marcy-l'Étoile.

== Population ==
Historical population
Year	Pop.	±% p.a.
1968	1,367	—
1975	1,904	+4.85%
1982	2,827	+5.81%
1990	3,226	+1.66%
1999	3,402	+0.59%
2007	3,476	+0.27%
2012	3,851	+2.07%
2017	4,050	+1.01%
2023	4,649	+2.33%
Source: INSEE

== See also ==
- Communes of the Metropolis of Lyon
