= Charbonnières-les-Bains =

- Commune
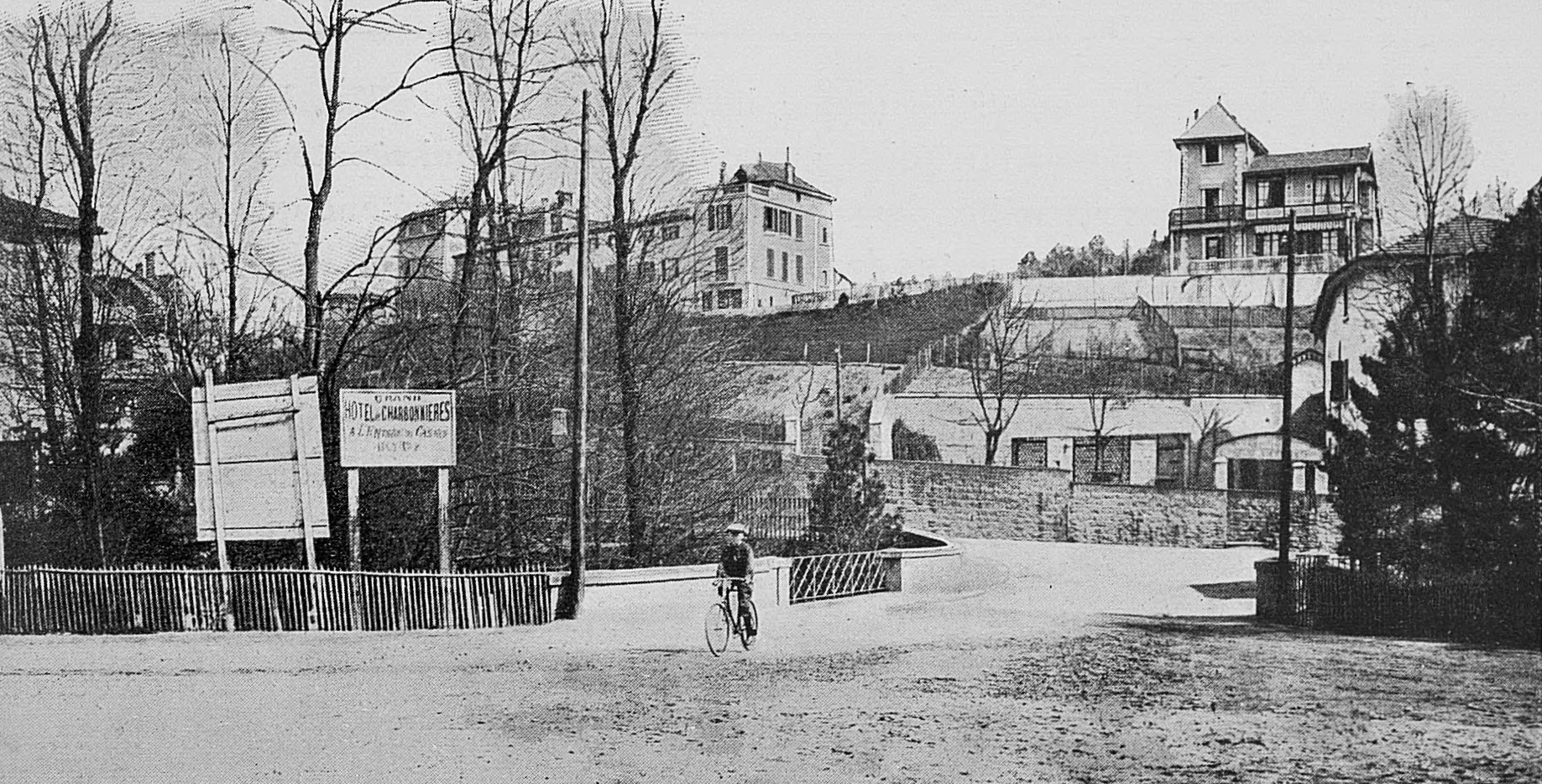
- Charbonnières-les-Bains in the early 20th century
- Location of Charbonnières-les-Bains
- Location within France Location within Auvergne-Rhône-Alpes
- Coordinates: 45°46′52″N 4°44′49″E
- Country: France
- Region: Auvergne-Rhône-Alpes
- Metropolis: Lyon Metropolis
- Arrondissement: Lyon

Government
  - Mayor (2020–2026): Gérald Eymard
- Area^{1}: 4.13 km^{2} (1.59 sq mi)
- Elevation: 233 m (764 ft)
- Highest elevation: 295 m (968 ft)
- Lowest elevation: 211 m (692 ft)
- Population (2023): 5,383
  - Density: 1,300/km^{2} (3,380/sq mi)
- Time zone: UTC+01:00 (CET)
  - Summer (DST): UTC+02:00 (CEST)
- INSEE/Postal code: 69044 /69260
- ^{1} French Land Register data, which excludes lakes, ponds, glaciers > 1 km^{2} (0.386 sq mi or 247 acres) and river estuaries.

Charbonnières-les-Bains (French pronunciation: [ʃaʁbɔnjɛʁ le bɛ̃]; Arpitan: Charboniéres) is a commune in the Metropolis of Lyon in Auvergne-Rhône-Alpes region in eastern France. It borders Parc de Lacroix-Laval in Marcy-l'Étoile.

== Population ==
Historical population
Year	Pop.	±% p.a.
1968	2,448	—
1975	3,086	+3.36%
1982	3,973	+3.68%
1990	4,033	+0.19%
1999	4,377	+0.91%
2007	4,782	+1.11%
2012	4,851	+0.29%
2017	5,067	+0.88%
2023	5,383	+1.01%
Source: INSEE
