= Hôtel de Ville, Caluire-et-Cuire =

Town hall in Caluire-et-Cuire, France

Hôtel de Ville
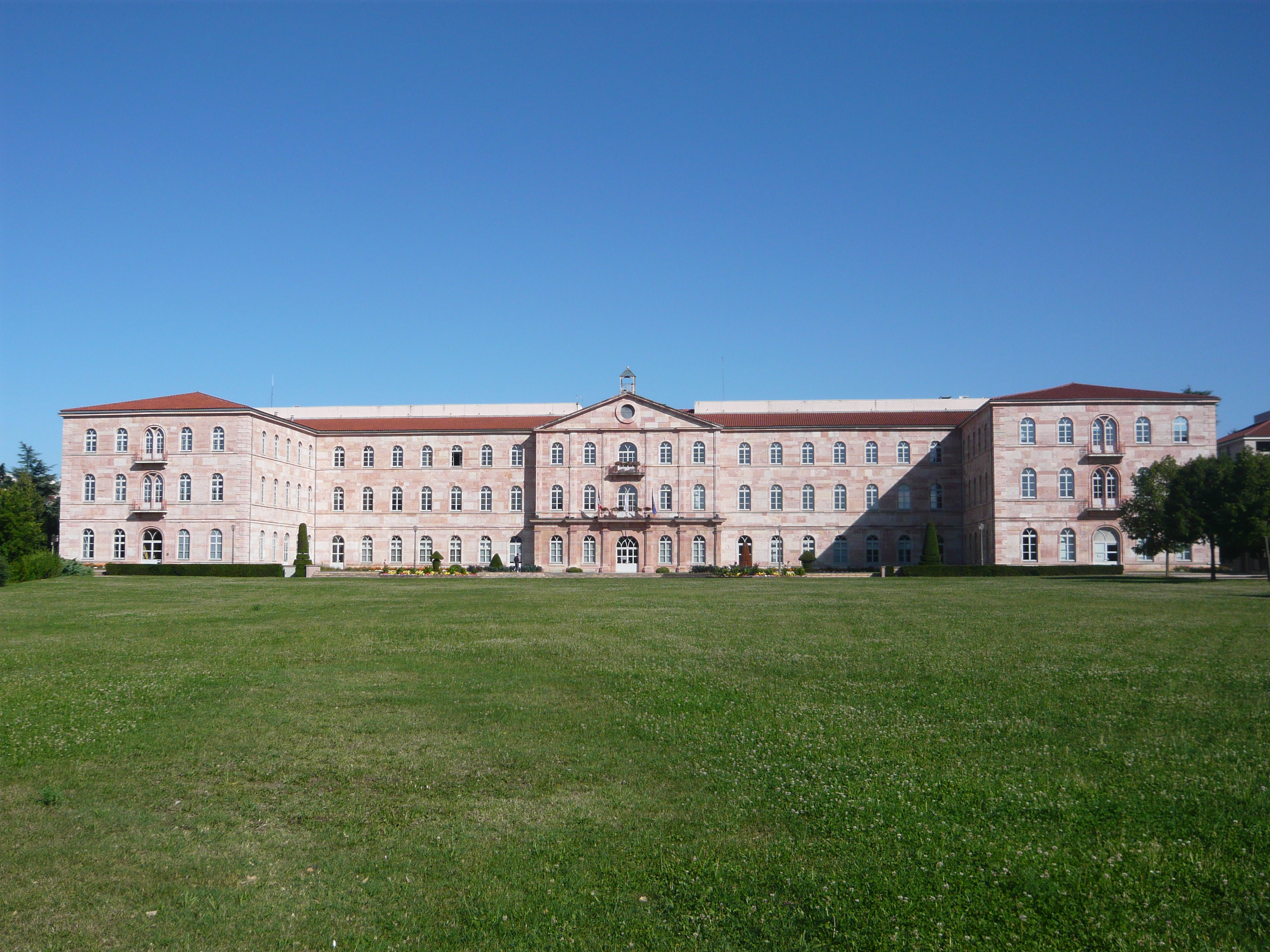
- The main frontage of the Hôtel de Ville in July 2008

General information
- Type: City hall
- Architectural style: Neoclassical style
- Location: Caluire-et-Cuire, France
- Coordinates: 45.7970°N 4.8423°E
- Completed: 1846

Height
- Height: 20 metres (66 ft)

Design and construction
- Architect: Brother Pasquier

Monument historique
- Official name: Maison des Frères des Ecoles chrétiennes (ancienne)
- Type: Inscrit
- Designated: 1982
- Reference no.: PA00117728

The Hôtel de Ville (French pronunciation: [otɛl də vil], City Hall) is a municipal building in Caluire-et-Cuire, Metropolis of Lyon, in eastern France, standing on Place du Docteur Frédéric Dugoujon. It was designated a monument historique by the French government in 1982.

== History ==
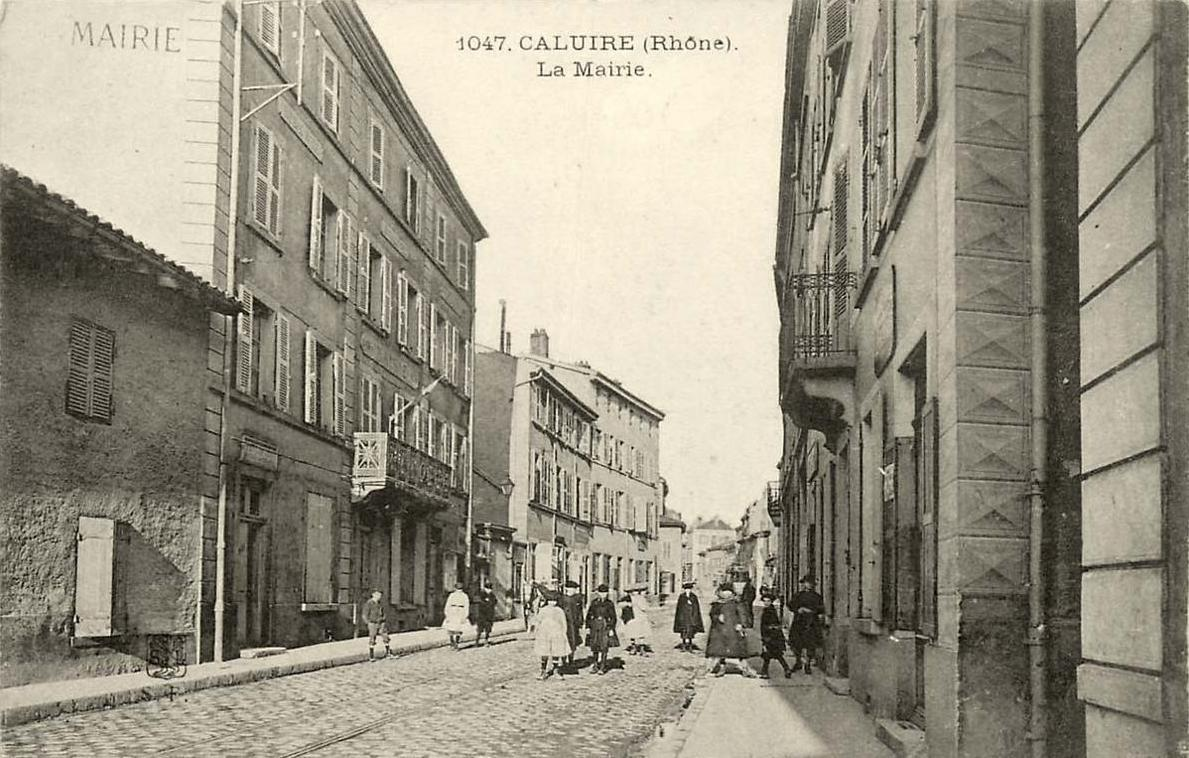
The old town hall on Montée Castellane (on the left)

In the mid-17th century, the area between Rue Coste and the River Saône in Caluire was occupied by a large château which was the home of Jean Gay and his wife, Antoinette Dubreuil. It was later acquired by a merchant of Lyon, Claude Voiret, before being inherited by his daughter-in-law, Isabeau Trunel. Trunel sold it to a lawyer, Jacques Perrichon; his descendent, Agathe Perrichon married Barthélémy Gubian, advisor to the king. The building was raided by revolutionaries and its archives burnt during the French Revolution, and it was then converted into a hospital for use by the army of the National Convention during the Revolt of Lyon in 1793.

The house and its surrounding vineyards were later briefly owned by the industrialist, François Coignet. In 1844, the Institute of the Brothers of the Christian Schools, decided to commission a school for the area and acquired the site from Coignet. The building was designed by Brother Pasquier in the neoclassical style, built in ashlar stone and was officially opened on 12 October 1846. The stone for the main façade was quarried in Préty.

The design involved a symmetrical main frontage of 29 bays facing towards the river, with the end sections of five bays each projected forward as pavilions. The central section of five bays, which was slightly projected forward, featured a round headed doorway with a keystone and moulded surround on the ground floor, and rounded headed French doors with keystones and moulded surrounds on the upper floors. The bays in the central section were flanked by Doric order pilasters supporting a pediment with an oculus in the tympanum. The other bays were all fenestrated by rounded headed windows with keystones and moulded surrounds. The central bays in the end sections featured mullioned windows. The main frontage was 110 metres (360 ft) long and 20 metres (66 ft) high.

The building was requisitioned by the French Army for use as military barracks during the Franco-Prussian War in 1870, and the compensation the brothers received was used to fund the construction of the Chapel of Saint-Joseph, to a design by Louis Sainte-Marie Perrin, at the rear of the main building in 1885. During the First World War, the main building was used as a 370-bed military hospital, and it was put to similar use in the Second World War.

Meanwhile, after finding the old town hall on Montée Castellane dilapidated, (Note: The old town hall was a former private house acquired in 1821.) the town council acquired the building on Place du Docteur Frédéric Dugoujon in 1972. After the interior of the building had been substantially rebuilt, the building was officially re-opened by the mayor, Bernard Roger-Dalbert, on 3 April 1992. In August 2015, the building became the main location in the town for family registration services.
