= Jardin des Curiosités =

Park in Lyon, France

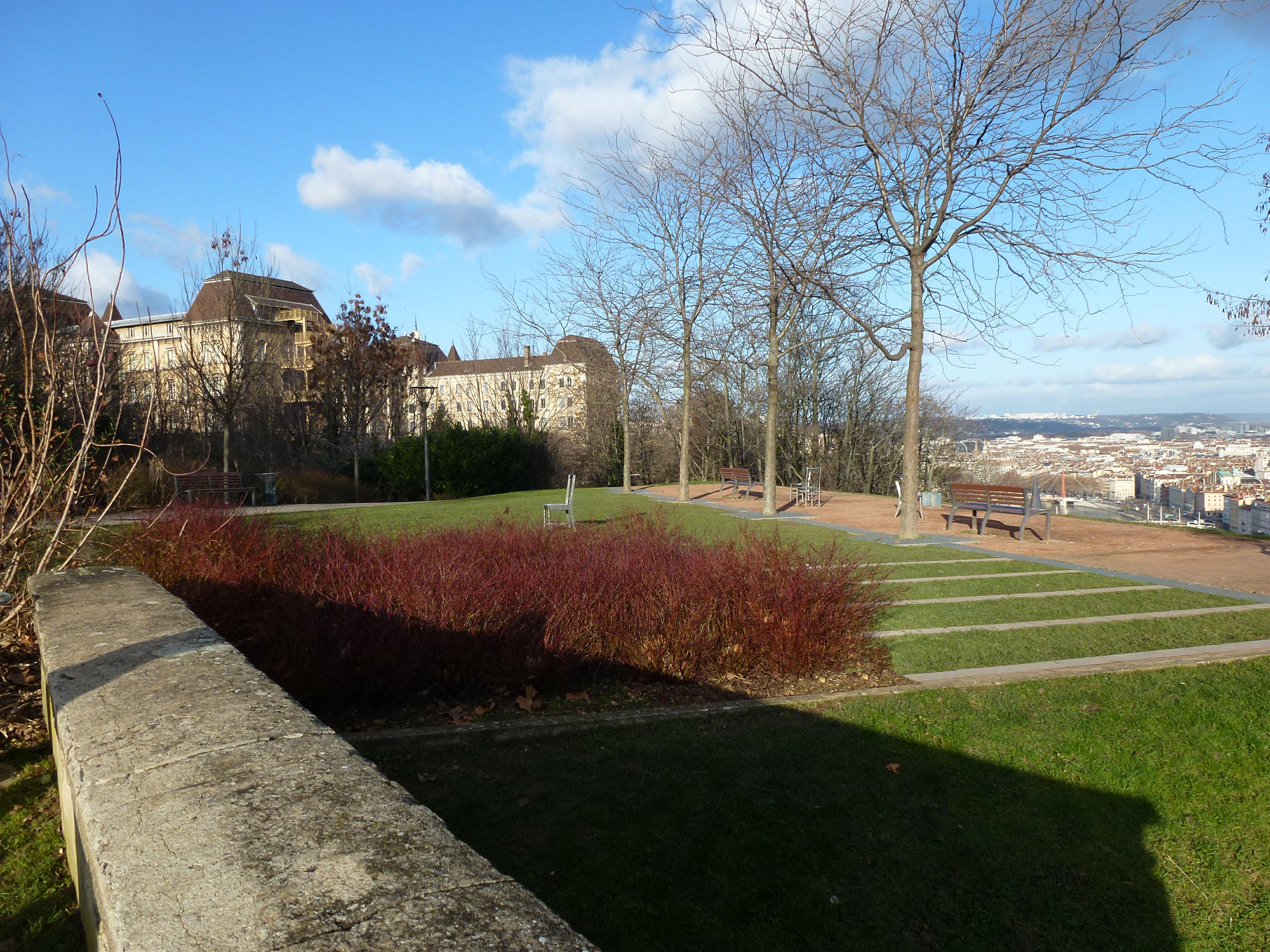
- View from the south end of the park
- Type: Urban park
- Location: Saint-Just (5th arrondissement of Lyon)
- Coordinates: 45.7549°N 4.8218°E
- Area: 0.6 hectares (1.5 acres)
- Elevation: 232 metres (761 ft)
- Created: 2000
- Open: 8 am–7 pm daily
- Website: Official site of the City of Lyon

Jardin des Curiosités (French pronunciation: [ʒaʁdɛ̃ de kyʁjozite], lit. 'Garden of Curiosities') is a 6,000-square-metre (65,000 sq ft) park in Saint-Just, Lyon. It is also called Jardin de Montréal, Belvédère Abbé Larue, Jardin de proximité Montréal and Jardin du Belvédère. It is situated at an altitude of 232 metres (761 ft) at the east end of place Abbé-Larue.

== History ==
The park was a gift from the city of Montréal, to mark the twentieth anniversary of the designation of Montréal and Lyon as sister cities. The park was opened to visitors in August 2001.

Designers include Québécois sculptor Michel Goulet, a Montréal-based architectural and urban design agency founded by Réal Lestage and Renée Daoust, and the Canadian company "Vlan Paysages", directed by Julie Saint-Arnault and Micheline Clouard.

== Features ==
The park is situated on Fourvière hill with a panoramic view of Lyon. There are six chair sculptures created by Michel Goulet, with inscriptions suggesting ways to contemplate the "real", the "absent" and the "imagined".

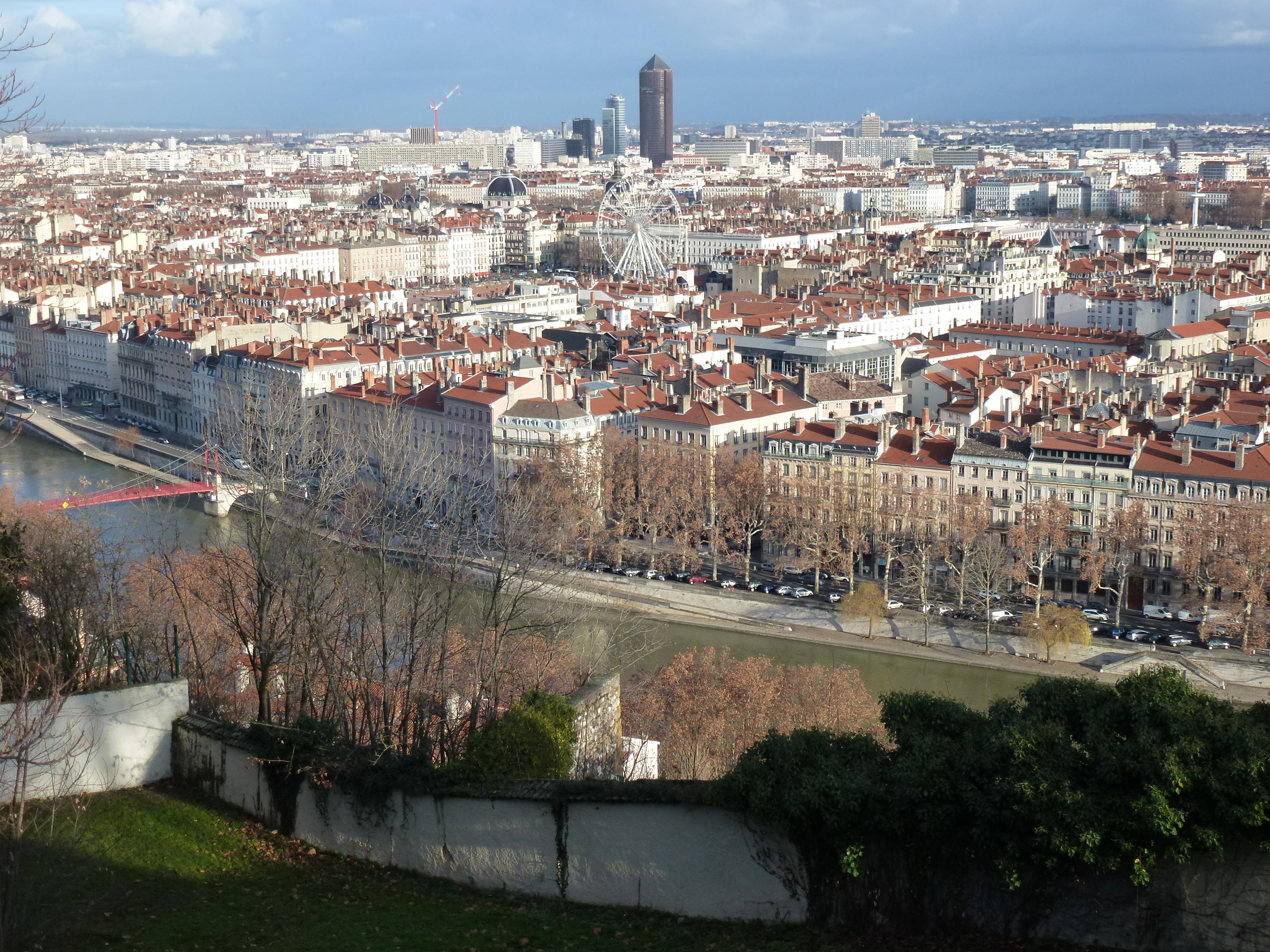
View of Lyon from the park

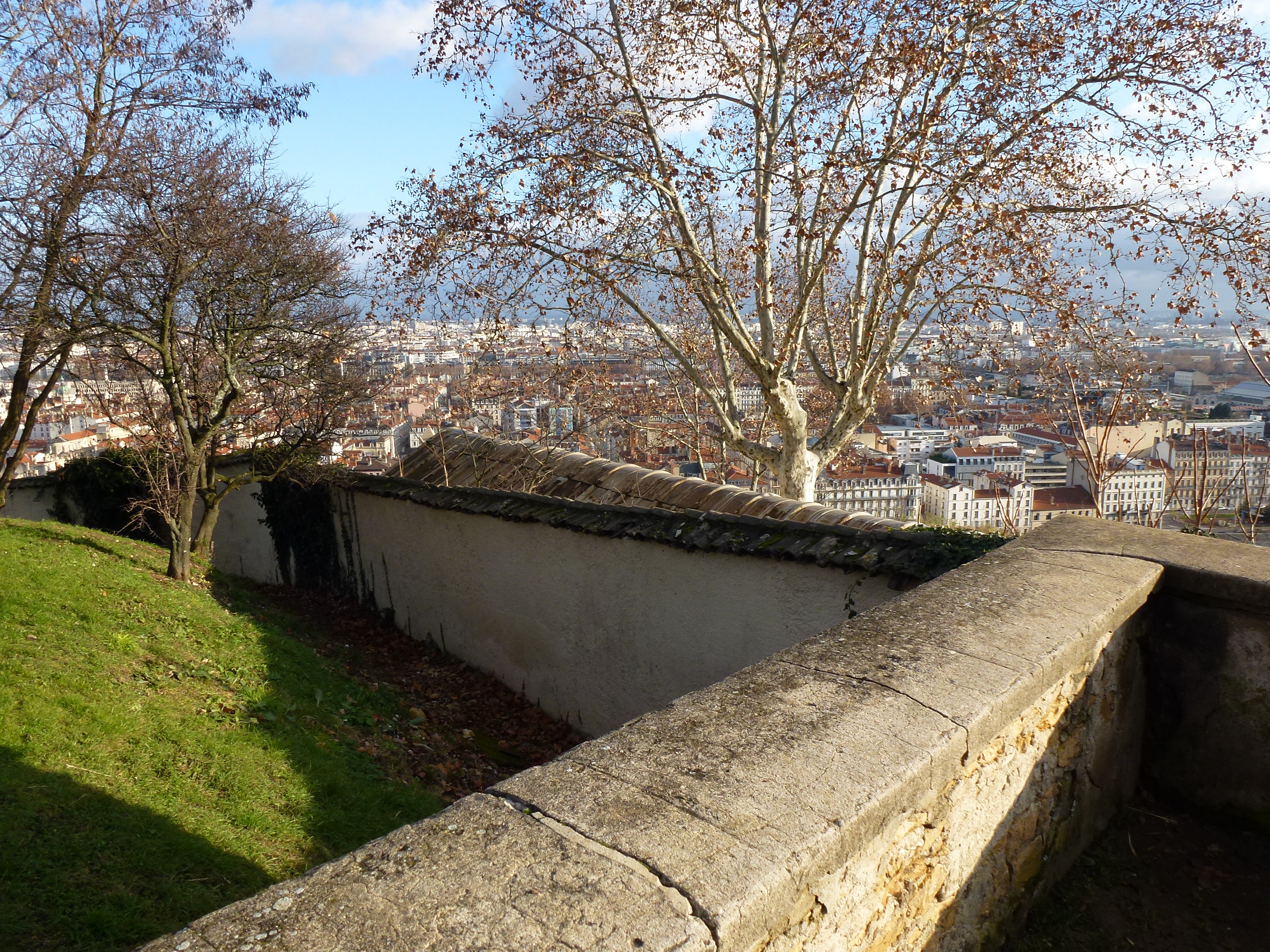
The wall surrounding the park

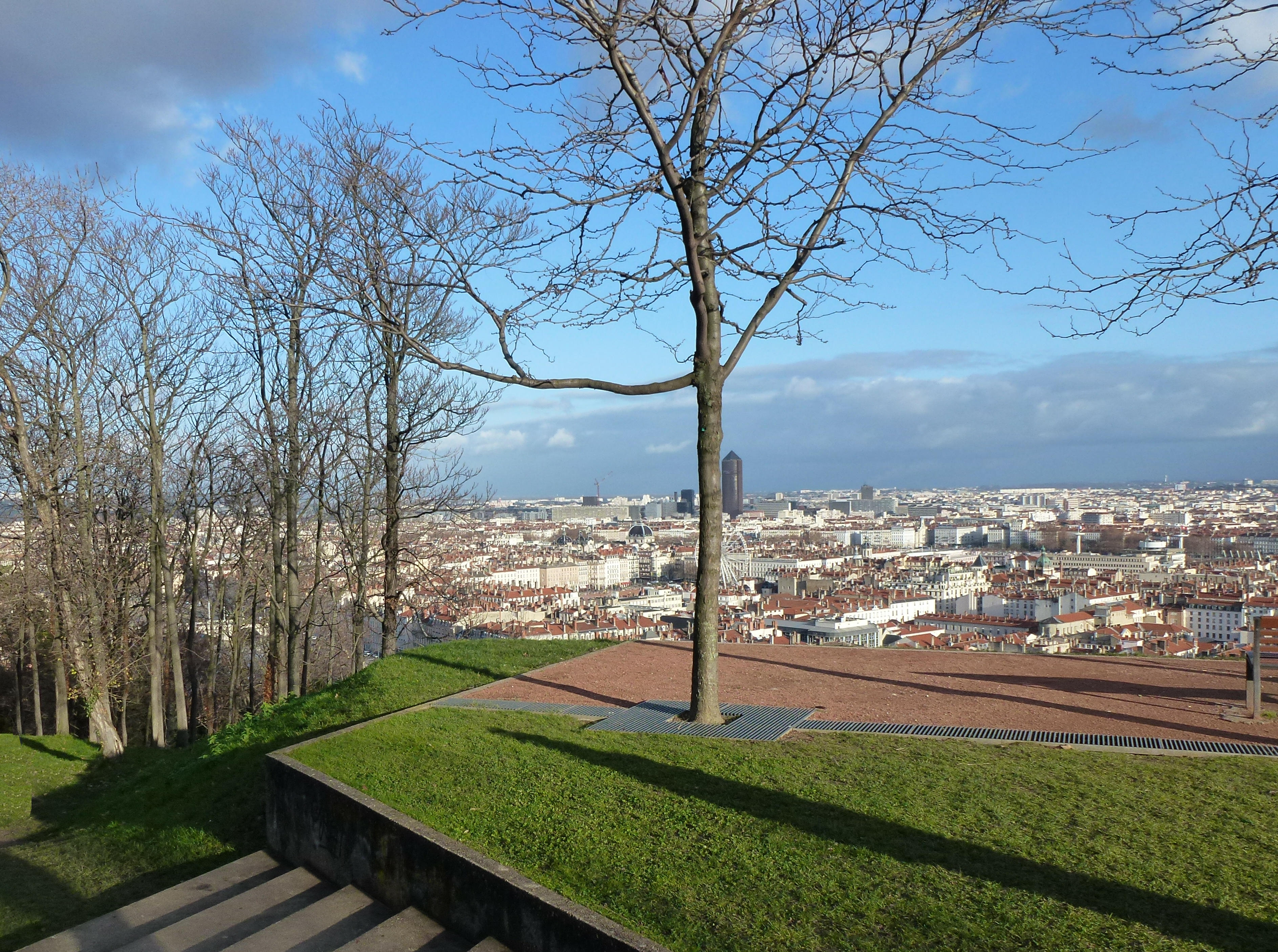
Terrasse and slopes

== See also ==
- Parks in Lyon
