= Parc de Lacroix-Laval =

Domaine de Lacroix-Laval
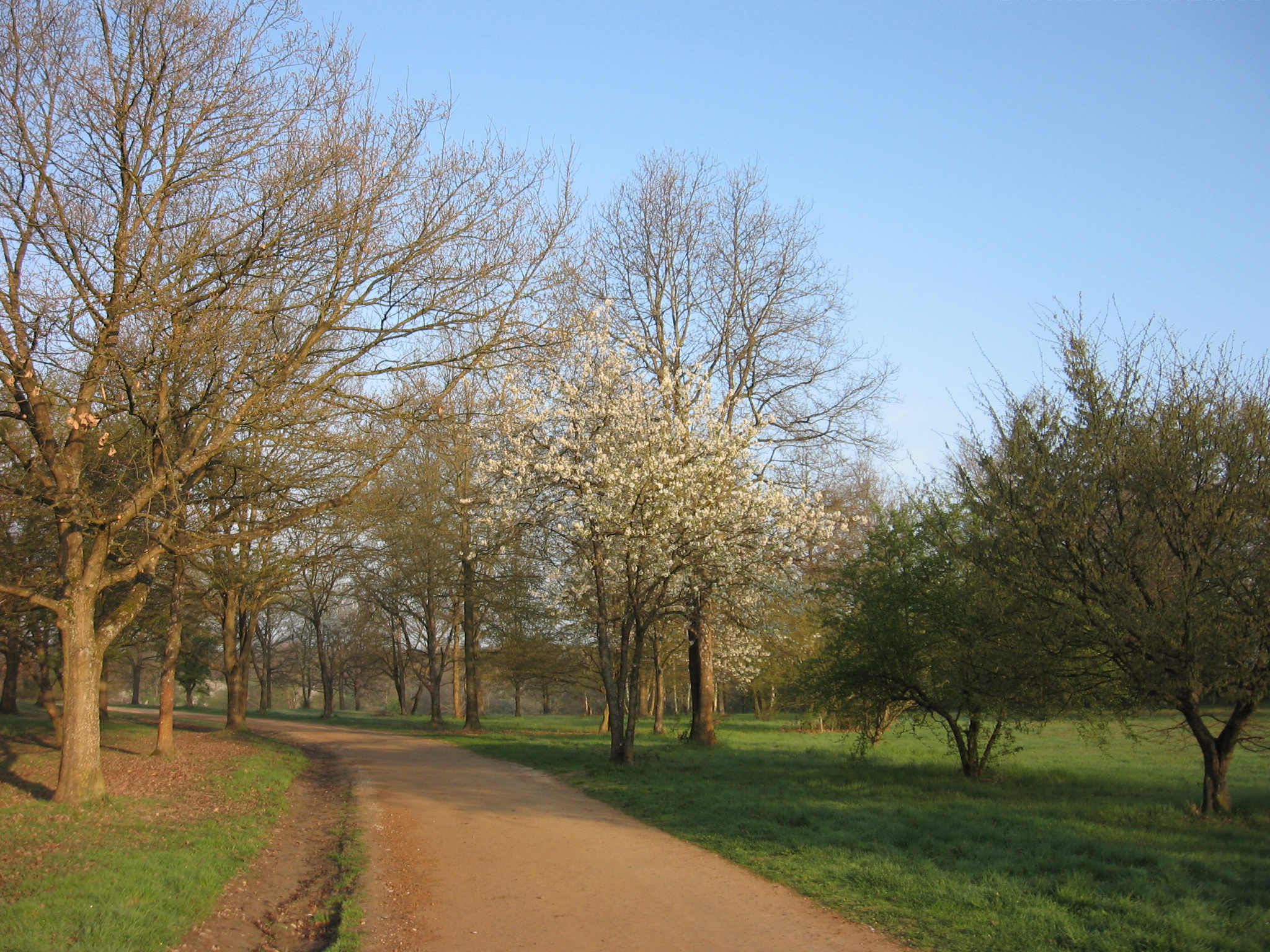
- Parc de Lacroix-Laval
- Interactive map of Domaine de Lacroix-Laval
- Location: Marcy-l'Étoile, Lyon Metropolis, France
- Coordinates: 45.787487°N 4.7215891°E
- Area: 115 hectares (280 acres)
- Created: 1985
- Public transit: Casino-Lacroix-Laval station
- Website: www.grandlyon.com/parc/domaine-de-lacroix-laval

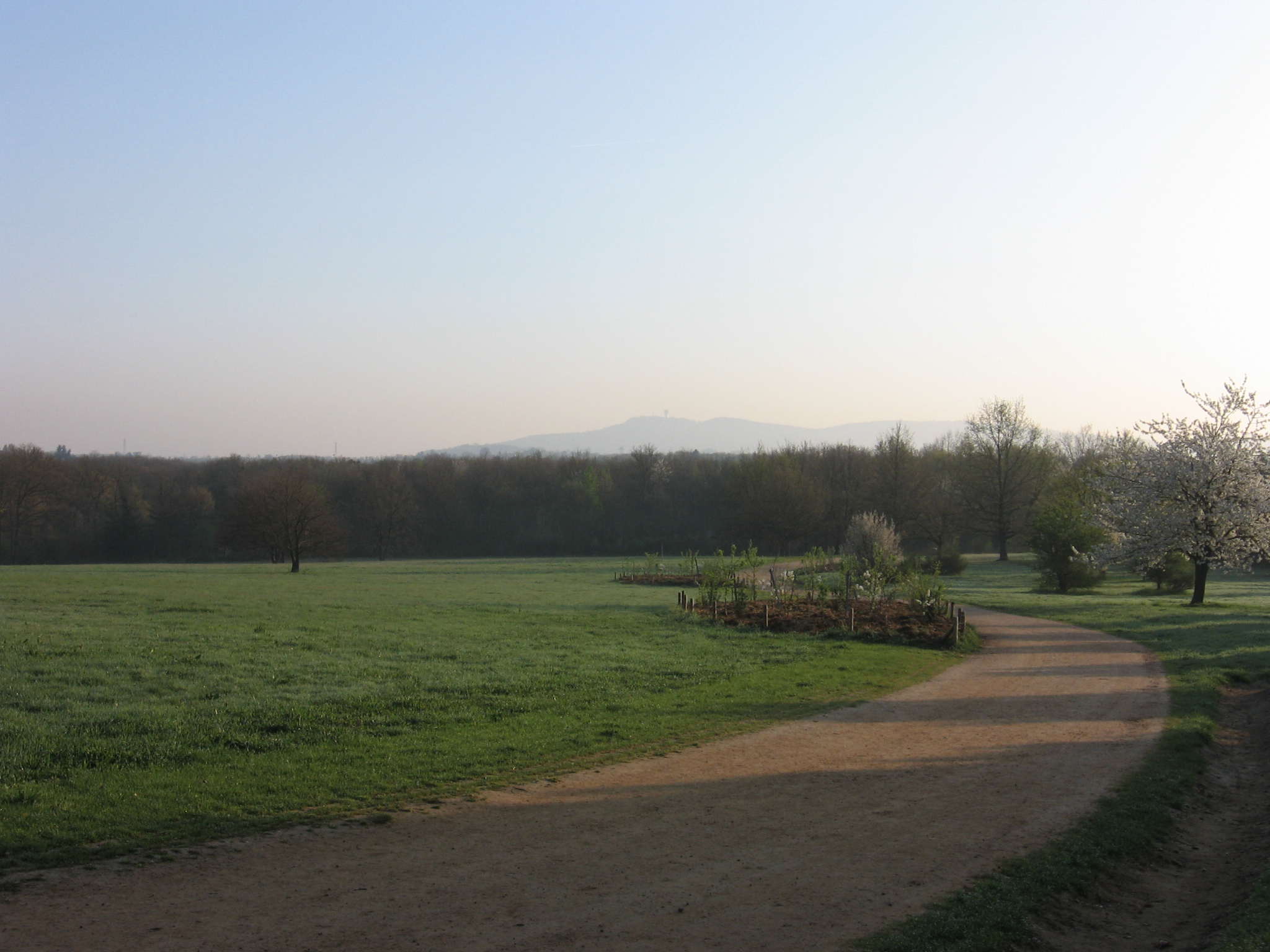
Parc de Lacroix-Laval

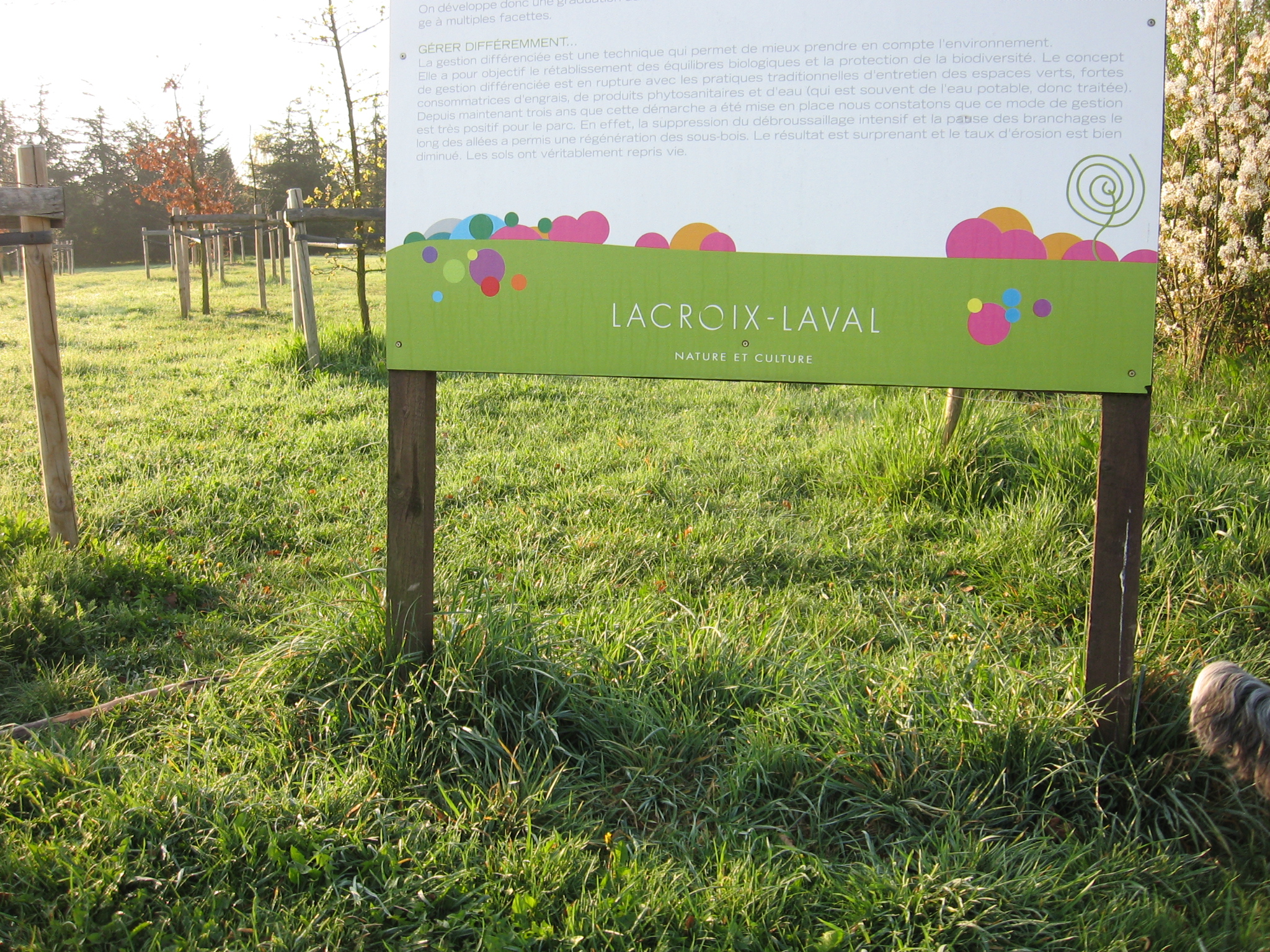
Parc de Lacroix-Laval

Parc de Lacroix-Laval or Domaine de Lacroix-Laval is a park in the commune of Marcy-l'Étoile, Lyon Metropolis, France. Opened to the public in 1985 it lies entirely within the limits of Marcy-l'Étoile but borders the communes of Charbonnières-les-Bains and la Tour-de-Salvagny.

== Design & features ==
The park encompasses 115 hectares (280 acres) of partially wooded land. Château de Lacroix-Laval and "The National Institute of Labor, Employment and Vocational Training" (L'institut National du Travail, de l'Emploi et de la Formation Professionnelle, or INTEFP) are located inside the park.

The park became part of the Lyon Metropolis on 1 January 2015.

== See also ==
- Parks in Lyon
