= Parc Sergent Blandan =

Urban park in Lyon, France

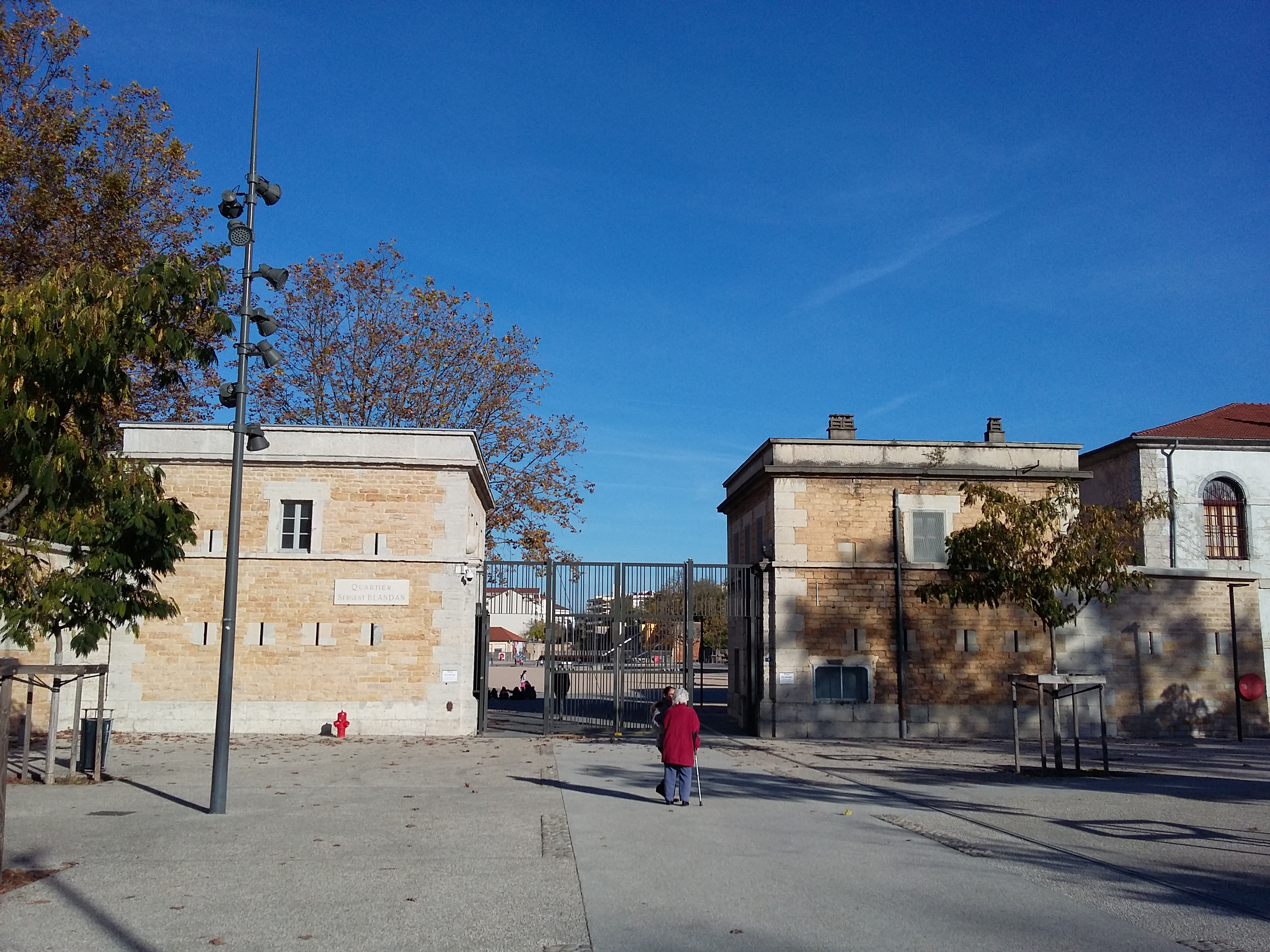
- Park entrance
- Interactive map of Parc Sergent Blandan
- Type: Urban park
- Location: 7th arrondissement of Lyon, Lyon
- Coordinates: 45.745°N 4.854°E
- Area: 17 hectares (42 acres)
- Website: Official website

Parc Sergent Blandan (French pronunciation: [paʁk sɛʁʒɑ̃ blɑ̃dɑ̃]), also shortened to Parc Blandan, is an urban park in the 7th arrondissement of Lyon in Lyon, France, adjacent to Cimetière de la Guillotière Ancien. With an area of 17 hectares (42 acres), the park opened to the public on 13 September 2013 at the location of Caserne sergent Blandan, a military barracks previously known as "Fort Lamothe".

The park has three distinct areas: a multi-purpose square to the north, an ecological area to the south, and a central garden that surrounds the barracks' ramparts. The park also contains a large skatepark.

It's the third largest park in Lyon after Parc de la Tête d'or and Parc de Gerland.

== See also ==
- Parks in Lyon
