= Parc Saint-Clair =

Park in Lyon, France

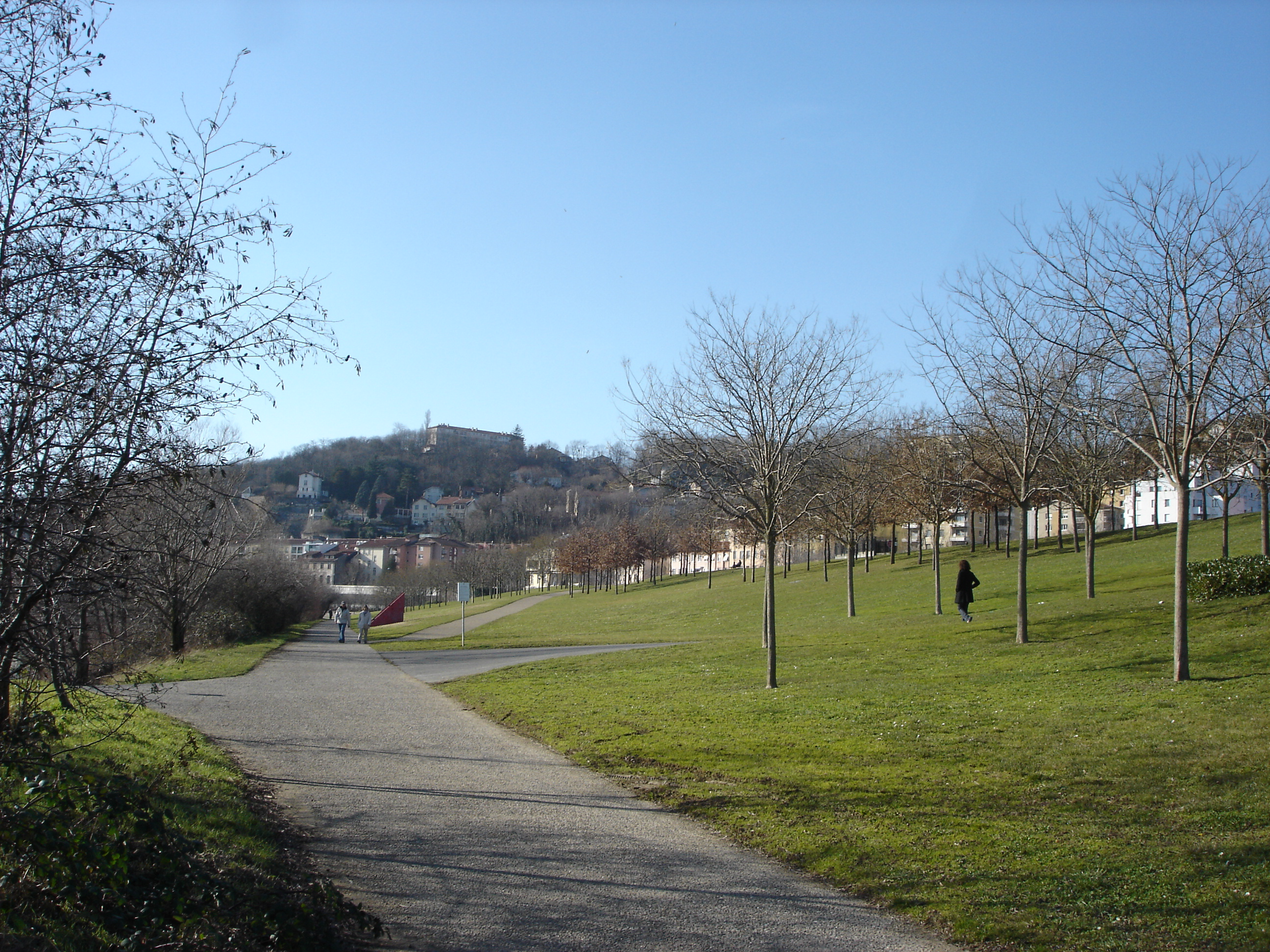
- Interactive map of Parc Saint-Clair
- Type: Urban park
- Location: Caluire-et-Cuire, Lyon, France
- Coordinates: 45.788°N 4.857°E
- Area: 4 hectares (9.9 acres)

Parc Saint-Clair (French pronunciation: [paʁk sɛ̃ klɛʁ]) is a public greenspace in the quarter of Saint-Clair in the commune Caluire-et-Cuire near Lyon. The park has an area of 4 hectares (9.9 acres), is bordered by the Rhône to the south and the Boulevard périphérique de Lyon to the north and east.

It was designed by landscape architect Alain Provost.

== See also ==
- Parks in Lyon
