= Parc de la Tête d'or =

Largest urban park in Lyon, France

Parc de la Tête d'Or
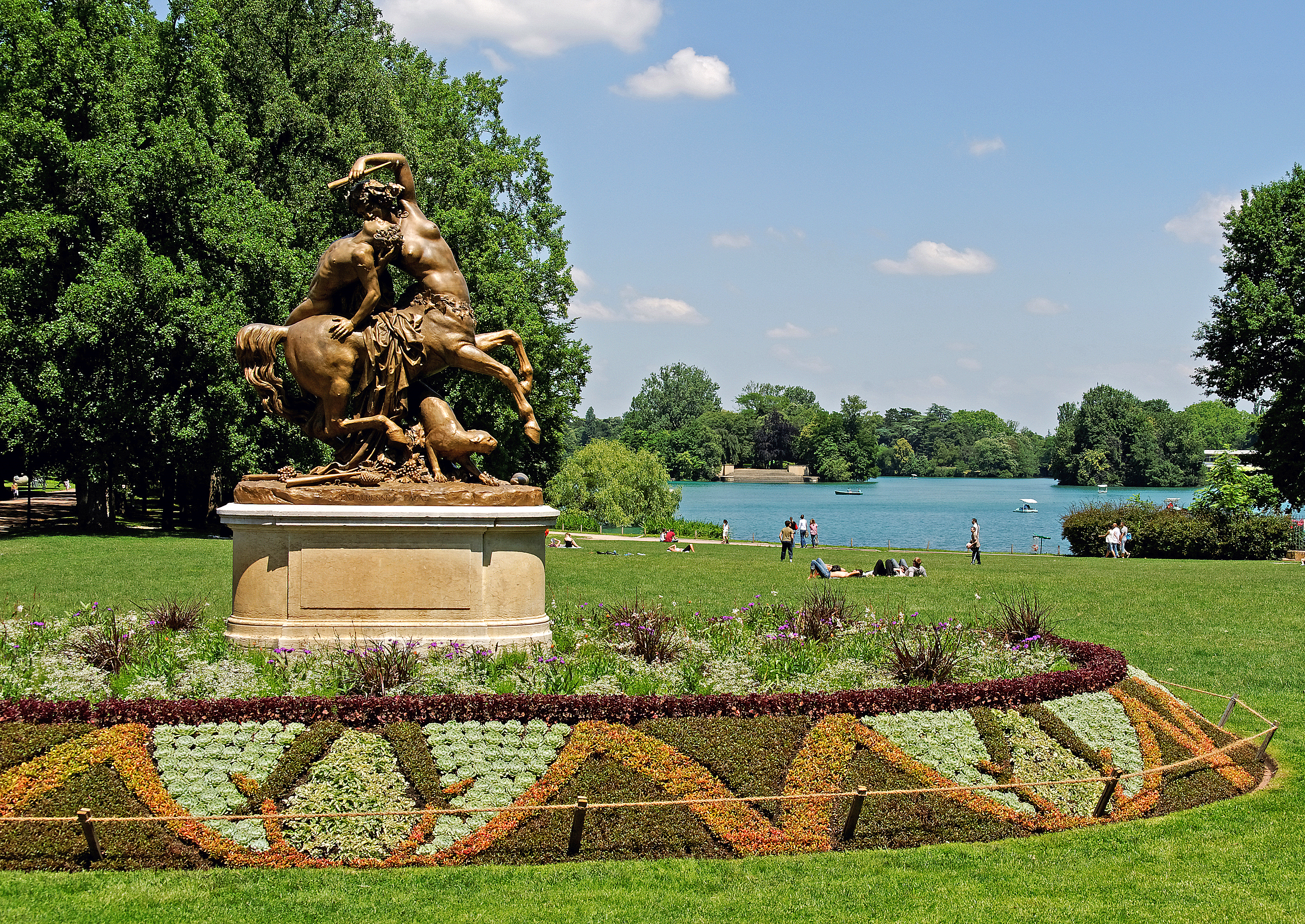
- View of the Lac de la Tête-d'Or (Lake of the Head of Gold) from near the Porte des Enfants du Rhône (Gate of the Children of Rhône), the main entrance
- Interactive map of Parc de la Tête d'Or
- Type: Urban park
- Location: Brotteaux, 6th arrondissement of Lyon, Lyon Metropolis
- Coordinates: 45.780°N 4.854°E
- Area: 117 hectares (290 acres)
- Created: 1857
- Public transit: Masséna (Metro Line A)
- Website: www.loisirs-parcdelatetedor.com

The Parc de la Tête d'Or (French pronunciation: [paʁk d(ə) la tɛt dɔʁ]; English: "Park of the Head of Gold") is the largest urban park in Lyon, France, with an area of approximately 117 hectares (290 acres). Located in the northern part of its 6th arrondissement, it features the Jardin botanique de Lyon, as well as a lake on which boating takes place during the summer months. Due to the relatively small number of other parks in Lyon, it receives a huge number of visitors over summer; it is a frequent destination for joggers and cyclists.

In the park's central part, there is a small zoo without charge, which includes giraffes, deer, reptiles, primates, along with other animals. There are also sports equipments, such as a velodrome, boules court, mini-golf and equestrian facility, in addition to a mini-train.

== History ==
=== Prior to the park's opening ===
In 1530, the lands constituting the current park were the property of the Lambert family; the location was already named "Parc de la Tête d'Or". In 1662, an archival document referred to the area called Grange Lambert. The name "Tête d'Or" was found from a legend saying that a treasure with a Christ's head could be buried in the park. The area was a flood zone composed of "lônes" (dead backwaters) of the Rhône and "brotteaux" (swamps). It remained like this until the park's creation.

=== A new and grand urban park ===
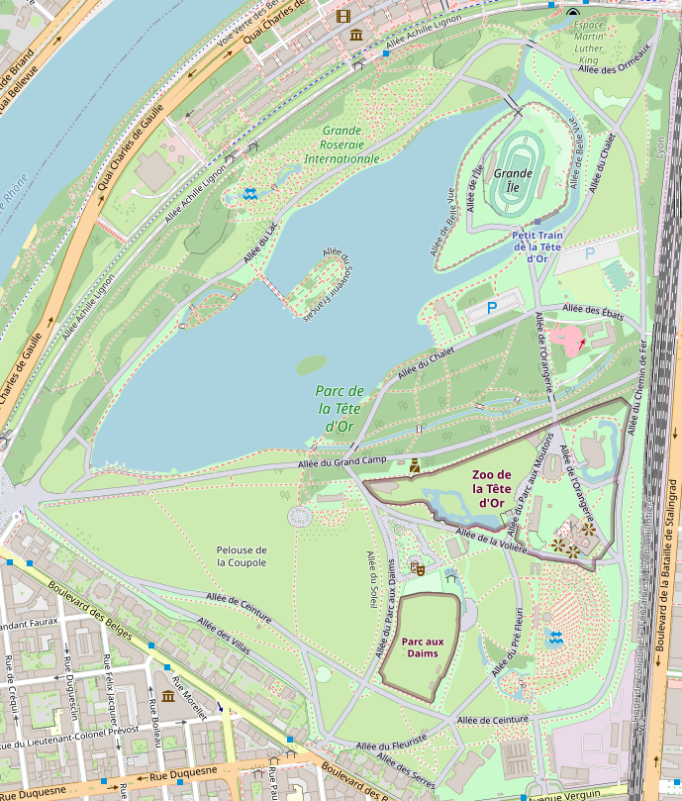
Map

From 1812, an urban park in Lyon was planned. Various locations were being considered, like the Presqu'île or the hill of Fourvière, and then finally, the grounds owned in large part by the Hospices civils de Lyon were chosen. In 1845, the architect Christophe Bonnet proposed, in the purpose of the beautification of the La Guillotière quarter, a project of urban park at the current location of the park: "To satisfy the pressing needs of a large population, I turned the lands and brush of the Parc de la Tête into a planted wood like the Bois de Boulogne." This idea was also presented by the Senator-Mayor Claude-Marius Vaïsse who wanted to create a park to "give the nature to those who don't have it". In 1856, the land was bought from the Hospices Civils de Lyon. Work on the park began in 1856, under the leadership of Swiss landscape designers Eugene and Denis Bulher and lasted five years. The park was finally opened in 1857, although at the time all the work was not yet completed. It was located in the northern district of Les Brotteaux, along the Rhône. A dam was built to make non-flooded vast lands transformed into a park.

=== Timeline ===
- 1857: Originally, the Jardin botanique de Lyon was created after a 1794 decree by the National Convention which required the establishment of Central Schools for cities of more than 300,000 inhabitants. These schools, which were to teach science, literature and the arts, had to have a botanical garden. Thus, Jean-Emmanuel Gilibert, then Mayor of Lyon, applied the decree in the city and created the botanical garden on the slopes of the Croix-Rousse. Completed in 1804 in the Couvent de la Déserte, the garden was too cramped and was therefore transferred to the park in 1857. It was then composed of more than 4,000 plants. The garden was located in the eastern park to not jeopardize the prospects of the park and break the effect produced by the large central lawn, at the south of the lake. A land for the experimental crops was developed for poaceae, fruit trees and medicinal plants. Now spread over seven hectares, the Jardin botanique de Lyon collections are as rich as that of the Muséum national d'histoire naturelle in Paris. The French rosarian Jean-Marie Gonod started his work here, producing his first cultivars in 1863.
- 1859: the orangery was moved from botanical garden on the slopes of the Croix-Rousse to the new park.
- 1861: creation of a boating activity on the lake. That year, the park had spaces devoted to the presentation of animals. The plan by brothers Bühler included original entries like a park with sheep, a pen of chickens and a cow pasture. Slowly, a zoological park was created by the arrival of exotic animals, construction and renovation of adapted facilities, the latest being the African plain, inaugurated in October 2006.
- 1865: construction of large greenhouses and greenhouse of agave by the architect Gustave Bonnet.
- 1867: watercolor map of the park is presented at the Universal Exposition of Paris.
- From 1877 to 1880: reconstruction of large greenhouses.
- 1881: building of the monument des Légionnaires.
- 1887: building of the greenhouse Victoria, destroyed in 1980.
- 1894: Universal, international and colonial Exhibition took place on the site of the Parc de la Tête d'Or. After an act on 28 August 1884, forts of the Parc de la Tête d'Or and Charpennes were demolished for the creation of the Boulevard du Nord, currently named Boulevard des Belges. The guards cottage, cottages, and the velodrome were built. That year, the Villeurbanne part of the park was annexed by the city of Lyon: the park was for a long time shared between Lyon and Villeurbanne, and the border between the two communities crossed the park. Quarrels and rivalries always arose between the two municipalities regarding expenditures and revenues of the park. French president under the Third Republic Jean Casimir-Perier promulgated on 17 December 1894 the law on the annexation of the section of the park in Villeurbanne to the 6th arrondissement of Lyon.
- 1896 to 1898: The city wanted to make a fence to protect the park and to prevent fraudsters from introducing goods hidden by vegetation, as the park was located then at the limit of the grant. On 5 November 1896 was decided the construction of the fence consists of a concrete wall topped by an iron railing. A strong opposition was raised against the idea of a fence: on 17 November 1898, the gate was torn over three hundred metres. The work ended with the break of grids to three entries: Tête-d'Or door, Montgolfier door and the main door of Les Légionnaires, now called Les Enfants du Rhône. This latter door was the subject of a competition launched in 1898, won by Charles Meysson. The door was made by the Lyon firm Jean Bernard. It is thirty-two metres length and has two stone pylons. The central door is eleven metres high. The whole door weighs eleven tons.
- 1899: construction of collections, cultures and palms greenhouses
- 1901: construction of flags of the Tête d'Or door
- 1904: construction of the stable for cows by architect Tony Garnier which moved to Cibeins in 1914.
- 1913: construction of a pier on the lake
- 1917: inauguration of new cages for lions
- 1932: the underground connecting the Île aux Cygnes and the east bank were opened.
- 1961 to 1964: creation of the new rose garden
- 1964: creation of the enclosure for elephants
- 1968: construction of an enclosure for giraffes, now empty after the removal of the giraffes in their new enclosure in the African plain
- 1989: creation of the human right place (Espace droits de l'homme) in the northern part of the park; some monoliths erected contain the text of the statement.
- 1991: proposal to build a new entrance in front of the Cité Internationale de Lyon
- 2006–2007: establishment of the African plain in the zoo.

== Layout ==
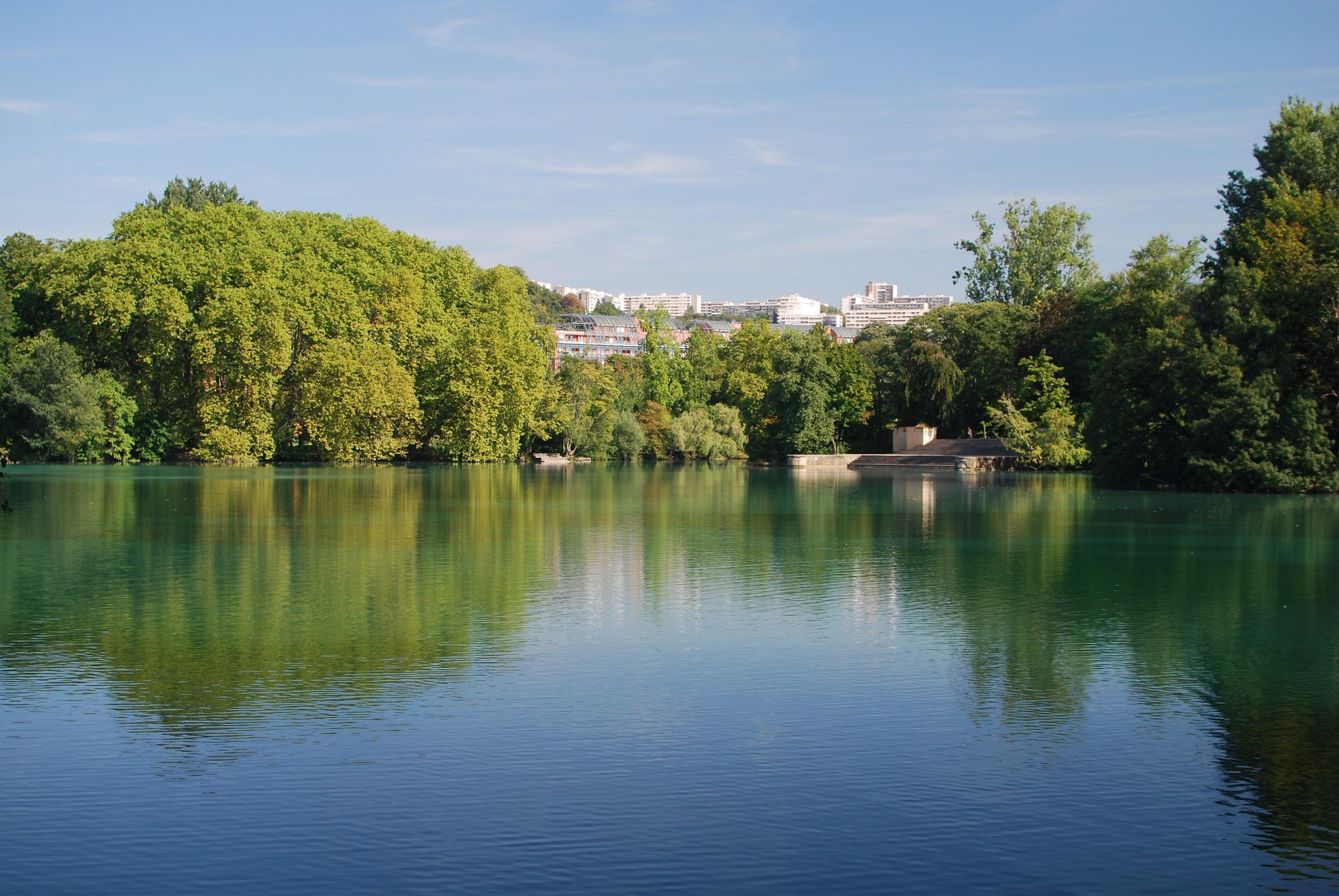
The lake at the centre of the park, looking towards the war memorial on the Île aux Cygnes

The park has large grassy areas and rolling terrain. It is bordered by a dike that separates the Rhone and on which the fair and exhibitions were held. After the moving of the Exhibition Centre to the suburbs, in Chassieu, the site became a housing complex with offices, apartments and buildings devoted to entertainment, including the International City of Lyon and the 3000-seat Amphitheatre of the Palais des Congrès of Lyon. A vast lake of 16 hectares can indulge in the pleasures of boating in summer, thanks to the pier located on the south bank. In the northern part of the lake rise two wooded islands, the Île des Tamaris, accessible only by boat, and the Île du Souvenir on which is erected a memorial in the shape of a quadrilateral. Formerly called Île des Cygnes, it has been converted after plans by the Lyon architect Tony Garnier and the 1904 Prix de Rome sculptor Jean-Baptiste Larrivé to honour soldiers killed in combat. The soldiers' names are engraved on the outer sides of walls. An underground corridor provides access to the island, the staircase that leads literally immersed under the lake.

== Features ==
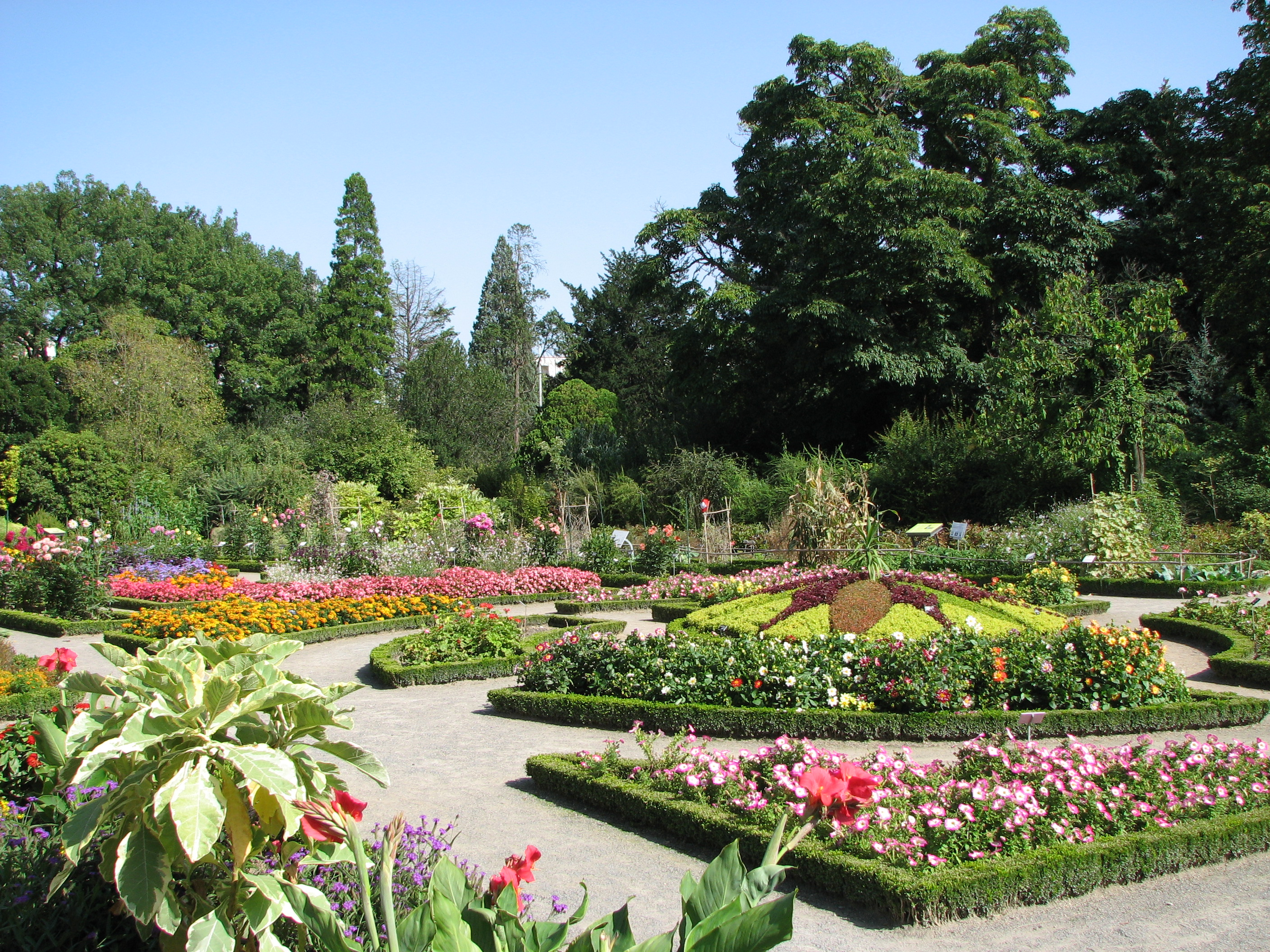
The floral garden, a part of the park's large botanical garden

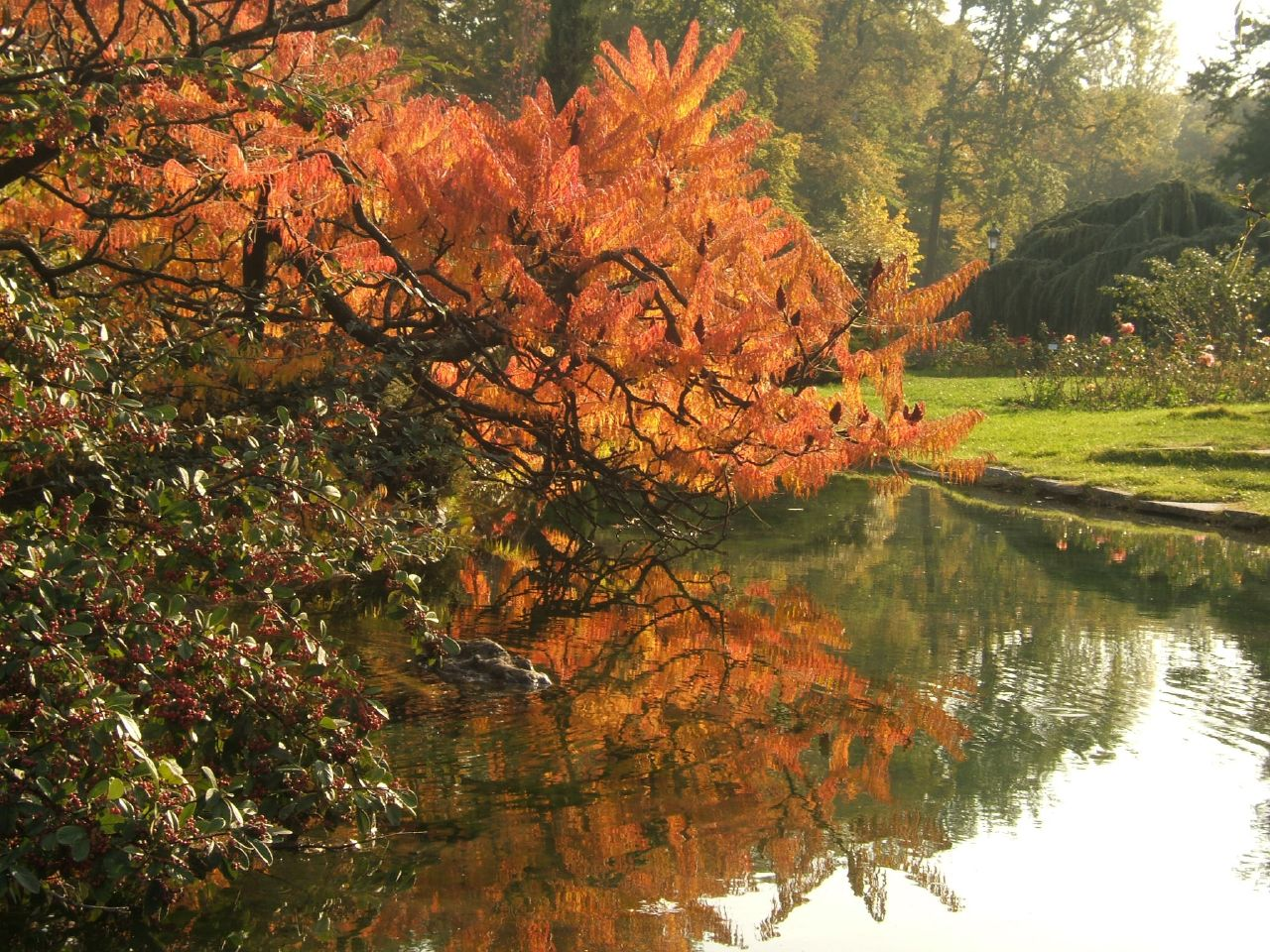
Sumac on a tiny island in the park

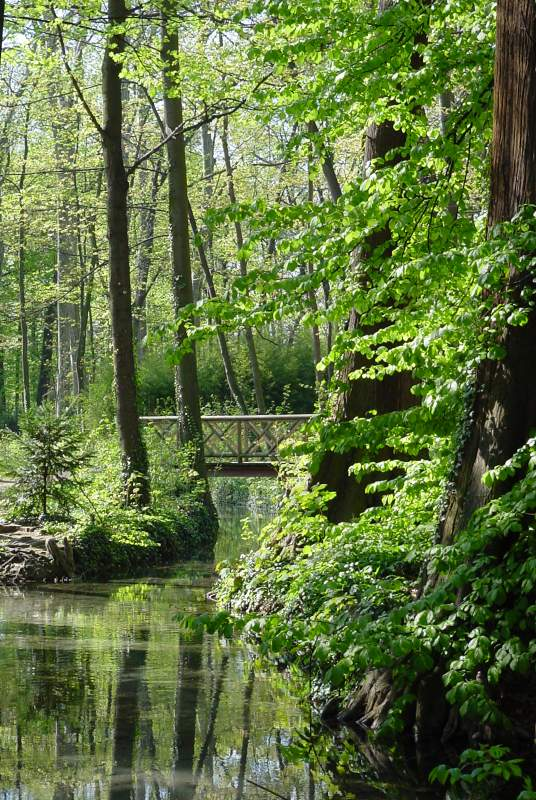
A small wooden bridge

The park also contains four rose gardens, but also huge greenhouses, a botanical garden, a zoo and a velodrome.

The main entrance, at the southeast corner, is guarded by an enormous wrought iron gate known as the Porte des enfants du Rhône (Gate of the children of the Rhône). The gate, with its gilded features, was installed in 1901, when the park was fenced off for the first time.

=== Zoo ===
Lyon Zoo was created at the same time as the park. At first, it was scheduled to create only of a farm for educational purposes, with some local wild animals, but little by little, developments have been increased to accommodate new animals and the park progressively has been turning into a real zoo.

The zoo now houses animals from around the world. It extends over six hectares and counts several hundred animals, including many large mammals, some are very rare, like the Barbary lion, extinct in the wild since 1922.

In October 2006, the park opened "La Plaine Africaine" ("The African plain"), an area where 130 different animals—some belonging to rare and protected species—live in freedom on 2.5 acres (10,000 m^{2}). The African plain is divided into five parts. The savannah part, where Ankole-Watusis, the Nile lechwes, guineafowls and black crowned cranes can be seen, is the largest. It communicates with the part reserved for giraffes. A wet land houses many breeds of birds, including pelicans and flamingos and lemurs on an island. An adjacent enclosure is reserved for crocodiles, which are allowed to go out only escape during hot weather. At the east end of the plain a pavilion houses the boses for antelopes and some sandy enclosures adorned with rocks and stumps, where live yellow mongooses, porcupines, sand cats and bat-eared foxes and turtles. Other areas in reconstruction in 2010 spring, host servals, leopards and lions.

== Points of interest ==
- Jardin botanique de Lyon
- Vacherie du Parc
- Centauress and Faun sculpture
- Statue commemorating the XXII G7 conference in 1996

== See also ==
- Berges du Rhône
- Parc de Gerland
- Parc de Parilly
- Parc Sergent Blandan
- Parks in Lyon
- War memorial on Île du Souvenir

== Bibliography ==
- Louis-Michel Nourry, Lyon, le parc de la Tête d'Or, AGEP, 1992, 127 pages (ISBN 290263463-3)
