= Parc Henry Chabert =

Urban park in Lyon, France

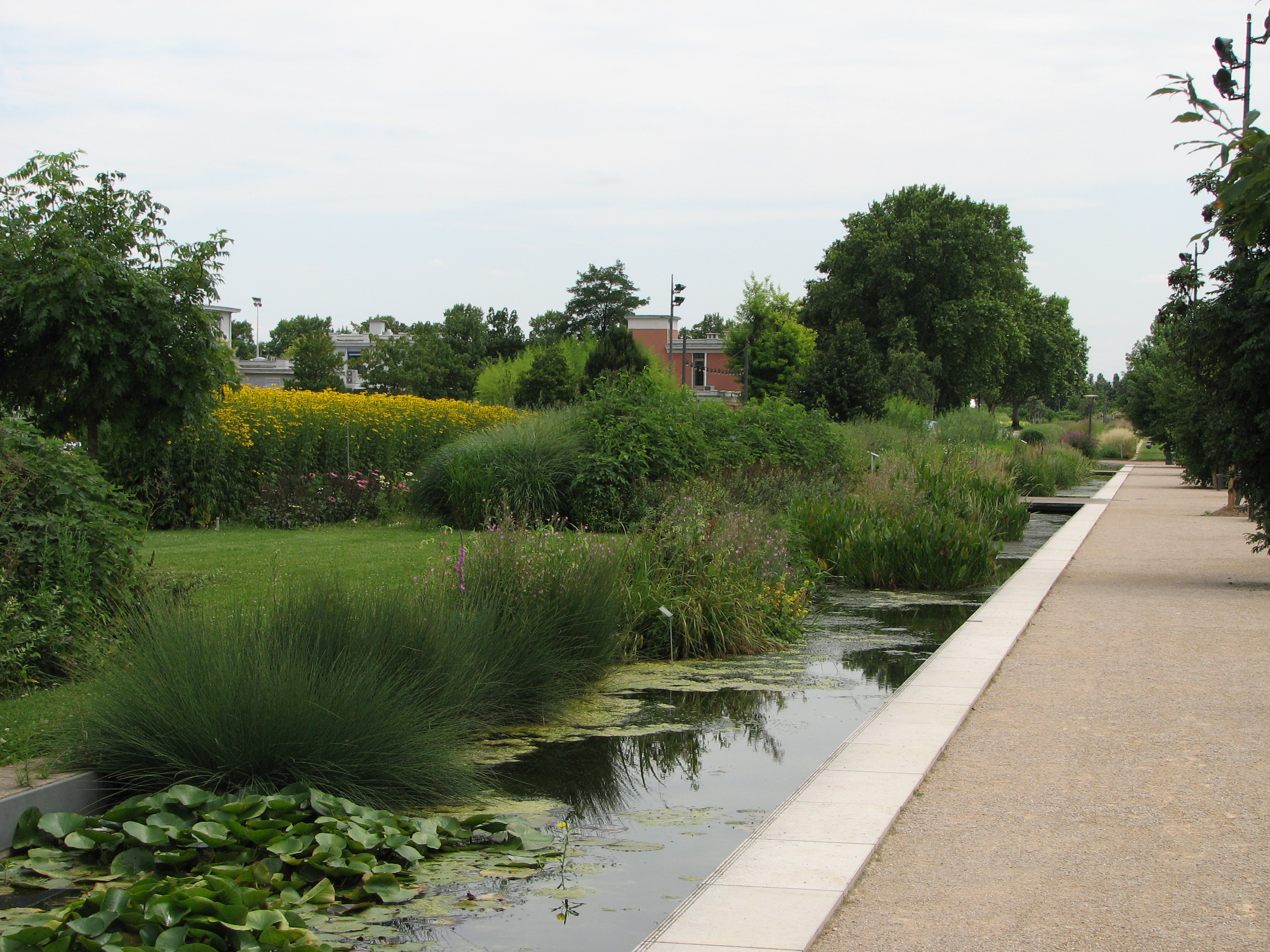
- Parc Henry Chabert
- Interactive map of Parc Henry Chabert
- Type: Urban park
- Location: Gerland, 7th arrondissement of Lyon, Lyon
- Coordinates: 45.723°N 4.824°E
- Area: 80 hectares (200 acres)
- Created: 2000
- Website: www.lyon.fr/lieu/patrimoine/parc-de-gerland.html

Parc Henry Chabert (French pronunciation: [paʁk ɑ̃ʁi ʃabɛʁ]), previously Parc de Gerland ([paʁk də ʒɛʁlɑ̃]) and also called Parc du Confluent ([paʁk dy kɔ̃flyɑ̃]), is a large greenspace in Lyon situated on a former industrial site in the south of the city near the confluence of the Rhône and the Saone. Construction began in 1996, and the park was developed over an area of 80 hectares (200 acres). The initial two phases of construction concluded in 2000 and 2006, and were carried out by landscape architect Michel Corajoud. The project was managed by Grand Lyon. The park was renamed to Parc Henry-Chabert on 19 December 2020.

The park includes several playgrounds, a skatepark and a botanical garden. It is situated next to the Stade de Gerland, and was used during the French archery championship finals in 2007 and 2012.

== See also ==
- Parc de la Tête d'or
- Parc de Parilly
- Parc Sergent Blandan
- Parks in Lyon
