= Caluire-et-Cuire =

- Commune
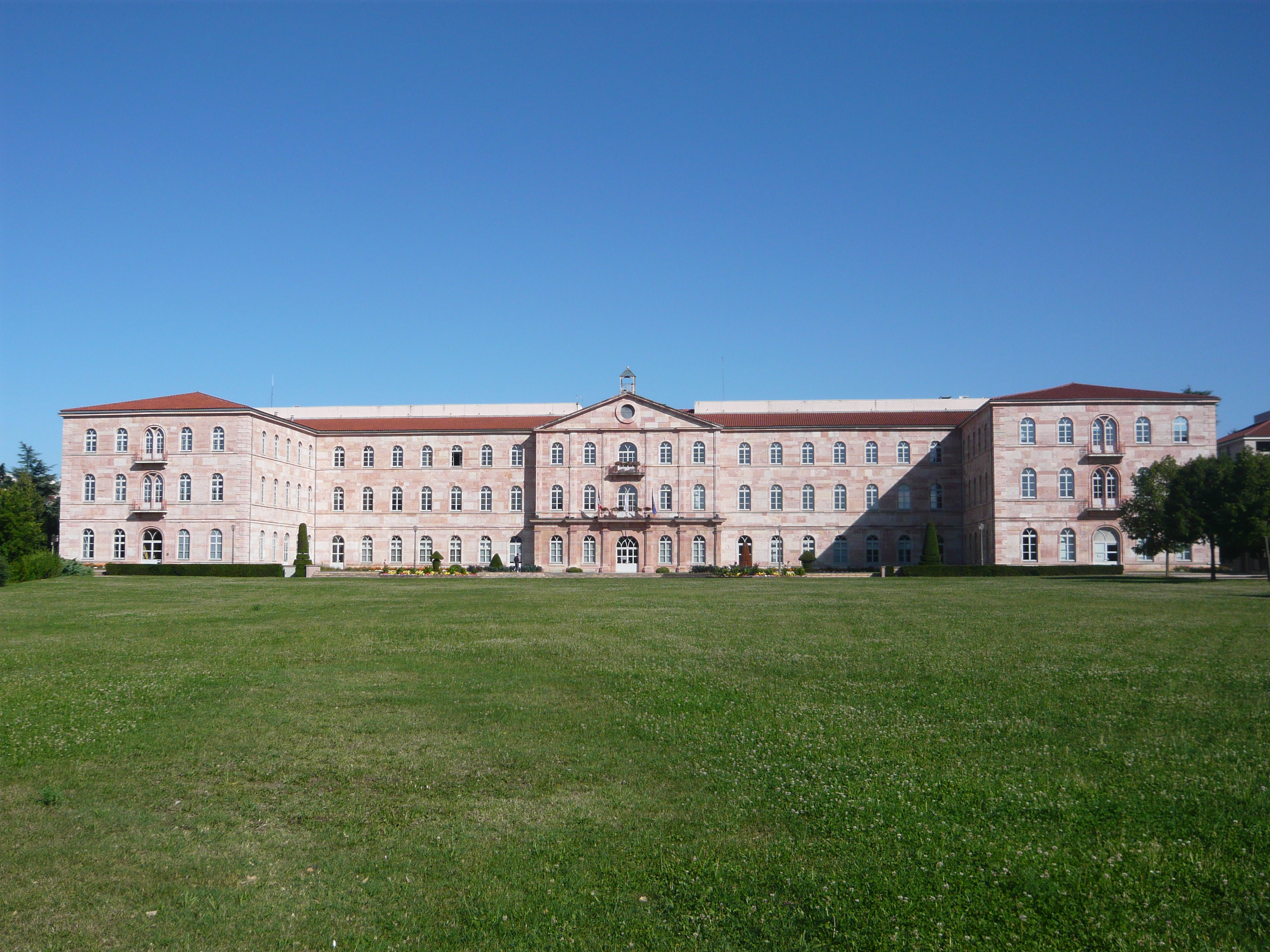
- The Hôtel de Ville

- Coat of arms
- Location of Caluire-et-Cuire
- Location within France Location within Auvergne-Rhône-Alpes
- Coordinates: 45°47′43″N 4°50′50″E
- Country: France
- Region: Auvergne-Rhône-Alpes
- Metropolis: Lyon Metropolis
- Arrondissement: Lyon

Government
  - Mayor (2025–2026): Bastien Joint (LR)
- Area^{1}: 10.45 km^{2} (4.03 sq mi)
- Highest elevation: 275 m (902 ft)
- Lowest elevation: 165 m (541 ft)
- Population (2023): 43,597
  - Density: 4,172/km^{2} (10,810/sq mi)
- Time zone: UTC+01:00 (CET)
  - Summer (DST): UTC+02:00 (CEST)
- INSEE/Postal code: 69034 /69300
- ^{1} French Land Register data, which excludes lakes, ponds, glaciers > 1 km^{2} (0.386 sq mi or 247 acres) and river estuaries.

Caluire-et-Cuire (French pronunciation: [kalɥiʁ e kɥiʁ], lit. 'Caluire and Cuire') is a commune in the Metropolis of Lyon in the Auvergne-Rhône-Alpes region, in central-eastern France.

It is the fifth-largest suburb of the city of Lyon, and lies 4 km north-by-east of Lyon.

== History ==
The Hôtel de Ville was built as the Institute of the Brothers of the Christian Schools (Frères des Écoles chrétiennes) in 1846.

== Population ==
Historical population

| Year | Pop. | ±% p.a. |
|---|---|---|
| 1793 | 2,500 | — |
| 1800 | 2,473 | −0.16% |
| 1806 | 2,719 | +1.59% |
| 1821 | 2,773 | +0.13% |
| 1831 | 4,000 | +3.73% |
| 1836 | 4,922 | +4.24% |
| 1841 | 4,705 | −0.90% |
| 1846 | 5,048 | +1.42% |
| 1851 | 6,148 | +4.02% |
| 1856 | 8,099 | +5.67% |
| 1861 | 8,774 | +1.61% |
| 1866 | 9,182 | +0.91% |
| 1872 | 8,440 | −1.39% |
| 1876 | 8,702 | +0.77% |
| 1881 | 9,740 | +2.28% |
| 1886 | 9,854 | +0.23% |
| 1891 | 9,988 | +0.27% |
| 1896 | 10,053 | +0.13% |
| 1901 | 10,926 | +1.68% |

| Year | Pop. | ±% p.a. |
|---|---|---|
| 1906 | 10,223 | −1.32% |
| 1911 | 10,877 | +1.25% |
| 1921 | 12,882 | +1.71% |
| 1926 | 13,523 | +0.98% |
| 1931 | 16,126 | +3.58% |
| 1936 | 15,760 | −0.46% |
| 1946 | 17,592 | +1.11% |
| 1954 | 19,886 | +1.54% |
| 1962 | 25,754 | +3.28% |
| 1968 | 37,603 | +6.51% |
| 1975 | 43,041 | +1.95% |
| 1982 | 41,931 | −0.37% |
| 1990 | 41,311 | −0.19% |
| 1999 | 41,233 | −0.02% |
| 2007 | 41,010 | −0.07% |
| 2012 | 42,038 | +0.50% |
| 2017 | 43,187 | +0.54% |
| 2023 | 43,597 | +0.16% |

Source: EHESS and INSEE (1968-2023)

== Neighbourhoods ==
- Le Bourg
- Vassieux
- Cuire-le-Bas (quarter)
- Cuire-le-Haut (quarter)
- Saint-Clair
- Le Vernay
- Montessuy
- Bissardon

== See also ==
- Parc Saint-Clair
