= Parc de Parilly =

Urban park in France

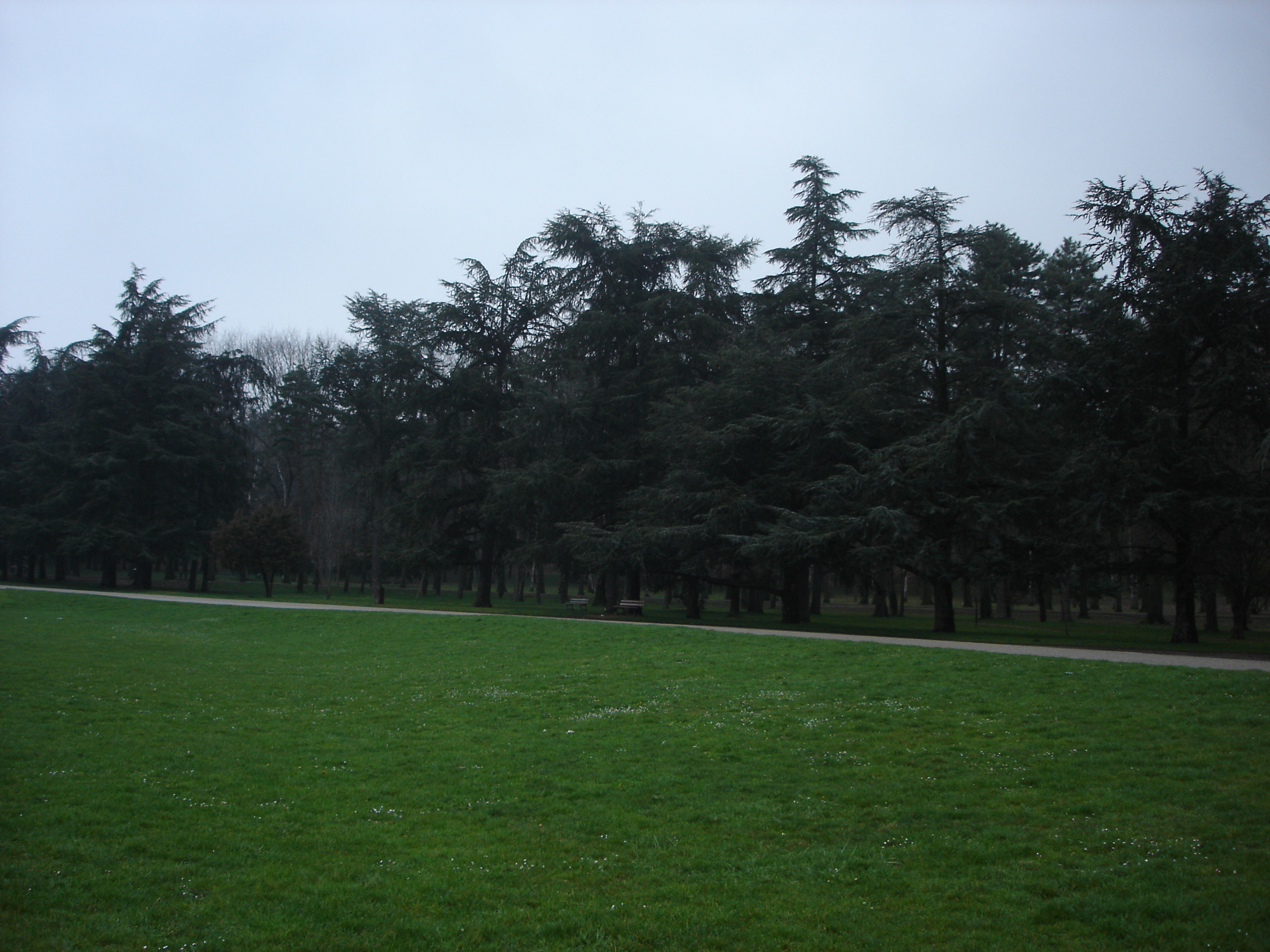
- Park forest and field
- Interactive map of Parc de Parilly
- Type: Urban park
- Location: Bron and Vénissieux, Lyon Metropolis
- Coordinates: 45.722°N 4.900°E
- Area: 178 hectares (440 acres)
- Created: 1937
- Public transit: Parilly; Parilly Université–Hippodrome
- Website: www.grandlyon.com/parc/parc-de-parilly

Parc de Parilly is an urban park in the communes of Bron and Vénissieux, Lyon Metropolis. Created in 1937, the park encompasses an area of 178 hectares (440 acres). The park includes numerous sport facilities, including a running track, a hippodrome, and basketball courts. It is accessible by Lyon Metro Line D at Parilly station, by line T2 of the tramway at Parilly Université–Hippodrome station, and by bus 39.

== History ==
In 1926, Lyon's mayor Édouard Herriot wanted to create a park in the east part of the city. The mayor of Bron at the time disapproved of the project because he thought that there was more important work that should be done, most notably the construction of housing for workers in the industrial district. However, in 1937 the city council approved the park and held a contest to select a designer. Pierre Bellemain was chosen to design the park, but the start of the Second World War temporarily put the project on hold.

The hippodrome de Parilly was inaugurated in 1965.

== Facilities ==
Previously managed by the department of Rhone, the park has been managed by Lyon Metropolis since 1 January 2015. The park is known for its hippodrome and its numerous sports fields, including 11 football fields, 7 basketball courts, 2 running tracks, 1 rugby pitch, 3 handball courts, 1 baseball diamond, and 1 cricket pitch.

== See also ==
- 2013 IPC Athletics World Championships
- Parks in Lyon
