= Marcy-l'Étoile =

- Commune
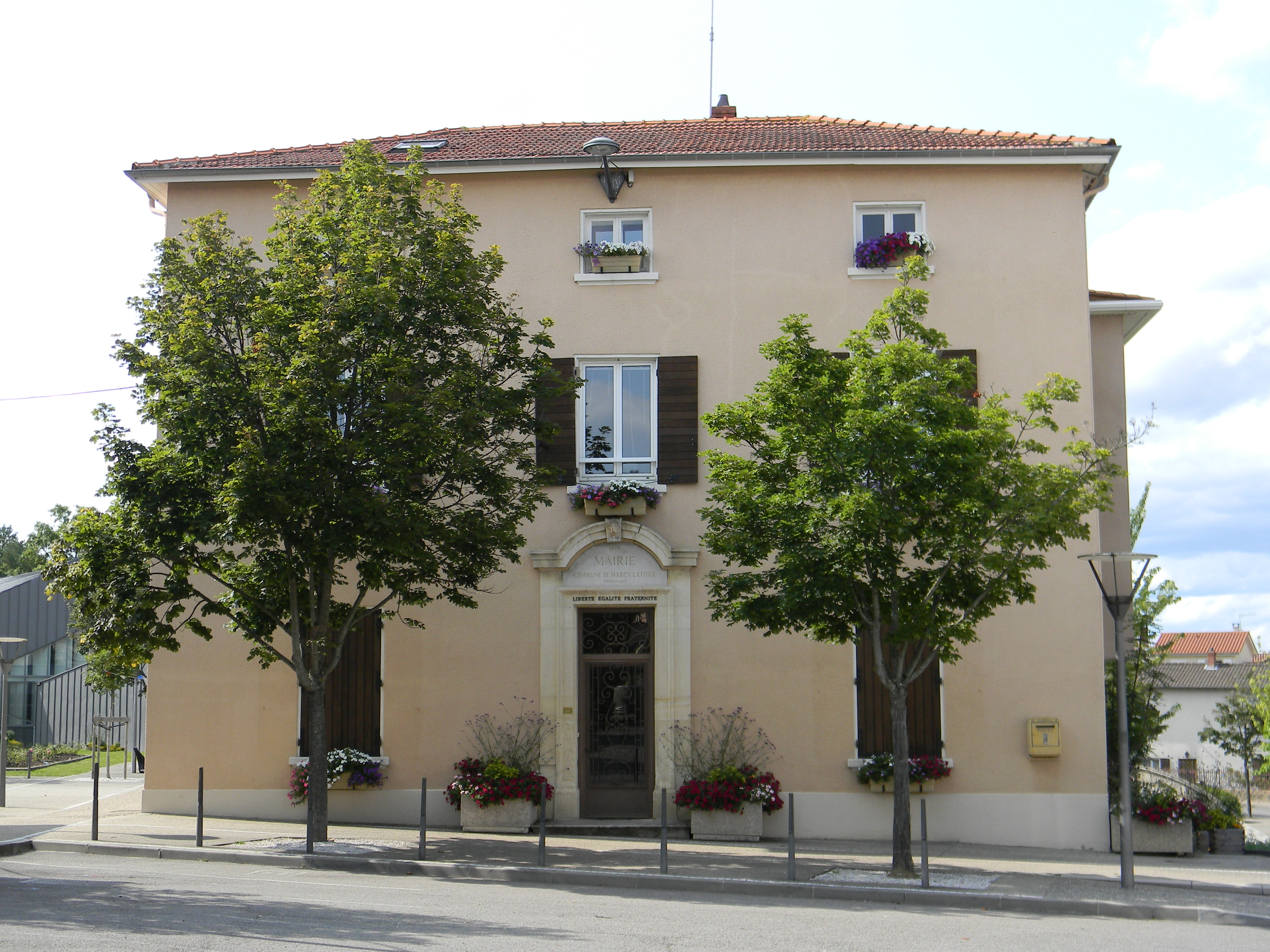
- The town hall in Marcy-l'Étoile

- Coat of arms
- Location of Marcy-l'Étoile
- Location within France Location within Auvergne-Rhône-Alpes
- Coordinates: 45°47′N 4°42′E
- Country: France
- Region: Auvergne-Rhône-Alpes
- Metropolis: Lyon Metropolis
- Arrondissement: Lyon

Government
  - Mayor (2020–2026): Loïc Commun
- Area^{1}: 5.37 km^{2} (2.07 sq mi)
- Elevation: 310 m (1,020 ft)
- Highest elevation: 369 m (1,211 ft)
- Lowest elevation: 233 m (764 ft)
- Population (2023): 3,778
  - Density: 704/km^{2} (1,820/sq mi)
- Time zone: UTC+01:00 (CET)
  - Summer (DST): UTC+02:00 (CEST)
- INSEE/Postal code: 69127 /69280
- ^{1} French Land Register data, which excludes lakes, ponds, glaciers > 1 km^{2} (0.386 sq mi or 247 acres) and river estuaries.

Marcy-l'Étoile (French pronunciation: [maʁsi letwal]) is a commune in the Metropolis of Lyon in Auvergne-Rhône-Alpes region in eastern France.

== Population ==
Historical population
Year	Pop.	±% p.a.
1968	484	—
1975	683	+5.04%
1982	1,033	+6.09%
1990	2,599	+12.22%
1999	3,091	+1.94%
2007	3,199	+0.43%
2012	3,503	+1.83%
2017	3,657	+0.86%
2023	3,778	+0.54%
Source: INSEE

== See also ==
- Communes of the Metropolis of Lyon
- Parc de Lacroix-Laval
