= Rue Tronchet =

Thoroughfare in Lyon, France

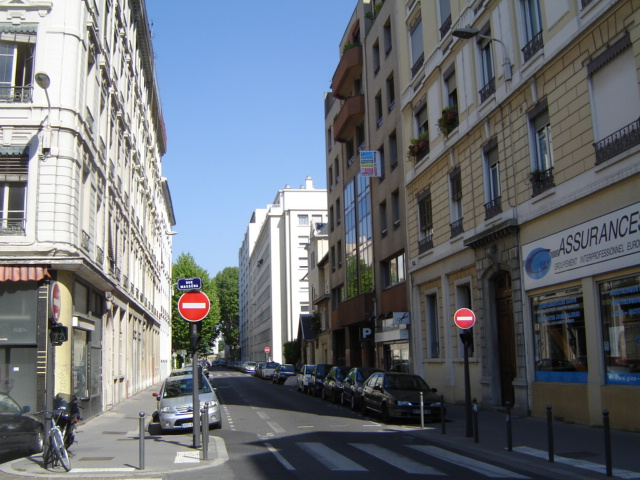
- The street, view from the Rue Masséna
- Type: Street
- Location: 6th arrondissement of Lyon, Lyon, France
- Postal code: 69006
- Coordinates: 45.770131°N 4.850666°E

The Rue Tronchet is a street located in the 6th arrondissement of Lyon, named after French jurist François Denis Tronchet (1726–1804).

== Location and history ==
The street starts on the Place du Maréchal Lyautey, in front of the Quai de Serbie and ends on the Boulevard Stalingrad which borders the Parc de la Tête d'Or, in Villeurbanne. It ends on the wall on the track, after having previously crossed many streets, including the Rue Malesharbes, Rue de Vendôme, Rue de Créqui, Rue Duguesclin, Rue Boileau, Rue Garibaldi, Rue Tête d'Or, Rue Massena, Rue Nay and Boulevard des Belges.

Originally, Jean-Antoine Morand wanted to name the street Allée des Soupirs (Alley of Sighs). The name of Tronchet was given from the French Restoration to the section of the street located between the banks of the Rhône and the current Rue Garibaldi. Beyond this part, it was called Rue Bergère before 1852.

From 1845, Alphonse Pugens directed the 19th-century gymnasium, located at No. 25; this establishment gained notoriety throughout years. In 1872, Professor of the Faculty of Sciences Lafon lived at No. 8. Charles Roux-Meulier draw plans for the 1890 building at No. 108. The No. 99 was donated to the Lyon hospitals. Lawyer Joannes Ambre, who gave his name to a place in Lyon, had his office in this street.

During the Second World War, the street was the place of a shooting by Germans in which several dozen French were killed.

== Architecture and monuments ==
The street starts with a perfectly straight alignment of 19th-century facades of three to five-floor houses. After the Rue Garibaldi, the two to five-floor buildings are simple, then the alignment progressively ends notably with a sculpted facade of a hotel, two old houses and a very recent porch. After the Rue Ney, there are a few bourgeois houses, the small garden Square du Capitaine Billon, and the stone facade of the Lycée du Parc in front of 20th-century buildings.

Among the famous monuments and buildings in this street, there are the Buchet et Colcombet silk factory, the convent of Franciscan nuns, the school Jean Rostand, the clinical Lyon Tête d'Or, the Lycée du Parc, the gymnasium and swimming pool of the Tronchet sports complex. There are also many shops and an Armenian Catholic parish.
