= Rue Garibaldi =

Street in Lyon, France

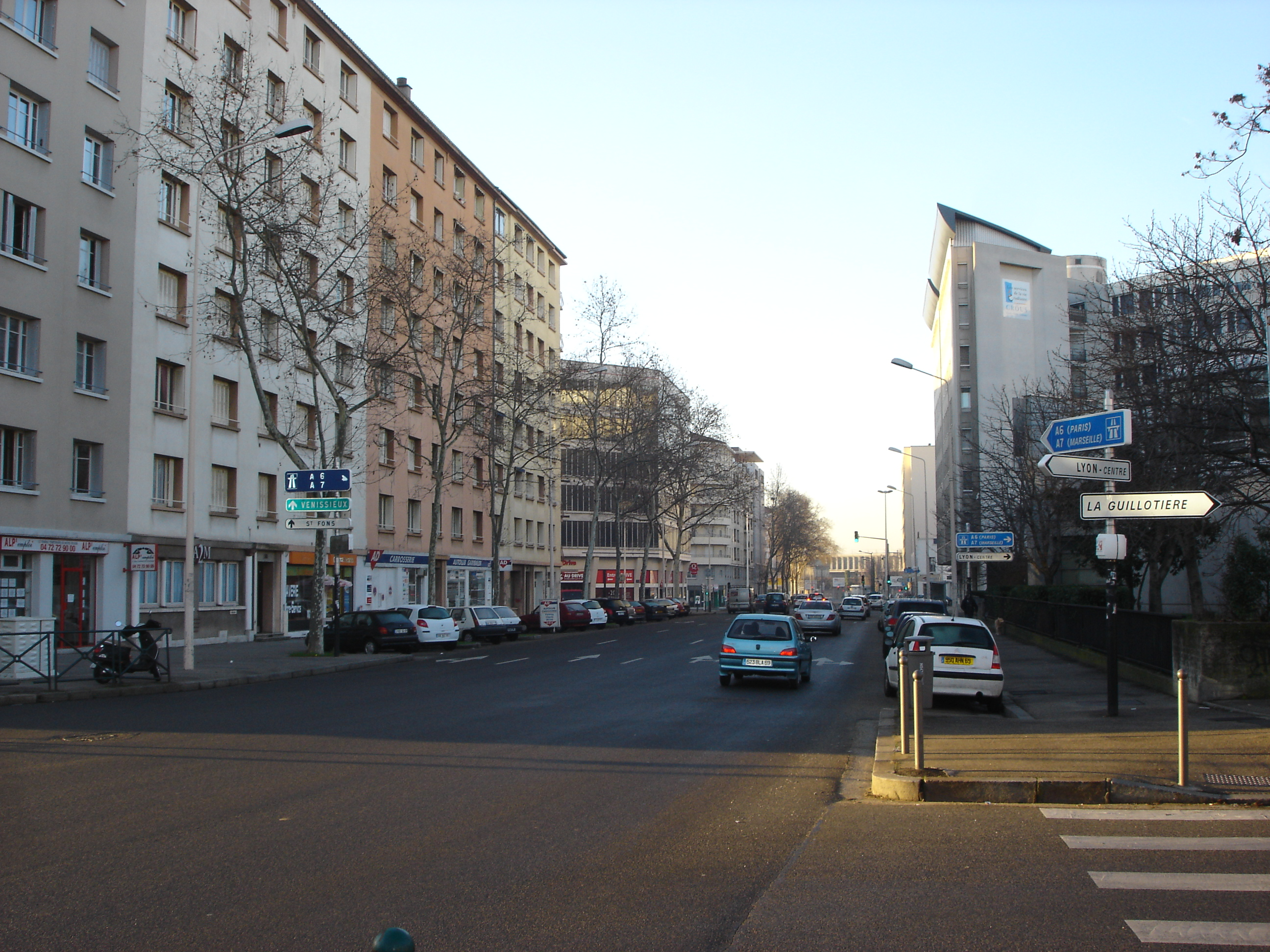
- The street in the 7th arrondissement
- Type: Street
- Length: over 3 km
- Location: 3rd, 6th and 7th arrondissements of Lyon, France
- Postal code: 69003, 69006, 69007
- Coordinates: 45.759784°N 4.852197°E

The Rue Garibaldi is a wide and long street in Lyon, located in the 3rd, 6th and 7th arrondissements, and named after Italian politician Giuseppe Garibaldi. There was also a square named Place Garibaldi in reference to his nephews, died during the World War I.

== History ==
The street was formerly called Rue Sainte-Élisabeth in reference to the sister of Louis XVI, Élisabeth of France. It was named Rue Garibaldi after the deliberation of the municipal council on 1 March 1871, then was renamed Rue Sainte-Élisabeth, and Rue Garibaldi on 6 July 1882. It was built gradually throughout the 19th century from the Cours Vitton. In 1913, the Rue Rave became part of the street. However, the extreme urbanization of the street causes a large number of nuisance to inhabitants of buildings, including noise, pollution, dangerous traffic. The street was the subject of several renovations from 1975.

Currently, the city of Lyon is rehabilitating the street. This project would include the reduction in the number of lanes, especially in the 3rd arrondissement and the creation of terraces and tree-lined sidewalks. In addition, with the construction of the Tour Incity in 2012 which will have its main entrance on the Rue Garibaldi, it will again undergo rehabilitation. This project will cost about 5 million euro.

There was in the street a Masonic temple built by architect Peter Martin. Many political meetings took place at the restaurant Guillerme at No. 108. Television host Simone Garnier lived in the street.

== Location and architecture ==
The street is mostly surrounded by trees and high buildings with around 20 floors, built from 1950. It begins after the Boulevard des Belges in the north of the 6th arrondissement, and ends on the Avenue Berthelot in the 7th arrondissement in the south. This is one of the longest streets in the city, as well as the Rue de Créqui, the Rue Duguesclin or the Avenue Jean Jaurès with 3,850 meters. It looks like a highway, sometimes composed of 5 lines. In most of the 3rd arrondissement, the street is almost impassable by pedestrians, who must then borrow an underpass to cross.

Near the Rue Duquesne, there are mainly large buildings with golden and rounding doors. Around the Cours Vitton, the street is more narrow with five-floor older stone buildings, and old houses (west) including the city hall of the 6th arrondissement, and more recent and high buildings (east). After the Cours Lafayette, a twenty-floor tour with golden windows can be seen, then tax offices, a bank and the Grand Lyon appear as three glass buildings in a cubic form. The street ends with old workshops, new homes and vacant lots.

There are a pool, the Lycée Saint-Joseph, many regional and departmental managements, various associations, the Centre régional des œuvres universitaires et scolaires, many doctors' offices, restaurants, and many food, clothing, and furniture stores.
