= 8th arrondissement of Lyon =

- Municipal arrondissement
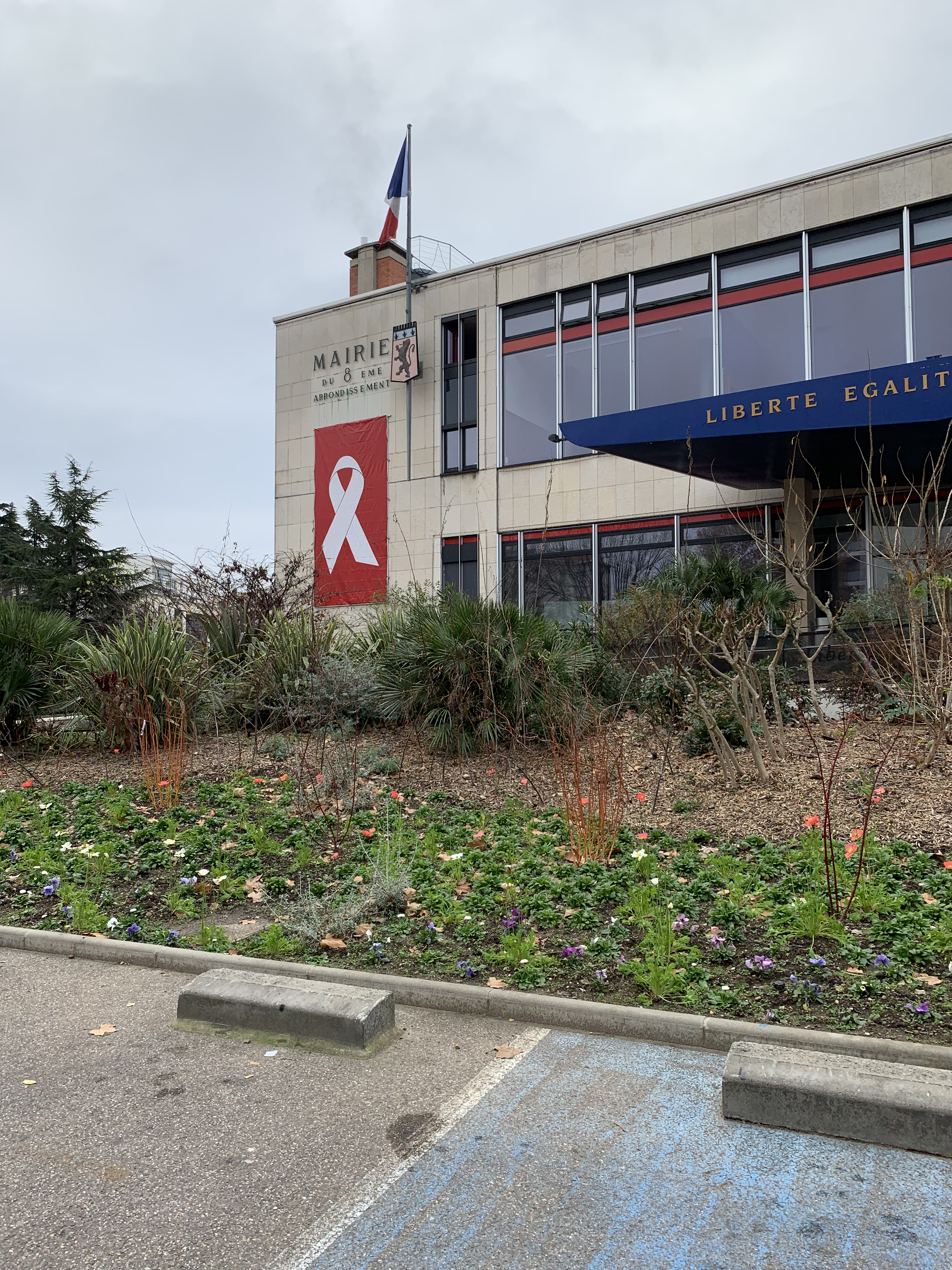
- Mairie of the 8th arrondissement

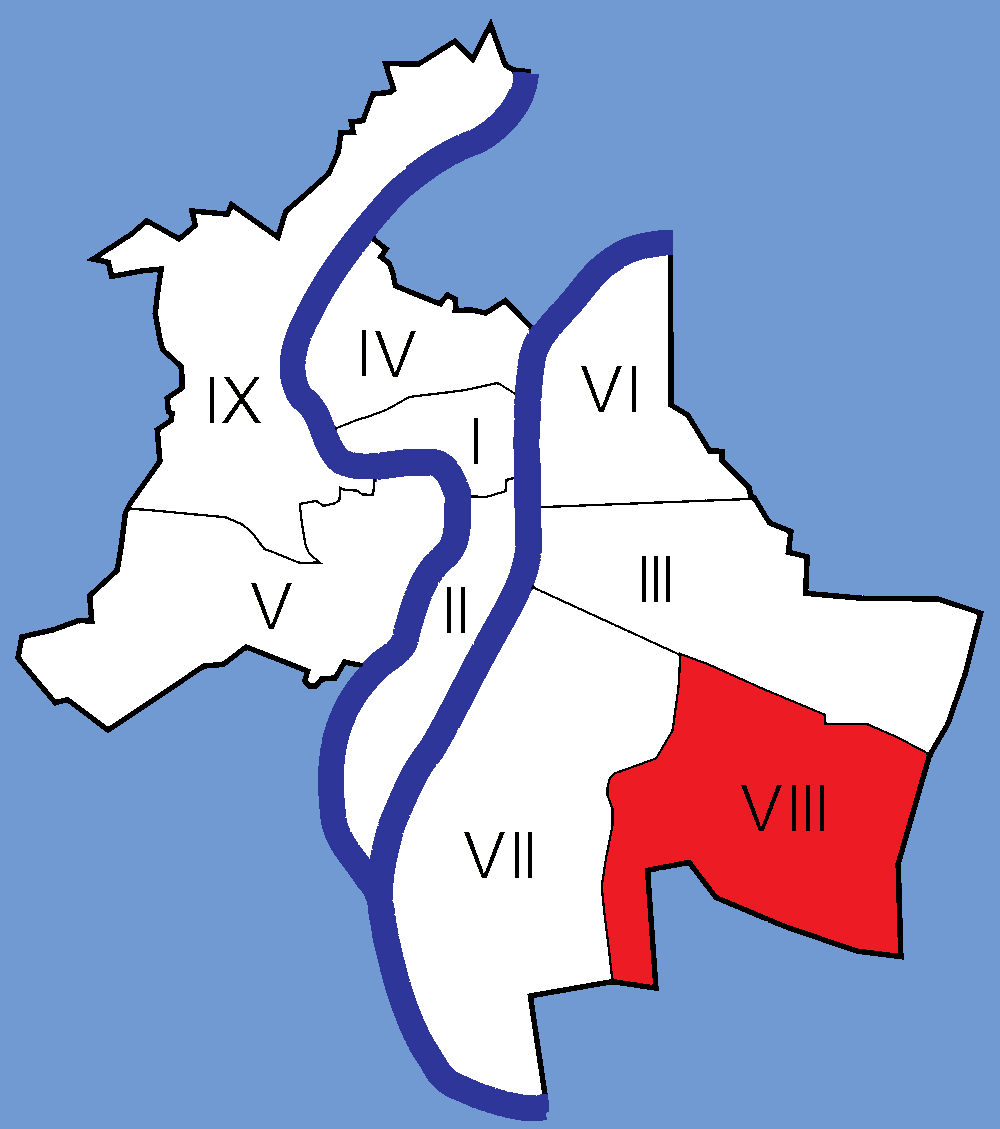
- Location within Lyon
- Coordinates: 45°44′5″N 4°52′5″E
- Country: France
- Region: Auvergne-Rhône-Alpes
- Department: Lyon Metropolis
- Commune: Lyon

Government
  - Mayor (2020–2026): Olivier Berzane (EELV)
- Area: 6.67 km^{2} (2.58 sq mi)
- Population (2023): 85,943
  - Density: 12,900/km^{2} (33,400/sq mi)
- INSEE code: 69388

The 8th arrondissement of Lyon (French: 8^{e} arrondissement de Lyon) is one of the 9 arrondissements of Lyon. It is located between the 3rd and 7th arrondissements of Lyon and the cities of Bron and Venissieux.

In 2023, this arrondissement had a population of 85,943 inhabitants.

== History ==
When municipalities and cities were established during the French Revolution, the current area of the 8th arrondissement, at the time fairly rural, was attached to the then-town of La Guillotière.

In 1852, a decree attached the towns of Vaise, La Croix-Rousse and La Guillotière to the city of Lyon. A new administrative division of the city was then necessary. Originally, only 5 arrondissements were created, and today's 8th arrondissement was then part of the 3rd arrondissement of Lyon.

In the second half of the 19th century and the first half of the 20th century, the arrondissement grew considerably, developing around former villages undergoing industrialization. In the 1930s, the États-Unis neighborhood was built under the direction of architect and urban planner Tony Garnier in the southern part of the arrondissement. A university hospital complex was built in the Grange Blanche area.

In 1912, the arrondissements were redrawn again and the area of the current 8th arrondissement was integrated into the new 7th arrondissement. In February 1959, today's 8th arrondissement was created, when the Prime Minister approved by decree an increase in the number of arrondissements to eight.

On May 4, 1959, the Municipal Council approved the project to install a temporary town hall on the Place du Bachut. In March 1963, the Municipal Council adopted a project for the construction of a permanent town hall with a budget of 11,441,000 francs, designed by Pierre Bourdeix. It officially opened on October 20, 1966.

== Geography ==
The nine arrondissements of Lyon

Arrondissements of Lyon

=== Neighborhoods ===
- Le Bachut
- Monplaisir Ville
- Monplaisir La Plaine, usually known as La Plaine
- Mermoz Nord
- Mermoz Sud
- Les États-Unis
- Le Transvaal
- Laënnec
- Le Grand Trou

=== Streets ===
- Avenue Berthelot
- Boulevard des États-Unis
- Avenue Jean Mermoz
- Place Ambroise-Courtois
- Place du 7 novembre
- Place Général André
- Avenue Paul Santy

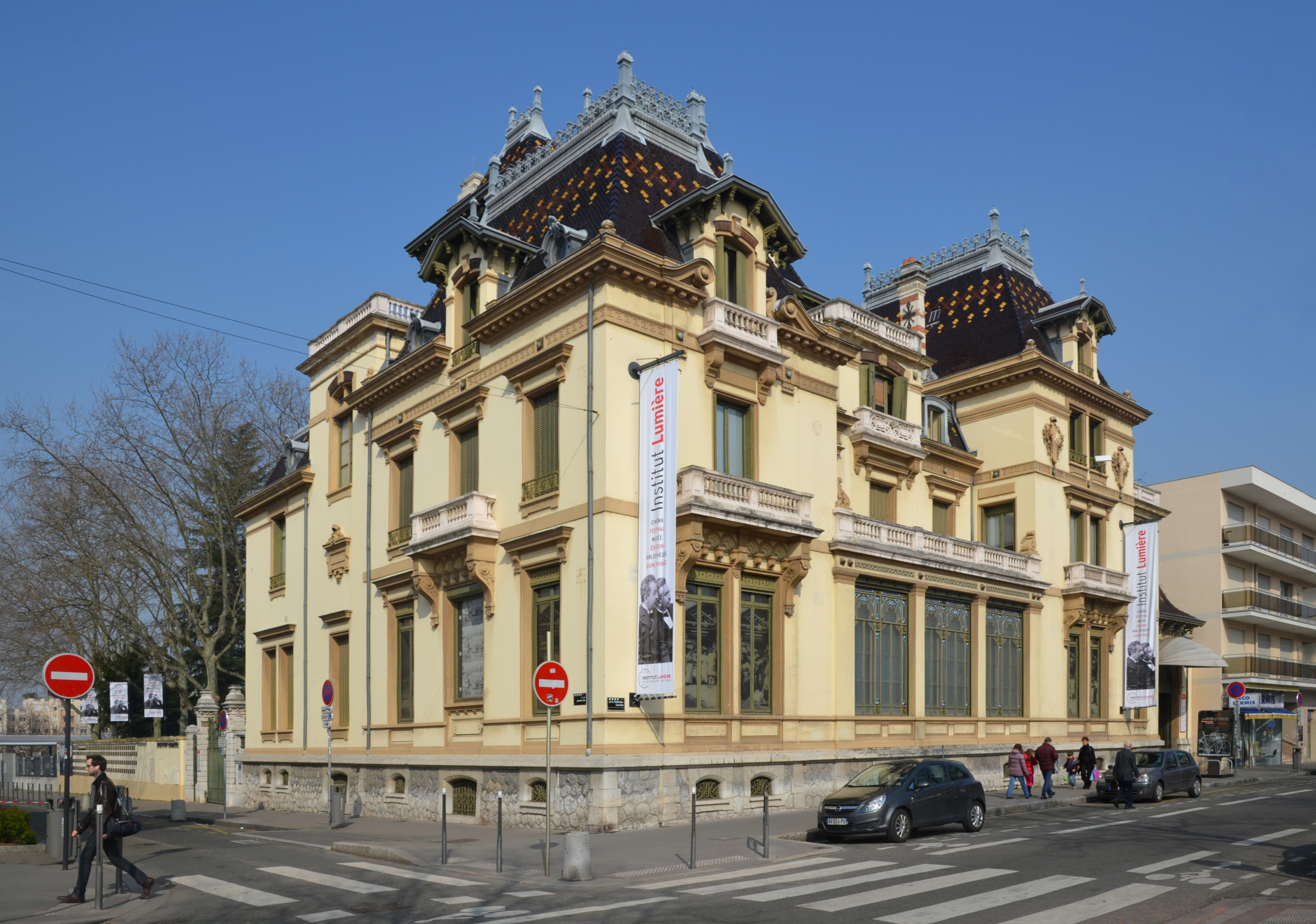
The Villa Lumière which hosts the Musée Lumière

=== Monuments ===
- Musée urbain Tony-Garnier
- Maison de la danse
- Médiathèque du Bachut
- Institut Lumière

== Demography ==
Historical population
Year	Pop.	±% p.a.
1968	77,100	—
1975	71,222	−1.13%
1982	65,773	−1.13%
1990	64,763	−0.19%
1999	70,317	+0.92%
2007	76,303	+1.03%
2012	81,454	+1.32%
2017	85,088	+0.88%
2023	85,943	+0.17%
Source: INSEE

== Transports ==
The 8th arrondissement is the beginning of the A43 motorway (to Grenoble and Chambéry).

This arrondissement is served by metro line and tram lines,, and.

== Administration ==
Mayors

- 1983-1989 : Robert Batailly
- 1989-1995 : Henri Vianay
- 1995-2001 : Jean-Louis Touraine (PS)
- 2001-2020 : Christian Coulon (PS)
- 2020-today : Olivier Berzane (EELV)
