= Avenue Berthelot =

Street in Lyon, France

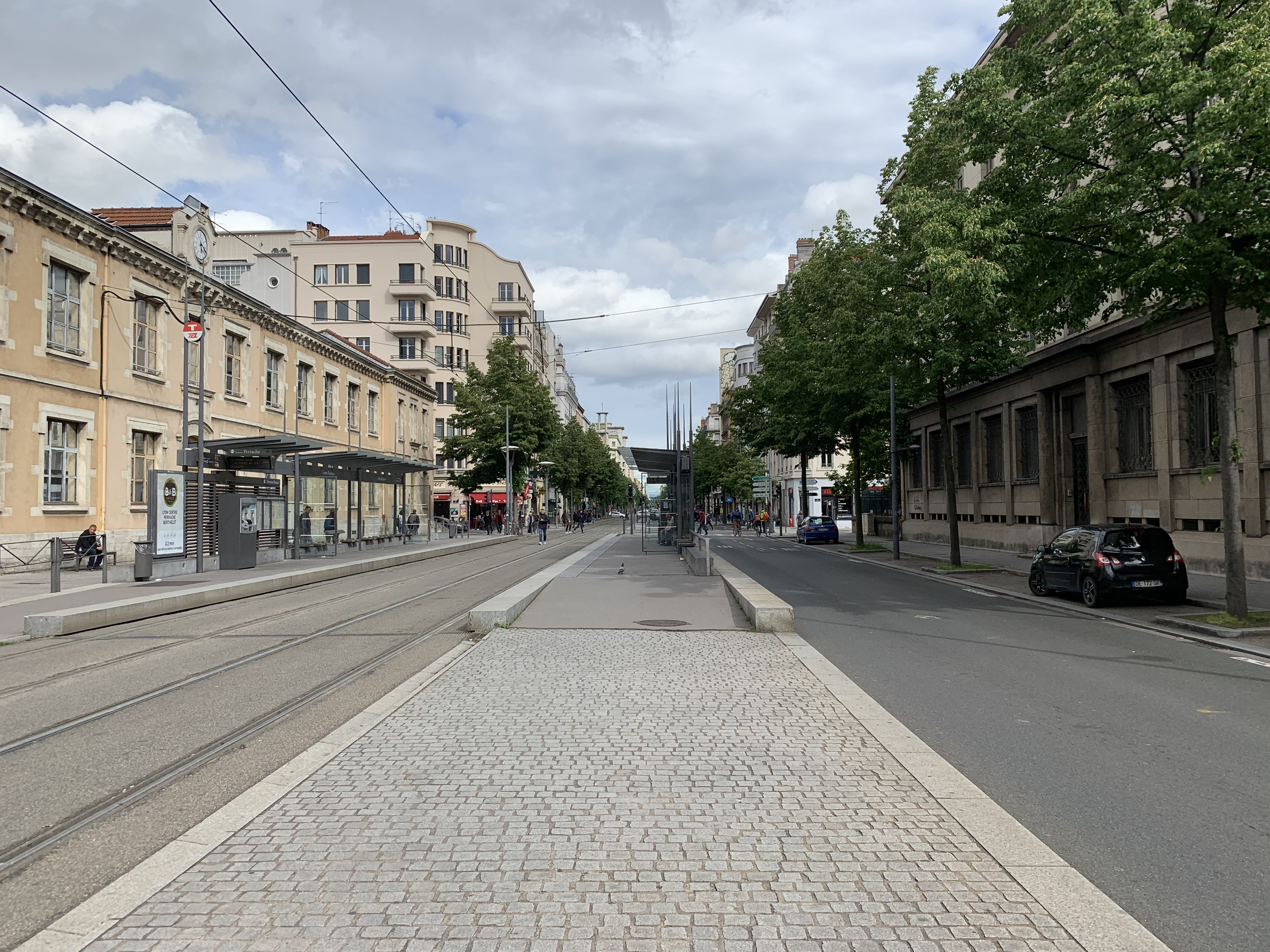
- Avenue Berthelot in May 2019
- Interactive map of Avenue Berthelot
- Former name: Avenue des Ponts ( —1907)
- Location: 7th and 8th arrondissement of Lyon, Lyon, France
- Postal code: 69007, 69008
- Coordinates: 45°44′33″N 4°51′2″E

Construction
- Construction start: 19th century

The Avenue Berthelot (English: /bɛərtəˈloʊ/, French: [bɛʁtəlo]) is a street in the 7th and 8th arrondissements of Lyon. In an east-west axis, it connects the Gallieni Bridge to the Place du 11-Novembre 1918, it is then extended by the Avenue Jean Mermoz until the A43 autoroute. The avenue goes through La Guillotière and Le Bachut quarters.

== History ==
Formerly named Avenue des Ponts as it was drawn as an extension of the two Ponts Napoléon (currently named Pont Gallieni and Pont Kitchner), the street acquired its current name on 25 March 1907, after the chemist Marcellin Berthelot who had died on 18 March 1907. In 1923, there were 351 numbers in the avenue. A part of the Avenue Berthelot was renamed Rue Paul Painlevé on 11 March 1935. In 1939, another part was renamed Avenue Jean Mermoz and Rue Paul Painlevé was incorporated into this new avenue. At number 59, there was the Châlet Russe which was destroyed by bombing on 26 May 1944. The present church in this avenue was inaugurated on 4 November 1961.

== Description ==
The avenue runs along the old École de santé des Armées, now named Centre Berthelot. It is located at number 18 and was built under the direction of Abraham Hirsch.

Major axis of east-west traffic of the south of the city, its automobile attendance declined sharply since the construction of the tram line T2. Motorists have now just two lanes (one-way east-west) along its entire length, the tram enjoying the other half of the roadway.

The avenue is entirely served by tram line T2 with 7 stations, but it is also crossed by métro line B at the Place Jean-Macé and by tram line T4 at the Place Pierre Mendès-France.

This avenue connects highways A7 to A43. Notable monuments of this avenue are Centre Berthelot (hosting Center for the History of the Resistance and Deportation and Sciences Po Lyon), the Guillotière Cemetery, Le Comœdia cinema and the Jean Macé railway station.
