= Place Jean-Macé, Lyon =

Square in Lyon, France

Place Jean-Macé
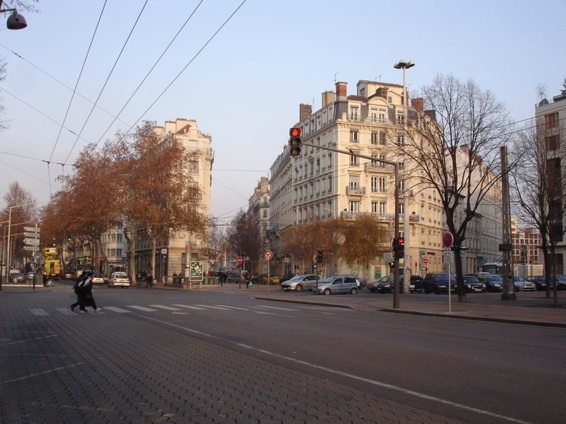
- Place Jean-Macé
- Interactive map of Place Jean-Macé
- Type: Street
- Location: 7th arrondissement of Lyon
- Postal code: 69007
- Nearest metro station: Jean Macé
- Coordinates: 45.74554°N 4.84234°E

The Place Jean-Macé is a plaza located in the 7th arrondissement of Lyon in France.

== History ==
In 1892, the Avenue Maréchal de Saxe was extended towards the south (the current Avenue Jean Jaurès). North of the railway, it crossed paths with Gerland (currently the Rue Renan) and the Rue Avignon (now the Rue Elie Rochette), forming an enclosed square. Built in the first part of the 19th century, the Fort du Colombier and the wall that connected the height of the Vitriolerie were destroyed in the 1890s. A new public square was then built on the vacant land.

== Points of interest ==
- Town Hall of 7th arrondissement, whose construction was completed in 1920 by architect Charles Meysson, and houses the works of the painter Pierre Descombes Combet.
- Jean Macé Library, part of Lyon Municipal Library
- Lyon-Jean Macé railway station, served by TER Auvergne-Rhône-Alpes regional railway services.
- Two Vélo'v bicycle pickup stations on the square

Near

- The Berthelot Center, which houses:
  - Center for History of Resistance and Deportation
  - Institute for Political Science of Lyon
- Berges du Rhône
- Comœdia Cinema
- Lumière University Lyon 2
- Saint-Luc Saint-Joseph Hospital
- Sergent Blandan Park

== Public transport ==
The Place Jean-Macé is served by several lines of TCL urban transit network at the station Jean Macé:

- Métro Line B (opened in 1981)
- Tram Line T2 (opened in 2001)
- Bus and trolleybuses lines C5, C7, C12, C14, 35 and 64.

The Lyon-Jean Macé railway station opened in 2009 on the south side of the square and is served by TER Auvergne-Rhône-Alpes regional railway services.

== Events on the square ==
- Market in the square, on Wednesday and Saturday morning
- The market for booksellers, once per month
