= Les Brotteaux =

Neighbourhood in Lyon, France

Coordinates: 45°46′10″N 4°51′01″E

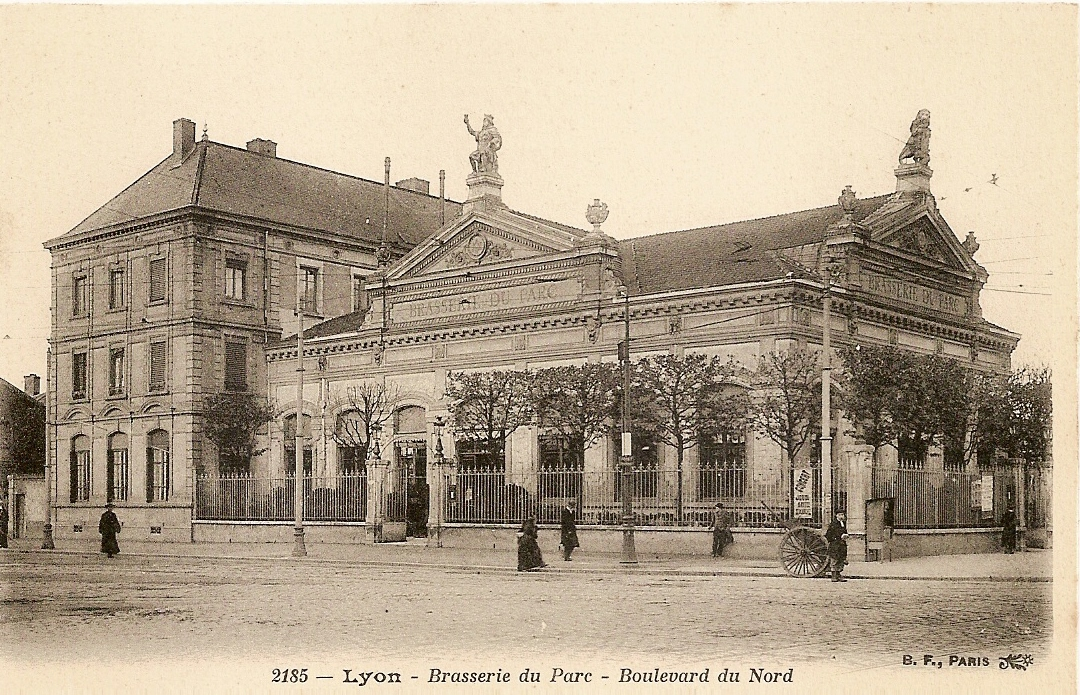
The former Brasserie du Parc

Brotteaux is a neighborhood in the 6th arrondissement of Lyon. It is situated between the Rhône and the track railway which leads to the Gare de la Part-Dieu. The urbanization of this area began in the late eighteenth century under the leadership of architect and urban planner Jean-Antoine Morand Jouffrey (1727-1794). The area is sometimes called Morand quarter.

== Etymology ==
The word "Broteaux" (with one "t") means in Lyon-language an island in the Rhône alluvial plain and bounded by the river itself or one of its arms or lône. This word comes from Franco-Provençal language broteu, itself formed by brot, pronounced [bru], which means the young shoots of trees that grow here.

It seems that the current spelling with two "t", "brotteaux" has appeared in the early nineteenth century under the leadership of local government and against the protests of local scholars.

== Current description ==
Brotteaux quarter hosts a large number of renowned restaurants such as the Splendid of Georges Blanc, a restaurant which is in front of the Est of Paul Bocuse. La Brasserie des Brotteaux is also an ideal place for those who like the Lyon's culinary traditions.

Among the most notable structures of the quarter, there are the Gare des Brotteaux, out of service since 1983, the Palais de Flore, a 1930 Art Deco building houses located in the rue Waldeck-Rousseau, the Boulevard des Belges and mansions, the Parking Morand, a place dedicated to the work of architect Jean-Antoine Morand Jouffrey, creator of the Brotteaux district.
