= Maison de la danse =

- Théâtre du 8è

General information
- Type: Theater
- Location: 8th arrondissement of Lyon, Lyon, France, 8, Avenue Jean Mermoz
- Coordinates: 45.735193°N 4.871841°E
- Construction started: 1968
- Inaugurated: 1992

Design and construction
- Architect: Pierre Bourdeix

Website
- www.maisondeladanse.com/

The Maison de la danse ("House of Dance") is a theater located in the 8th arrondissement of Lyon, France. It was founded in 1980 in the Théâtre de la Croix-Rousse before moving in 1992 in what was called the Théâtre du 8ème ("Theatre of the 8th [arrondissement]"). This very important place for dance in the Rhône-Alpes region makes programming of international companies and of young companies of Rhône-Alpes. The building also hosts resident company in a creative studio and has a basic reference document on dance with a library composed of over 1,000 shows filmed.

== History ==
In 1977, five choreographers of Lyon became partners and created the idea of a place exclusively dedicated to dance. The project succeeded on 17 June 1980 with the inauguration of the first building devoted to dance in France and Europe, in the premises of a former ballroom of La Croix-Rousse which later became the Théâtre de la Croix-Rousse. This place was provided by the City of Lyon and its Deputy Minister of Culture Joannes Ambre. The direction was given to Guy Darmet. The success was important and unexpected. In September 1992, the Maison de la danse moved into the 8th arrondissement.

The building, located in Le Bachut quarter, was created in 1968 by Pierre Bourdeix, pupil of Tony Garnier. Originally, the building was intended as a banqueting hall.

In 20 years, the Maison de la Danse has welcomed more than 500 French and foreign companies, more than 100 works of young French choreographers, 59,000 subscribers and over 1,500,000 spectators.

Restored from May to October 1999, the room has 1,100 seats and also a studio with a capacity of 96 seats, named studio Jorge Donn, inaugurated in 2005.

== See also ==
- List of theatres and entertainment venues in Lyon
