= Jewish cemetery, Lyon =

Cemetery located in Rhône, in France

- Cimetière juif de Lyon
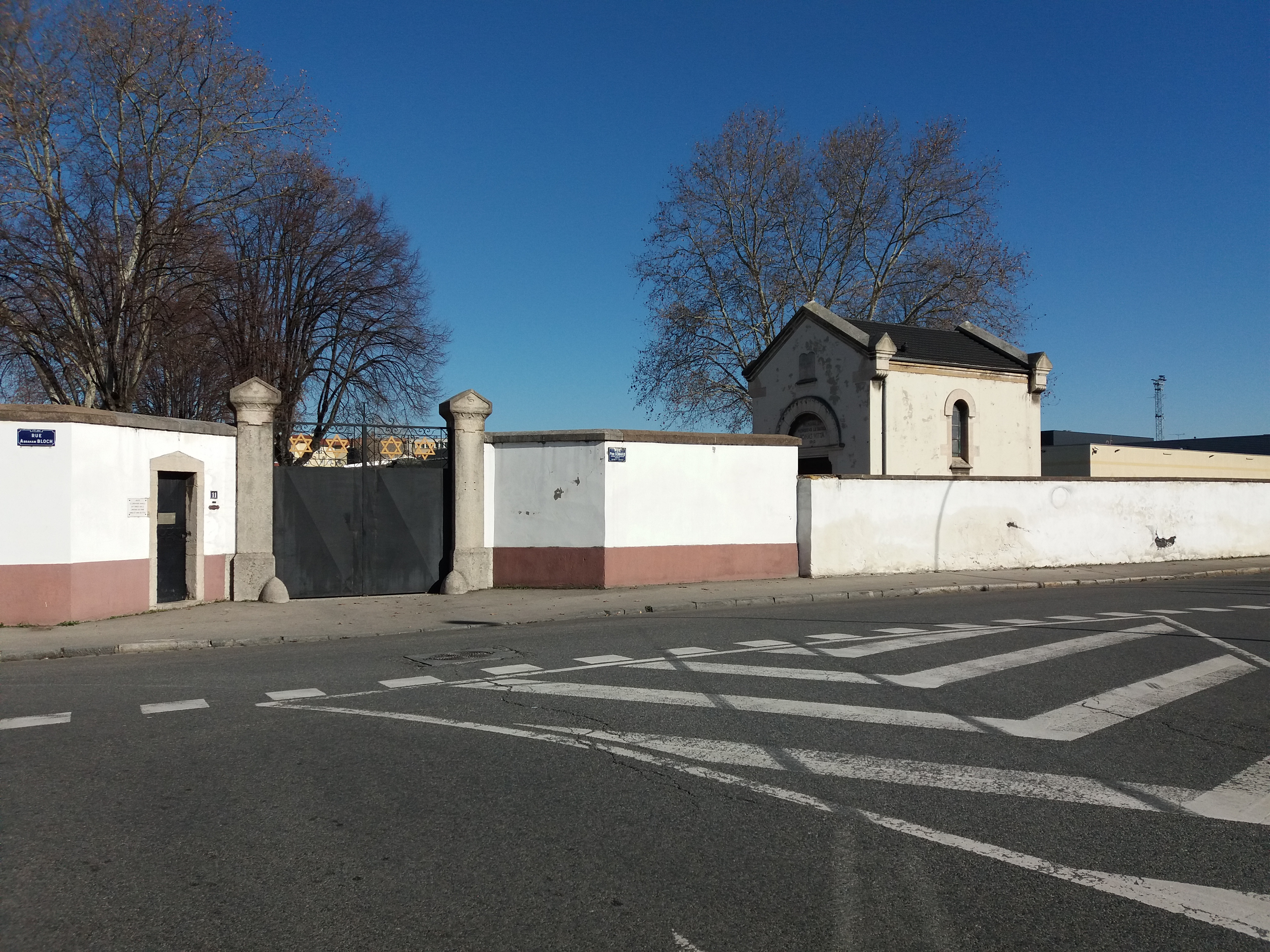

Details
- Established: 1795
- Location: Lyon
- Country: France
- Coordinates: 45.7396°N 4.8426°E
- Owned by: Israelite Central Consistory of Lyon
- Size: 7000 m^{2}
- No. of graves: 4900

The Jewish cemetery of Lyon, also called the Israelite Cemetery of Gerland or de la Mouche, is a Jewish cemetery located in Gerland, in the 7th arrondissement of Lyon, France. It is the only Jewish burial site in the city.

== History ==
While 32 Jewish tombs were found in a crypt underneath the Hôtel-Dieu de Lyon, the real cemetery was founded by a decision from the revolutionary government in 1795.

In 1992, the cemetery was vandalized for the first time. In 2004, 60 tombs of the cemetery were vandalized with Hitler's name, celtic cross and swastikas. The perpetrator was believed to be a mentally ill man who supported far-right politics. Jewish authorities and the French government expressed their dismay at the incident. Notably, local authorities were given "instructions to find the culprits of this odious act". Additionally, Interior Minister Dominique de Villepin, declared that the "determination of public authorities to combat against all antisemitic acts will not be wavered". The Cardinal of Lyon, Philippe Barbarin, equally expressed his "total solidarity and [his] full support to the Jewish community affected by this ignoble antisemitic act".

While there are other Jewish cemeteries in the Lyon region, including Cimetière de Cusset in Villeurbanne, and the cemetery in Champagne-au-Mont-d'Or, this Jewish cemetery is the only Jewish cemetery in the city of Lyon and, with the Jewish cemetery of La Boisse in l'Ain, is administered by the Israelite Central Consistory of Lyon.

== Description ==
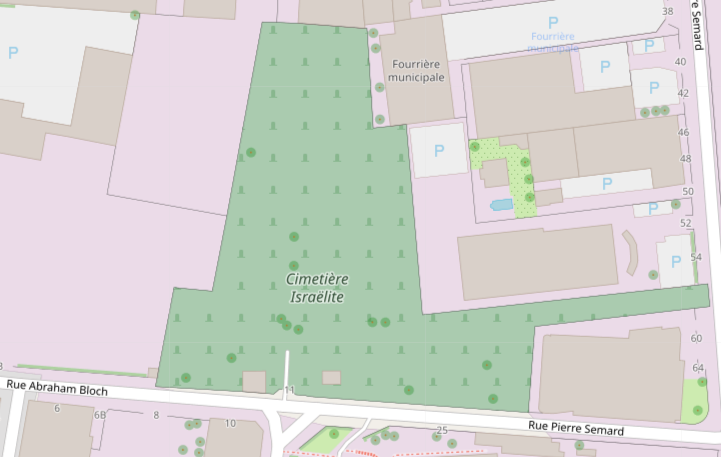
Map of the cemetery

Located on Rue Abraham-Bloch in the Gerland neighborhood of the city, the cemetery covers an area of 7000 square meters and includes 4900 tombs which were inventoried in a study published in 2003. It opens with a black portal bearing four golden stars of David.

At the center is a monument to the memories of Jewish soldiers who fell in the line of duty and Jews who were deported from France during the Holocaust. The cemetery is closed on Saturdays and Jewish holidays.

== Celebrations ==
Each year shortly before Rosh Hashanah the cemetery holds a "ceremony of remembrance for martyrs and victims of Nazi barbarism". The Chief Rabbi of Lyon presides over the ceremony which honor the memory of those deported, killing and those deprived of burial. It notably bears the memory of former Chief Rabbi of Lyon Abraham Bloch (1859–1914), killed during the First World War while giving a crucifix to a dying Catholic soldier who mistook him for a priest. The gesture is considered one of the most fervent expressions of respect for a belief other than ones own.

== Bibliography ==
- Étienne Troller, Manuela Wyler, Relevé du cimetière juif de la Mouche (Lyon), Cercle de généalogie juive, 2003, ISBN 2-912785-24-3
- Dominique Bertin (15 April 2013). Guide de Lyon et ses cimetières (in French). Éditions lyonnaises d'art et d'histoire. ISBN 978-2-84147-309-0. Wikidata Q60374955.
