= Rue de Créqui =

Thoroughfare in Lyon, France

Avenue de Créqui
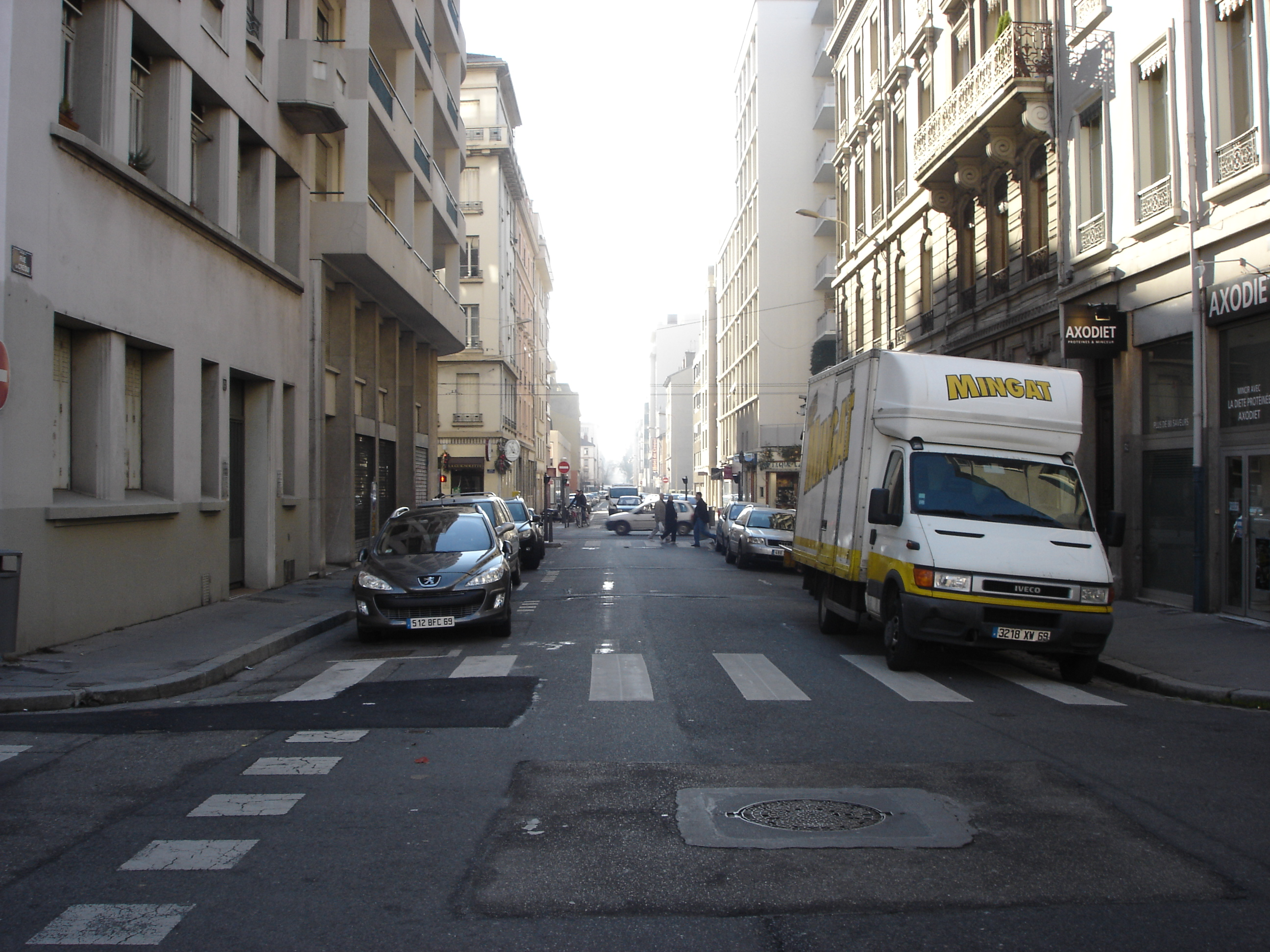
- The street, just at the north of the Cours Lafayette
- Former name(s): Rue des Martyrs
- Type: Street
- Location: 3rd, 6th and 7th arrondissements of Lyon, Lyon, France
- Postal code: 69003, 69006, 69007
- Coordinates: 45.763624°N 4.847015°E

La Rue de Créqui is a very long street located in the 7th, 3rd and 6th arrondissements of Lyon. It is a long straight line along the Rue Duguesclin or the Rue de Vendôme, that begins on the Grande Rue de la Guillotière in the 7th arrondissement and ends at the north in the 6th, on the Boulevard des Belges. It follows the Place Guichard, located in the 3rd arrondissement.

== History ==
The street was named as tribute of a family of Artois which several members were famous, including Charles 1st (1578–1638), Duke of Lesdiguieres, Lieutenant General of the Dauphine, whom the street is named after.

It was established from the Restoration to the end of the Second Empire: it was first opened until the Cours Lafayette in the early 19th century, then part of the third arrondissement in 1860 and was finally completed by its eastern part about 1875. To the north, the street was then called by its current name, but at the time it stopped at the monument of victims of the siege of Lyon, which was much larger than today. The street was first called the Rue de la Concorde in 1848. In the south, it was called the Rue des Martyrs between 1872 and 1874, having been so named in memory of the massacres of the Terror (1793–1794). Finally, it was named the Rue de Créqui in 1878. Its extension was later approved by the City Council, on 27 March 1890.

The place where the war memorial stands was previously a wasteland. An expiatory chapel was built by the Count of Artois from 21 October 1814. Works started again in 1817 and the first mass was celebrated on 29 May 1819.

Draftsman Jean Dumas was an inhabitant of the street in 1885.

== Description and architecture ==
The street begins with two large buildings on the Boulevard des Belges, then is lined with 20th-century buildings, except near the Cours Franklin Roosevelt where they are older. Then, administrative buildings of various volumes are grouped into the Rue Royer. Several shops are decorated with frescoes in the 6th arrondissement. Then there are older houses (after the Rue Mazenod), green spaces and the playground (after the Rue Rancy), and pétanque ground (after the Avenue Faure).

Among the famous monuments, there is the Bourse du Travail and several religious buildings, mostly constructed in the 19th century (Église de la Rédemption, Église Saint-Pothin, Anglican church, memorial of the Lyon martyrs, Chapelle Sainte-Croix, Église Saint Louis). The street is mainly composed of many law firms, a library, several restaurants and the Croix Rouge Lyonnaise.
