= 6th arrondissement of Lyon =

Administrative division of Lyon, France

- Municipal arrondissement
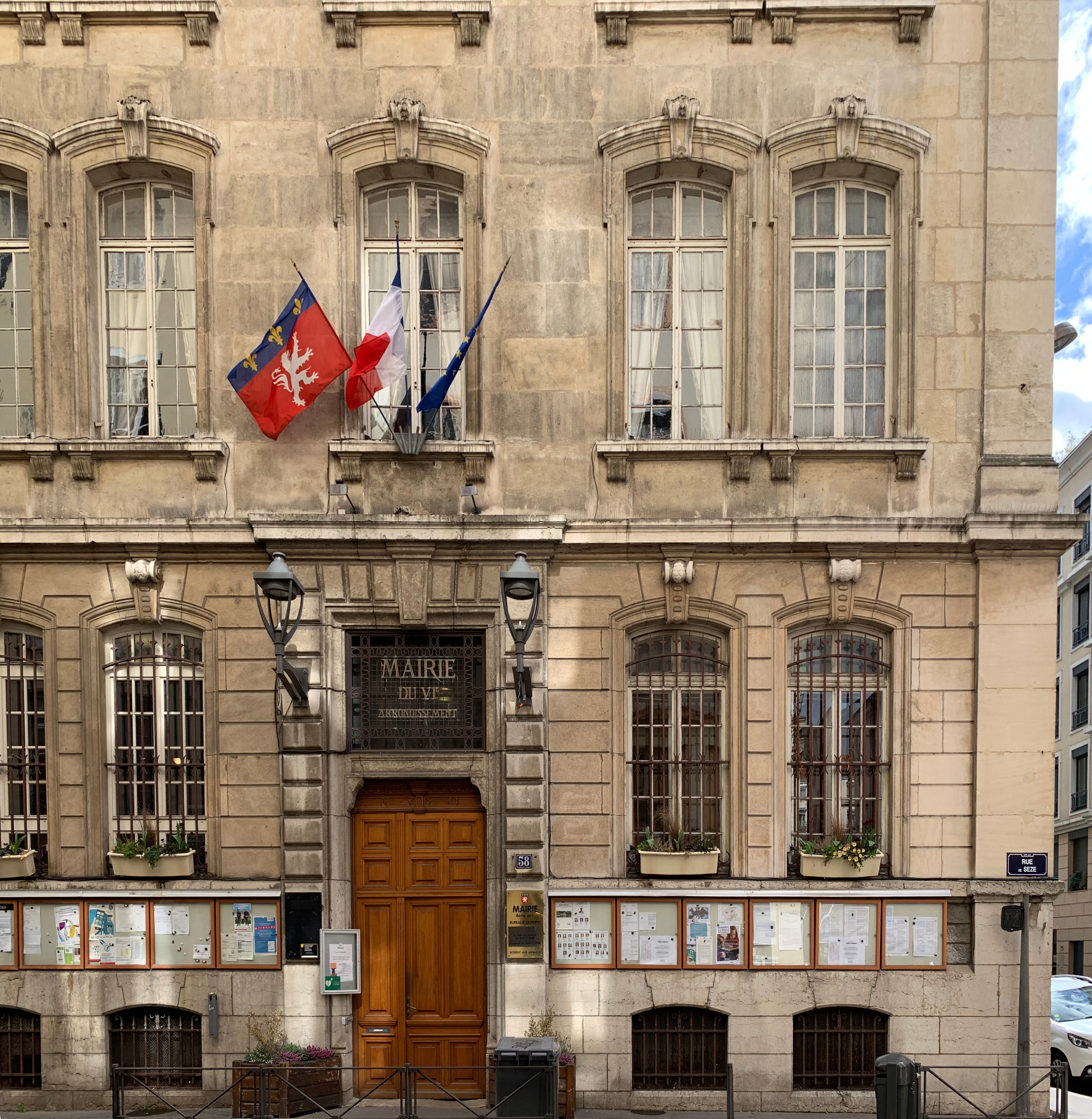
- Mairie of the 6th arrondissement

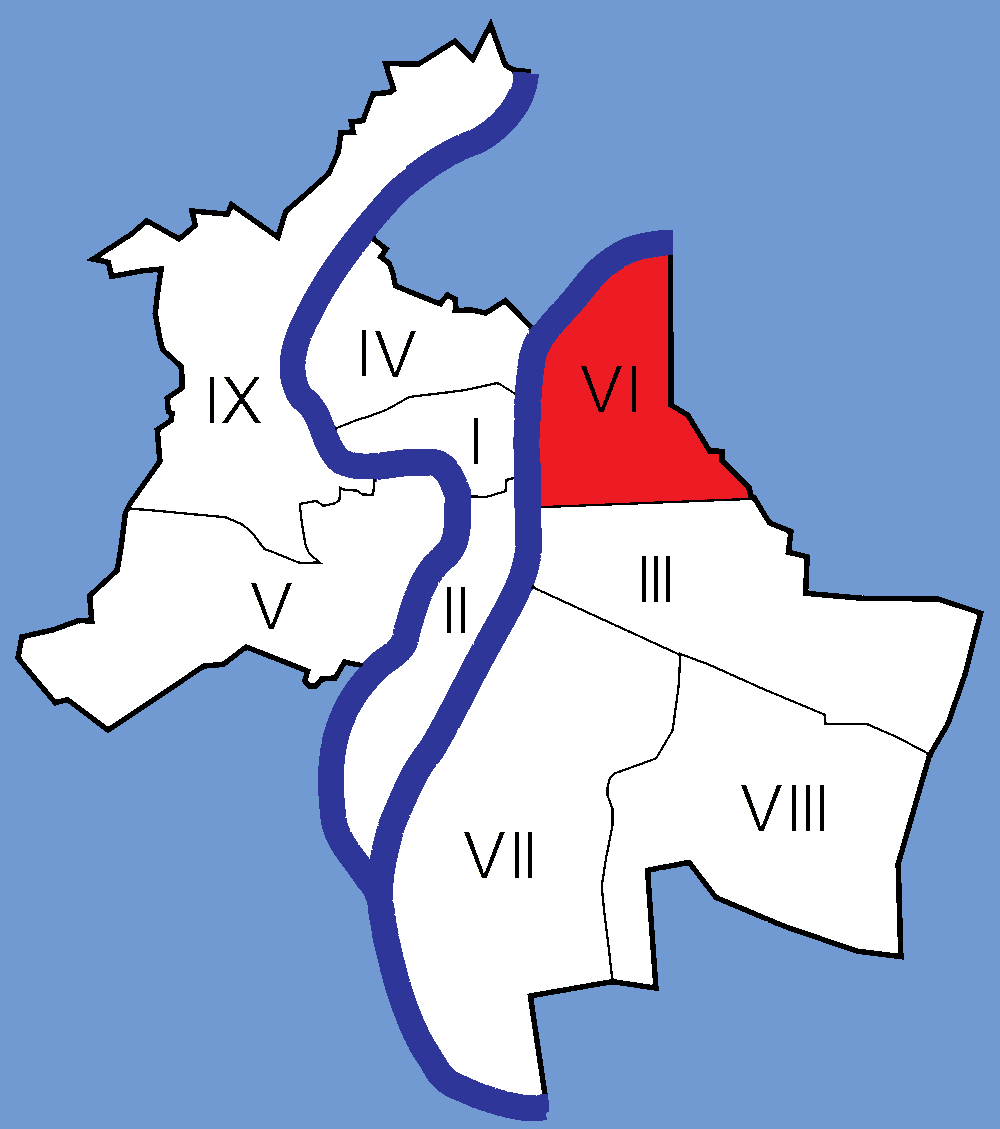
- Location within Lyon
- Coordinates: 45°46′18″N 4°51′17″E
- Country: France
- Region: Auvergne-Rhône-Alpes
- Department: Lyon Metropolis
- Commune: Lyon

Government
  - Mayor (2020–2026): Pascal Blache
- Area: 3.77 km^{2} (1.46 sq mi)
- Population (2023): 49,385
  - Density: 13,100/km^{2} (33,900/sq mi)
- INSEE code: 69386

The nine arrondissements of Lyon

Arrondissements of Lyon

The 6th arrondissement of Lyon (French: 6^{e} arrondissement de Lyon) is one of the nine arrondissements of the City of Lyon.

== Geography ==
This zone is served by metro lines and and tram lines and.

=== Quarters ===
- Les Brotteaux

=== Streets and squares ===
- Boulevard des Belges
- Rue de Créqui
- Rue Duguesclin
- Rue Garibaldi
- Rue Tronchet
- Rue de Vendôme

== Monuments ==
- Église Saint-Pothin
- Gare des Brotteaux

== Cultural activities ==
- Musée d'art contemporain de Lyon

== See also ==
- Cité Internationale
