= Centre d'histoire de la résistance et de la déportation =

Museum in Lyon, France

Coordinates: 45°44′49″N 4°50′8.9″E

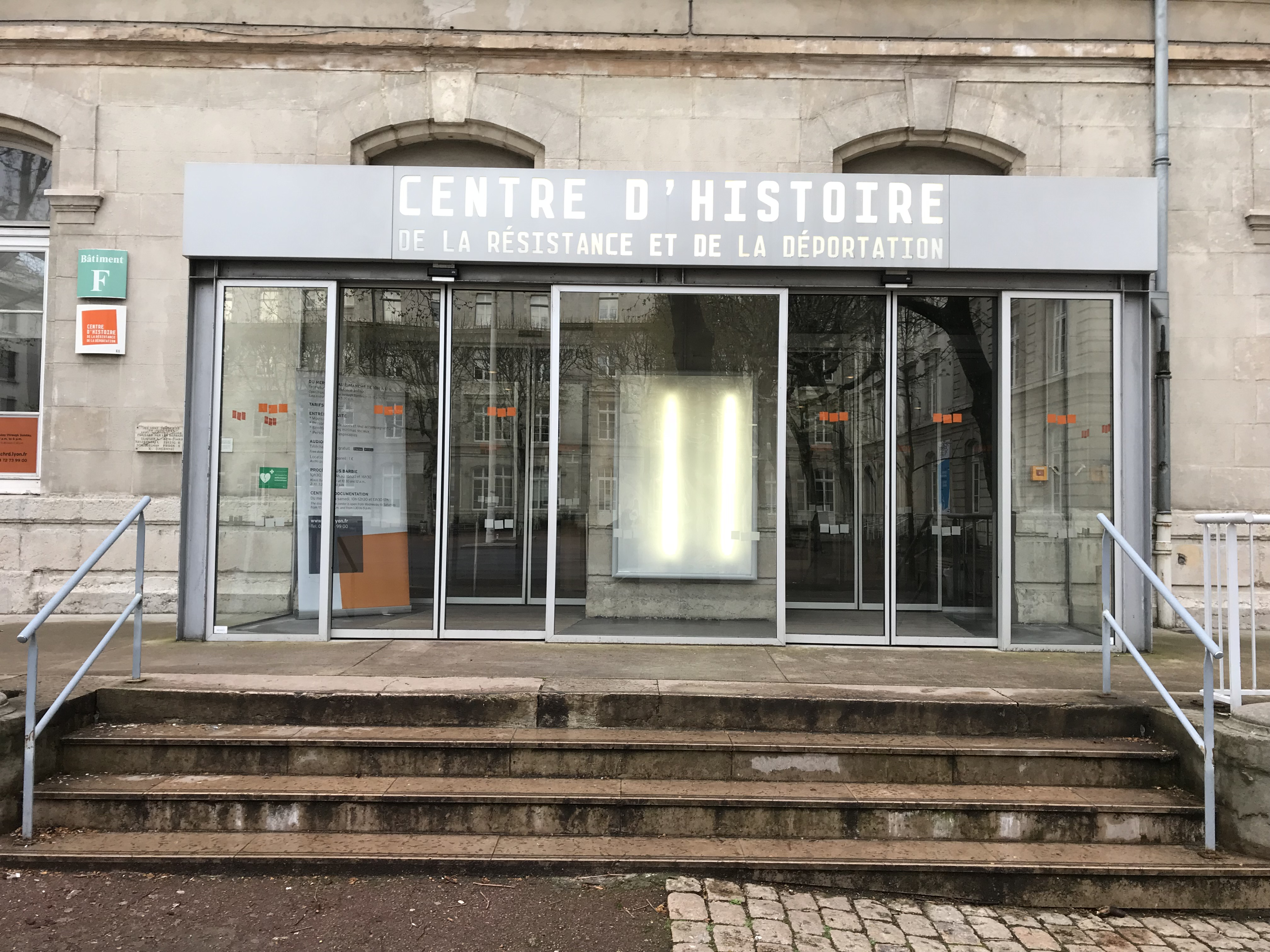
Museum

The Centre d'histoire de la résistance et de la déportation (French pronunciation: [sɑ̃tʁ distwaʁ də la ʁezistɑ̃s e də la depɔʁtasjɔ̃], lit. 'Center for the History of the Resistance and Deportation') is a museum in Lyon, France.

Located on the former site of a French military health school (École de Santé Militaire) and opened in 1992, it chronicles the French Resistance as well as Jewish deportation in World War II.

== History ==
The school was occupied by the Germans in the spring of 1943, and used by Lyon's Gestapo chief, Klaus Barbie, to torture resistance members, including Jean Moulin. It was destroyed by Allied aircraft on May 26, 1944.

In 1965, on the occasion of the 20th anniversary of the Liberation, former resistance fighters and deportees from Lyon formed an association with a view to creating a museum of the Second World War, devoted more particularly to the resistance and the deportation of resistance fighters. A first museum opened its doors on May 8, 1967. It was installed in two rooms of the Natural History Museum of Lyon located rue Boileau (6th arrondissement).

During the 1980s, the association of Friends of the Resistance and Deportation Museum asked the City of Lyon to obtain larger premises. This request met with a particular echo at the time of the trial of Klaus Barbie, which was held from May 11 to July 4, 1987, before the Rhône Court of Assizes. Former head of the Gestapo and torturer, Klaus Barbie was tried for crimes against humanity (the first trial under this charge in France).

Following this trial, in 1989, the mayor of Lyon Michel Noir entrusted Alain Jacubowicz (deputy delegate for citizens' rights and lawyer for the civil parties during the Barbie trial) with the mission of supporting the creation of a dedicated municipal museum to World War II.

The museum itself was inaugurated on October 15, 1992.

On July 16, 2017, the CHRD esplanade was named Pierre Robert de Saint-Vincent.

== Public transit ==
This zone is served by tram line at the station Centre Berthelot–Sciences Po Lyon in front of the building. It is also served nearby by métro line at the station Jean Macé and by regional railway services at Lyon-Jean Macé station.
