= Le Bachut =

Coordinates: 45°44′11″N 4°52′11″E

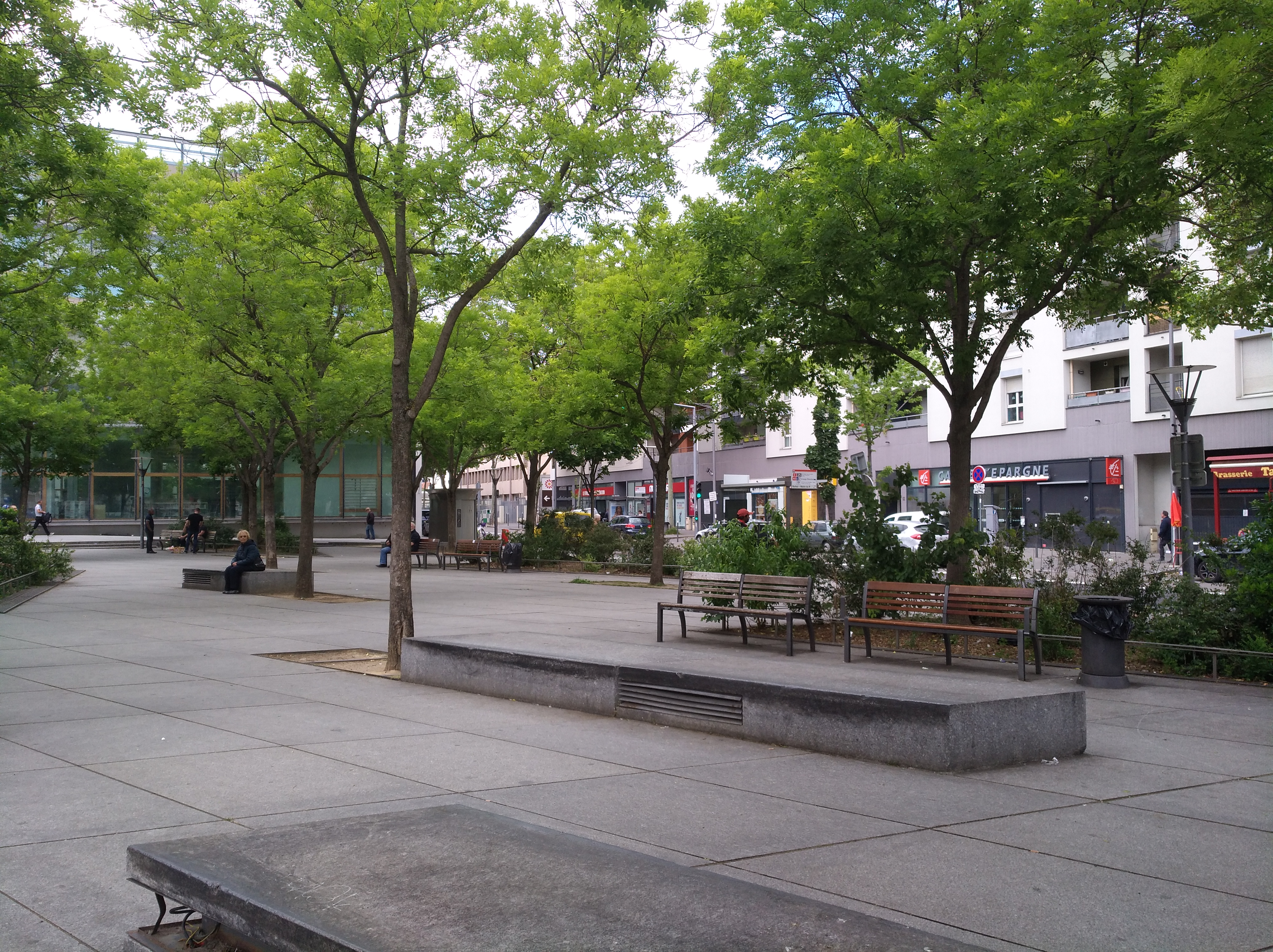
La Bachut

Le Bachut [lə baʃy] is a quarter in the 8th arrondissement of Lyon.

It is bisected the avenue Berthelot and rue Marius Berliet. Served by the tram, it is connected to the Presqu'île, to the Hôpital Édouard-Herriot and the university campus of Bron. In May 2007, the library of Bachut called Médiathèque Marguerite Duras was inaugurated, at the Place du 11 November 1918. The Maison de la danse of Lyon is in the quarter.

== History ==
During the Second World War, the square of Bachut was extended and the avenue Berthelot enlarged. At the time, J.H. Lambert planned for the post-war the construction of 6,840 housing units focused on the avenue Berthelot extended (current avenue Jean Mermoz), but these projects were eventually cancelled.

In 1959, the 8th quarter was created. In the 1950s, the urbanization of the avenue Jean Mermoz was done: nine buildings from two to fifteen storeys to the north, forty-seven villas and seven buildings from two to twelve floors in the south. Maximum space was released between buildings to allow good ventilation and optimal sunlight optimal. In the 1960s, Bachut appeared as a line of life cut off from the rest of the quarter including the quarter of the États-Unis (a quarter of the 8th arrondissement) because of the barrier formed by the Paris-Rhone and Lenzburg factories. The quarter has a mix of low-rise buildings and HLM, which is not conducive to a homogeneous neighborhood life. Then the municipality, to create a neighborhood center, asked the architect Bourdeix to do a complex including a public hall and a theater: the avenue Berthelot was expanded and the road junction Heyrieux-avenue Jean Mermoz was laid out.

With the completion of the tramway in 2001, the Place du 11 Novembre, always known Bachut, was relaid out. In May 2007, the Bachut became the center of the quarter with the construction of the Médiathèque Marguerite Duras.
