= Laënnec =

Coordinates: 45°44′18″N 4°53′05″E

Laënnec [la.ɛn.ɛk] is a quarter of the 8th arrondissement of Lyon, in France. It is served by the eponymous station of the Line D of the Lyon Metro, which was opened on 11 December 1992 and had 132,316 passengers per month in 2006. Notable monuments of the quarter are the Grand Mosque of Lyon, located in the Boulevard Pinel, the Faculty of Medicine, the Faculty of Dentistry and the Maison des jeunes et de la culture.

The quarter is named after French physician and medical writer René Laennec.
