= Lyon-Jean Macé station =

Railway station in the 7th arrondissement of Lyon, France

Lyon-Jean Macé
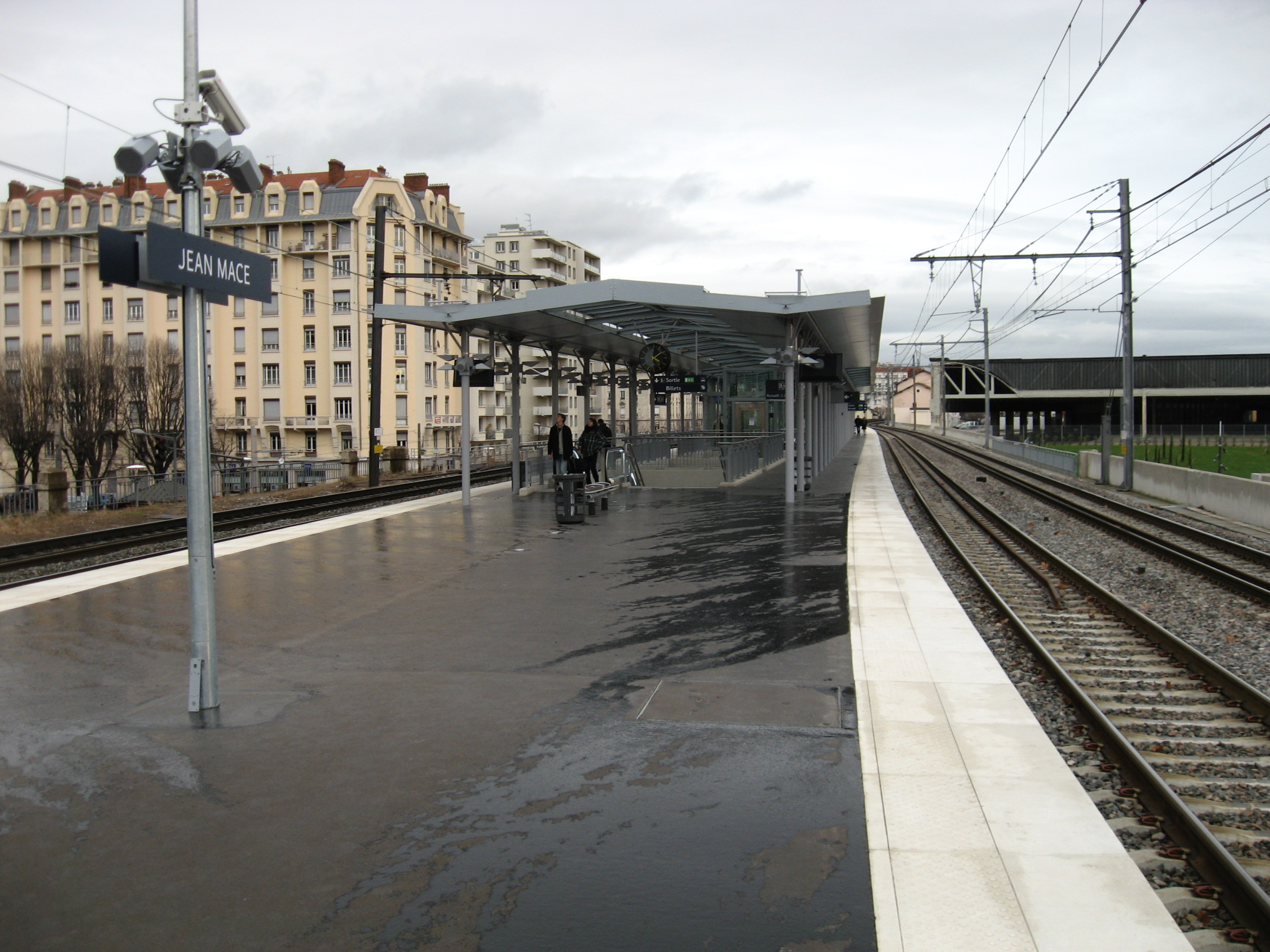

General information
- Location: France
- Coordinates: 45.7451°N 4.8416°E
- Owner: SNCF
- Operator: SNCF
- Connections: Lyon Metro Lyon Metro Line B Lyon tramway Lyon tramway#Line T2

Other information
- Station code: 87282624

History
- Opened: 13 December 2009; 16 years ago

Passengers
- 2024: 1,817,787

Services
Preceding station	TER Auvergne-Rhône-Alpes	Following station
Lyon-Perrache Terminus	1	Vénissieux towards Saint-André-le-Gaz
Lyon-Perrache towards Lyon-Vaise	5	Saint-Fons towards Avignon-Centre
Connections to other stations
Preceding station	Lyon Metro	Following station
Saxe–Gambetta towards Charpennes–Charles Hernu	Line B transfer at Jean Macé	Place Jean Jaurès towards Saint-Genis-Laval–Hôpital Lyon Sud
Preceding station	Lyon tramway	Following station
Centre Berthelot–Sciences Po Lyon towards Hôtel de Région–Montrochet	Line T2 transfer at Jean Macé	Garibaldi–Berthelot towards Saint-Priest–Bel Air
Location

Lyon-Jean Macé station (French: Gare de Lyon-Jean Macé) is a railway station in the 7th arrondissement of Lyon. It is situated on the Paris–Marseille railway and the Lyon–Geneva railway. The station is a part of the Lyon urban area rapid transit network. It was aimed to decongest the major stations Part-Dieu and Perrache while allowing access to the public transport of Lyon (TCL). The station began operation on 13 December 2009.

== History ==
The station was initially planned to be an unstaffed station, intended to lighten passenger load at the main Lyon stations while permitting access to the local transport network. However, the project expanded to include the redevelopment of the area surrounding the railway station, and plans came to envisage Jean-Macé station becoming the sixth station of Lyon, joining Lyon-Perrache, Lyon Vaise, Lyon-Saint-Paul, Lyon-Gorge de Loup and Lyon Part-Dieu. The project, under the supervision of works of RFF and SNCF and costing about 30 million euros, has benefited from the shared commitment of all partners and financial markets: Le Grand Lyon (37%), Région Rhône-Alpes (36.5%), Réseau Ferré de France (19.8%), Sytral (5.3%), SNCF (1.3%).

The station allows passengers to regional trains from Bourgoin-Jallieu, La Tour-du-Pin, Saint-André-le-Gaz, Vienne, Valence, Mâcon and Villefranche-sur-Saône, according to their final destination, to use the new station as additional entry point in the center of Lyon.

The station was officially opened on 8 December 2009, and five days later it opened to the public. The first year, 3800 passengers per day were expected, including 1,800 new customers, and the goal is to reach 6600 passengers for 2015.

== Location and description ==
The station is located on the railway bridge which is parallel to the avenue Berthelot and perpendicular to the avenue Jean-Jaurès. It is served by line B of the metro, the tram T2, many city buses (lines C4, C7, C12, C14, 35, S3, Zi6), a taxi station and two Vélo'v stations.

It is accessed via two entrances on both sides of the avenue, under the bridge. In the halls, a screen displays real-time the next departures of the different transport in Lyon from the pole Jean Macé.

This station is the first one in Lyon to be equipped with a collective record that can accommodate 110 bicycles.

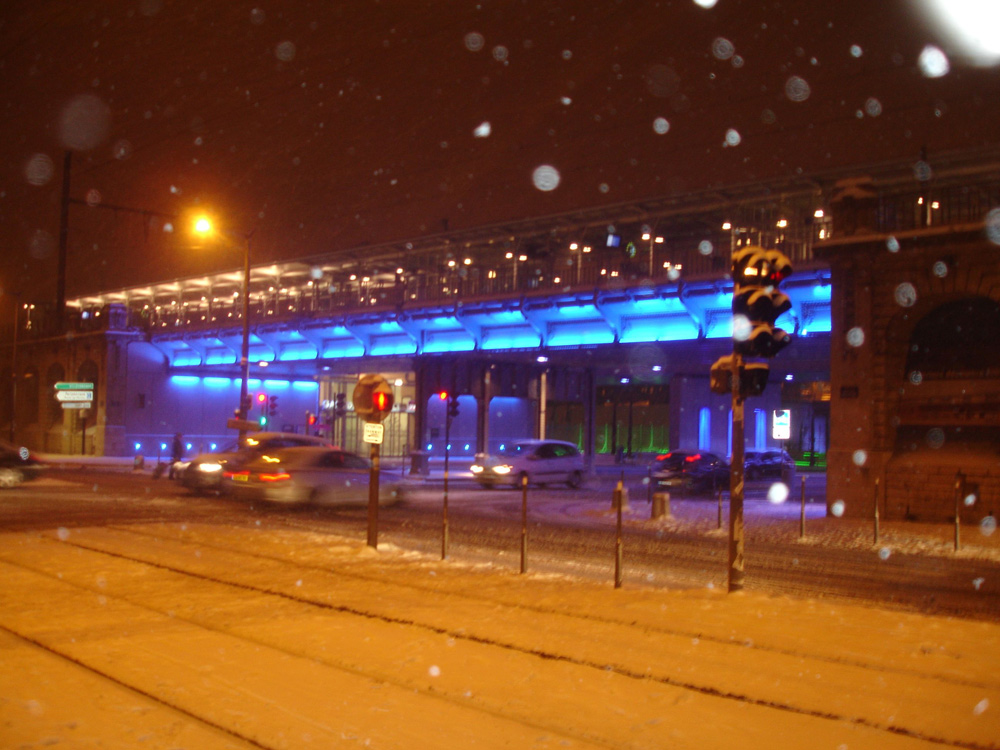
Jean Macé railway station, on 9 January 2010

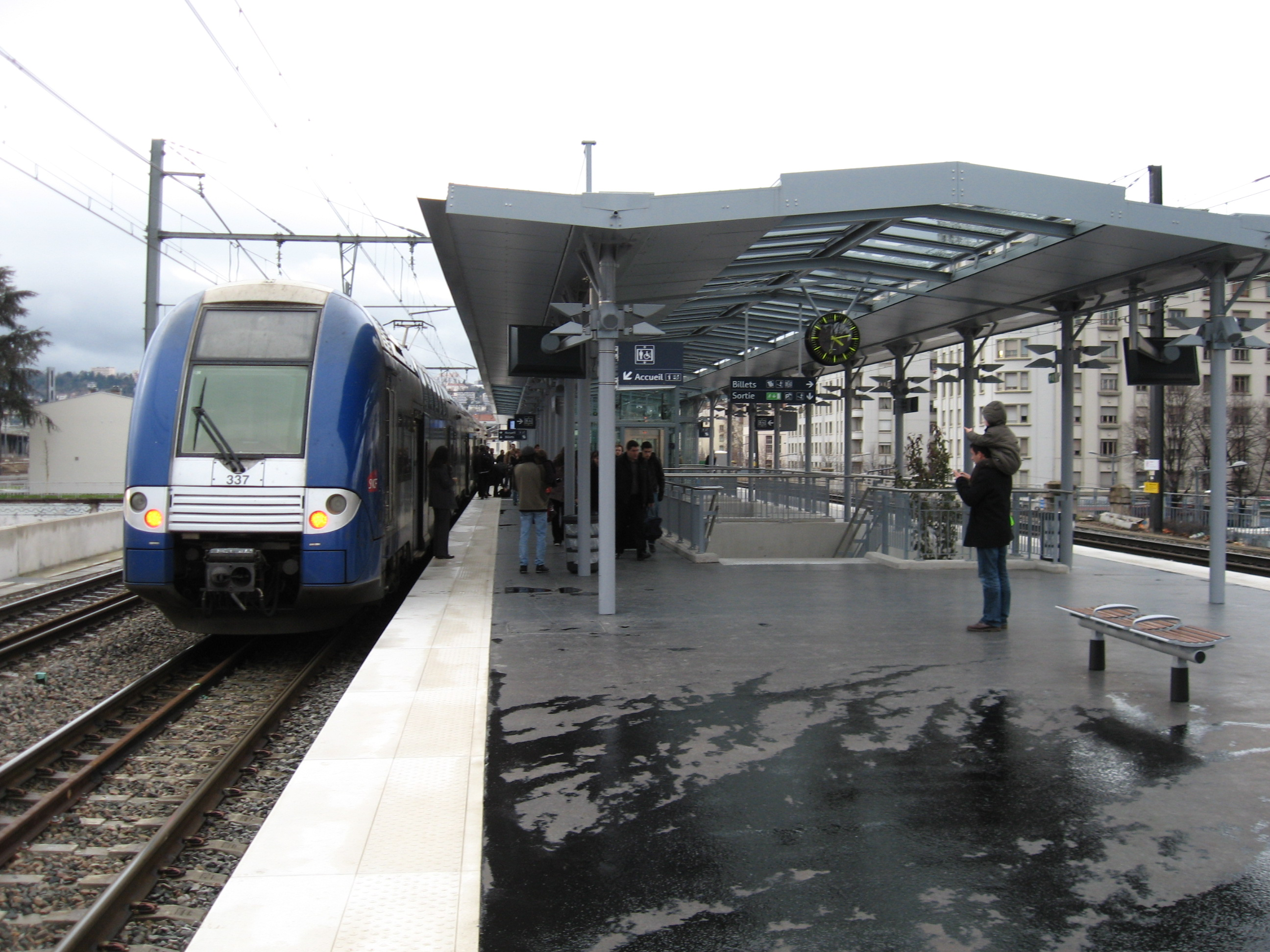
A TER train to Perrache, on 1 January 2010

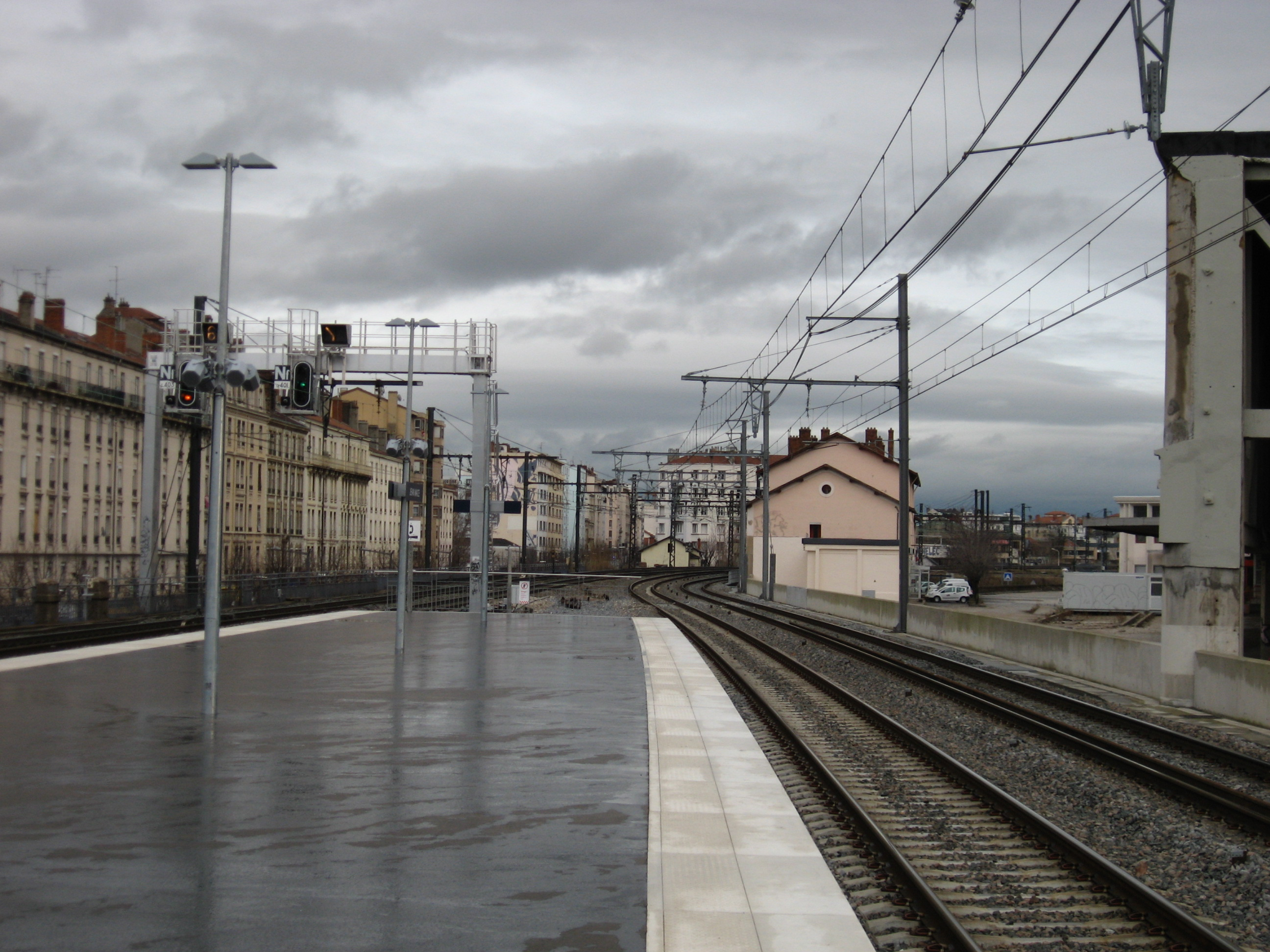
View of the eastern rails

== See also ==
- Place Jean-Macé
- Transport in Rhône-Alpes
- TER Auvergne-Rhône-Alpes
