= Rue de Vendôme =

Thoroughfare in Lyon, France

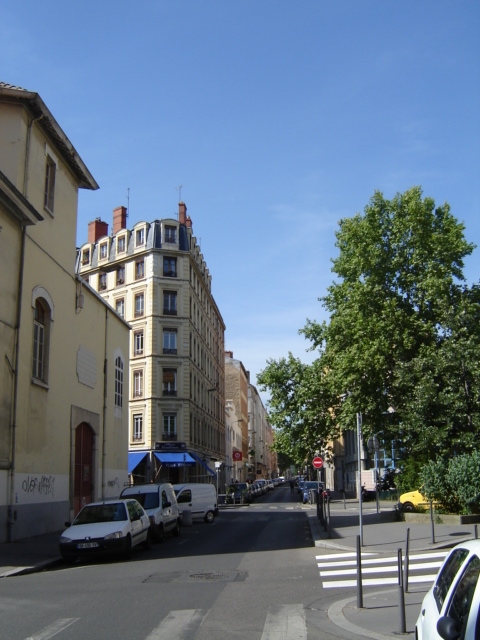
- The street, near the Cours Gambetta, in the 3rd arrondissement
- Type: Street
- Location: 3rd and 6th arrondissements of Lyon, Lyon, France
- Postal code: 69003, 69006
- Coordinates: 45.764814°N 4.845891°E

The Rue de Vendôme is a very long street located in Lyon. It begins with the Avenue de Grande Bretagne, along the Rhône, in the 6th arrondissement, and ends with the Cours Gambetta, in the 3rd arrondissement, after crossing the Place Guichard.

== History ==
The street was opened in 1835. Until 1855, the first part of the street, at north of the Cours Franklin Roosevelt (then named Cours Morand), was called Rue de Grammond, as tribute to Luc Urbain de Bouexic, comte de Guichen. It was then named Rue des Martyrs because people were slaughtered in the street in 1793. In 1939, part of the street became the Rue Jean-Marie Chavant.

The northern part of the street was created by the Lyon architect Jean-Antoine Morand in late 18th century, almost completed in 1848, then extended to the south by the prefect Claude-Marius Vaïsse in 1857. Several houses in the street were built by architects Journoud, Lablatinière, Prosper Bissuel and Felix Bellemain. In 1881, the workshops of the great organ builder Merklin and Co. were installed at number 11. Draftsman Pierre-Marie Mortamais lived in the street in 1895.

== Architecture and associations ==
There are a Seventh-day Adventist Church, the consulates of Sweden, Malta and Italy, mainly food and furnitures stores, schools, restaurants, a genealogical library, a center of Alcoholics Anonymous and many doctors' offices, among other things.

The street starts with all aligned houses, then narrows to the Place Puvis and is then composed of three one-floor houses and several middle-class buildings of the late 19th century. After the Church of Redemption, there are several five-floor buildings of the 19th century, highly decorated with wrought iron balconies. Then, after the Rue de Sèze, the street becomes very wide with a double row of trees and sculpted buildings. Then, the architecture is simple and varied with homes of all ages. A house is wholly covered with pink tiles. An iron lyre can be seen on the balcony of No. 280.
