= Les Brotteaux station =

Railway station in Lyon, France

Gare des Brotteaux
- Gare de Genève
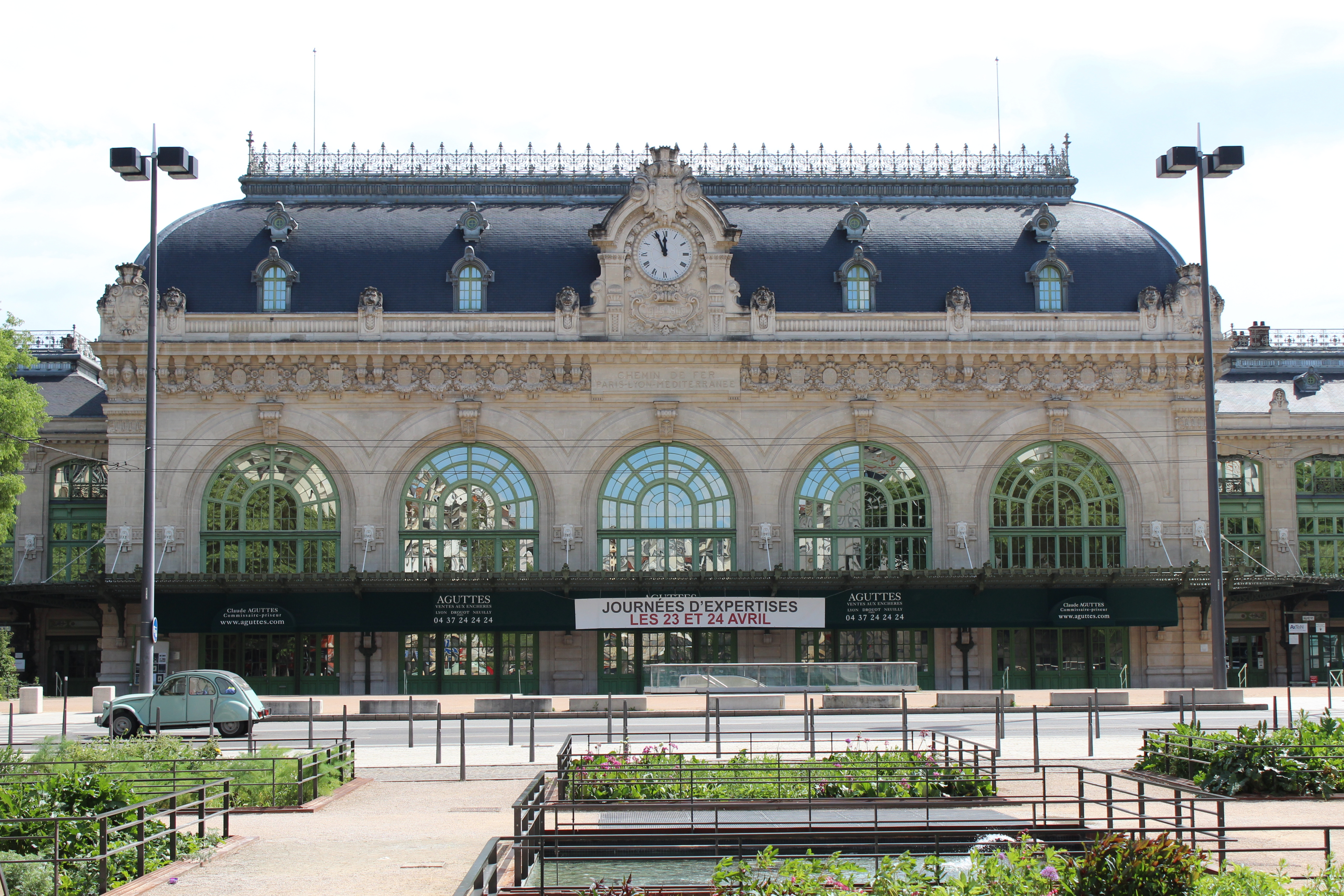
- Facade of the railway station
- Interactive map of the Gare des Brotteaux area

General information
- Location: 6th arrondissement of Lyon, Lyon, France
- Coordinates: 45.7672°N 4.8598°E
- Construction started: 1858
- Completed: 1908
- Inaugurated: 29 March 1908
- Owner: Réseau Ferré de France

Design and construction
- Architect: Paul d'Arbaut

The Gare des Brotteaux was one of Lyon's two main railway stations, with Gare de Perrache, located in the Brotteaux quarter, in the 6th arrondissement. It closed in 1983 with the opening of the new Lyon-Part-Dieu station. The former railway station building is now classified as monuments historiques.

== History ==
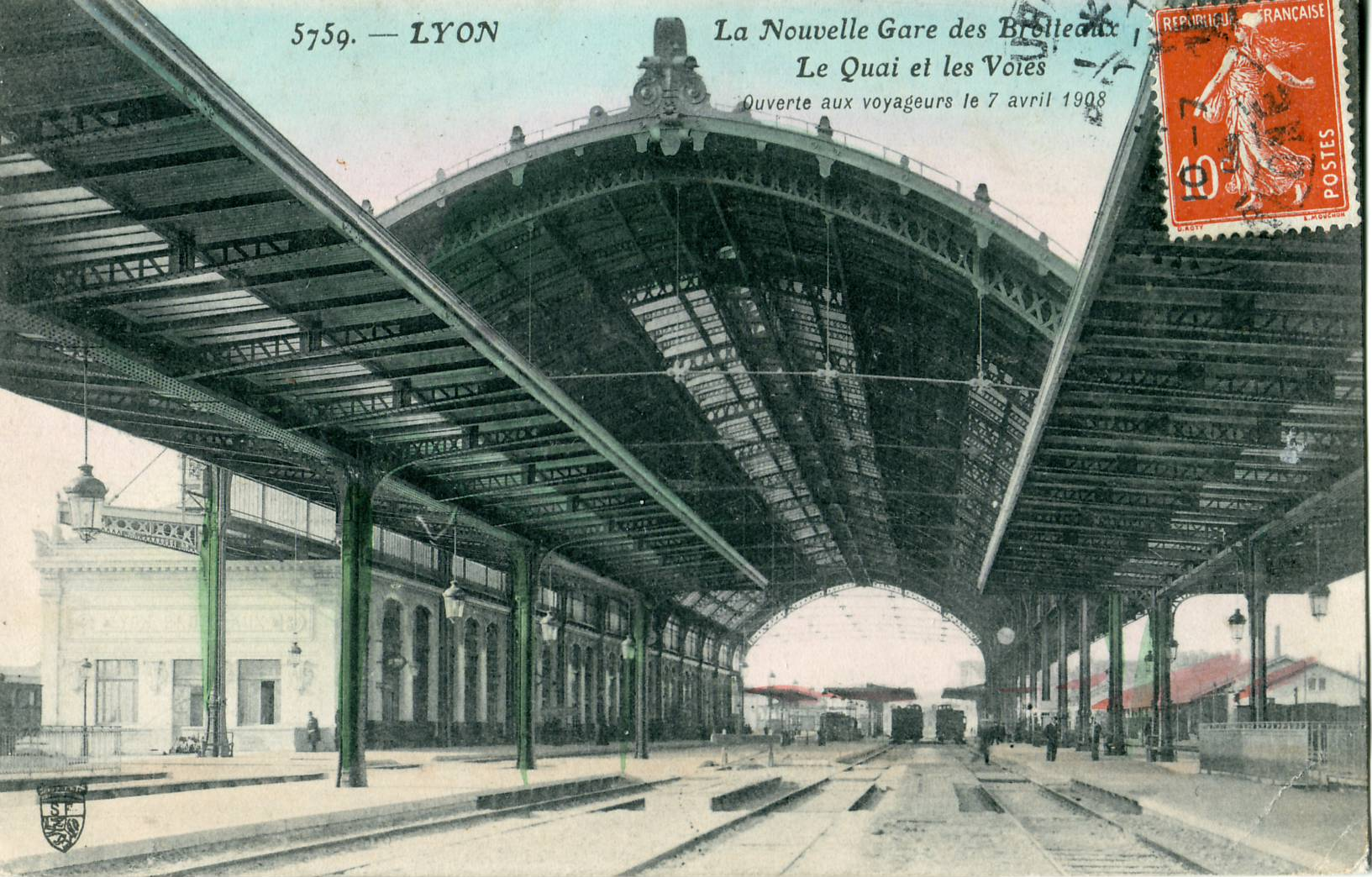
Old photo of the station shed which have been destroyed in 1985.

Built by the Paris-Lyon-Méditerranée company (PLM), and especially by Parisian architect Paul d'Arbaut and engineer Victor-Louis Rascol, the station served the line to Ambérieu-en-Bugey and Geneva. Its style is almost the same as the Gare d'Orsay which was built at the same time. The first station, called Gare de Genève, was created in 1858, then was replaced by the current station, built in 1904 and inaugurated on 29 March 1908.

== The new railway station ==
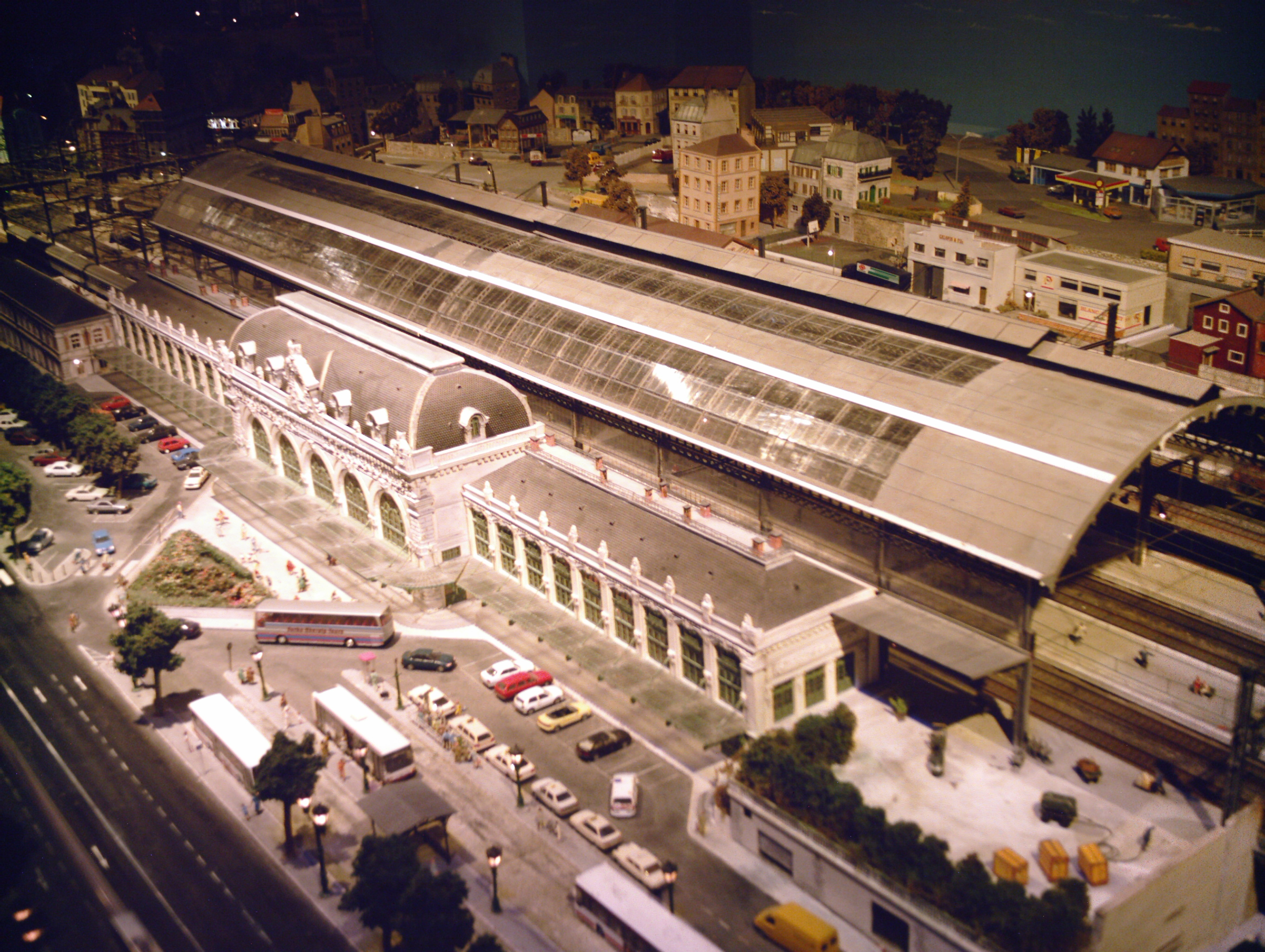
Reconstruction of the current Gare des Brotteaux, at the Musée du train miniature, in Châtillon-sur-Chalaronne

Since 1982, facades, roofs and the salle des pas perdus were classified as monuments historiques. The station closed on 13 June 1983, when the Gare de la Part-Dieu, 700 meters further south, began to be used, because it would have to be renovated (to build new platforms, to solve traffic problems, access and parking of vehicles). While its majestic platform roof was dismantled in 1985. The building for passengers kept its original decor with paintings by several artists, including Charles Lacour, Antoine Barbier and Clovis Terreire. The building was refurbished in 1988 by architect Yves Heskia. The same year, the station was sold by the SNCF and currently hosts the auction house of Jean-Claude Anaf, the Brasserie de l'Est by Paul Bocuse, the architectural workshop Arche, among other things.

In 2002, the monument was labeled « Patrimoine du XXe siècle » (Heritage of the twentieth century).

The station was renovated between 2002 and 2006 for a total cost of 7.141 million euros.

== Architecture ==
The architectural detail of the railway station consists of bay windows, plant motifs and art castings. Crests and mosaics are displayed on the facade.
