= Boulevard des Belges =

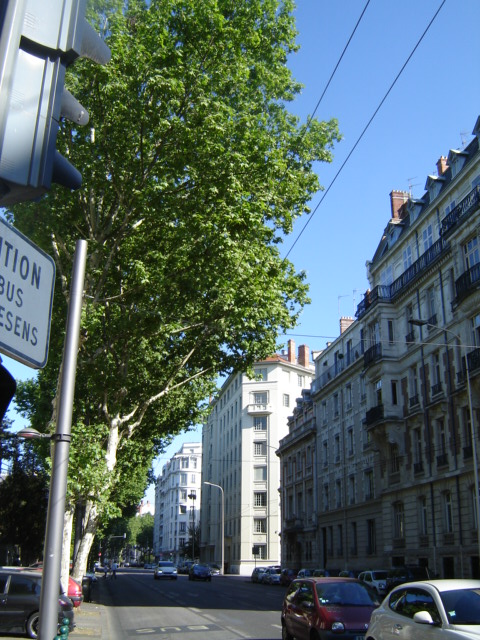
- The street viewed from the Porte Duquesne of the Parc de la Tête d'Or
- Former name(s): Boulevard du Nord
- Type: Boulevard
- Location: 6th arrondissement of Lyon, Lyon, France
- Postal code: 69006
- Coordinates: 45.77331°N 4.851475°E

The Boulevard des Belges is a wide and posh avenue located in Les Brotteaux quarter, in the 6th arrondissement of Lyon. It begins with the Quai de Grande Bretagne, runs along the southern part of the Parc de la Tête d'Or until the Avenue Verguin and ends on the Place Jules Ferry, in front of the Gare des Brotteaux. The boulevard is lined with plane trees and is served by two velo'v stations and the line B of the metro.

== History ==
In the 19th century, before the houses building, there were a few huts where notably lived a famous magician, and the street was mostly populated by poor people; however, the street was pleasant for walkers. It was largely built on the site of the old ditches that formed the walls of Lyon, erected under the reign of Louis Philippe. The boulevard was developed under the Second Empire, but the last two military buildings were not removed until 1890. In 1897, Lyon Mayor Antoine Gailleton enacted a regulation on buildings bordering the park at the northern side: he banned the shops and the heights above three storeys. The first buildings on this side of the boulevard began in 1900 and were spread during the first half of the 20th century. Formerly named Boulevard du Nord, it was renamed in 1916, after deliberation of the Municipal council on 14 July 1914, to pay tribute to the resilience of the Belgian army in 1914, like the rue d'Anvers in the 7th arrondissement, and the rue d'Ypres, in the 4th arrondissement. Several buildings, including the odd numbers from 55 to 65, were built by architects Henry Despierre and L. Roux-Meulière in the 1880s.

Édouard Aynard, one of the founders of the Crédit Lyonnais, was one of the first inhabitants of the street.

== Architecture ==
At the northern side, along the park, there are mansions and small luxury buildings that reflect the eclectic architecture of Lyon from the late 19th until the mid-20th century (Napoleon III, Art Nouveau, 1930s styles, Le Corbusier...). Legally, the buildings may not have more than three storeys in this part of the street. Until No. 63 which is in front of the large tropical greenhouses of the Parc de la Tête d'Or, the odd numbers houses are separated from the park only by a grid and their own garden. These belong to the richest inhabitants of Lyon and only the initials of these people are mentioned on the plaques of doors. There are two yellow stone mansions at No. 33 and two identical buildings paved with marble at No. 35 and 37. In front of the rue Duquesne and the Rue de la Tête d'Or, there are two flags adorned with figures surrendering the green gates with golden lions sculpted that overlook the park. After the Avenue Verguin, a small square, then early 20th-century buildings can be seen.

At the southern side, buildings were built in the early, then in the middle of the 20th century. After the rue de Créqui, the buildings are composed of four to eight storeys, then after the Avenue Verguin, many even numbers buildings have half-columns in advance.

Several buildings of the street have a noteworthy architecture, including the Nos. 14, 14 bis, 18, 52, 54 and 58. The No. 15 is the hotel Vibert built by architect François Rostagnat for founder of Pétrole Hahn society Laurent Vibert. Nos. 18 and 66 are bourgeois buildings made by Marius Bornarel in 1931. At No. 45, sculptures and ironworks are Art Nouveau-styled. The building at Nos. 65-67 shows color contrasts, mixing white and pink stones. At Nos. 82 and 99, there are two luxuous houses typical of the Haussman style of the late 19th-century buildings of the street. The No. 114 is the Art Nouveau hotel Lutétia, created by Martinon in 1910.

== Notable monuments ==
Notable monuments of the street include the former Musée Guimet at No. 28. Built in 1878, this natural history museum, now transferred to the Musée des Confluences, displayed Egyptian and Asian collections, stuffed animals, aquariums and the big skeleton of a mammoth.

The Consulate General of Federal Republic of Germany is situated at No. 33. The building was constructed around the year 1900. Originally a private residence, it was not until 1954 that the Federal Republic of Germany acquired it (the Consulate General was previously in a large apartment on the Place Bellecour). This building is officially classified as monument historique.
