= Rue Duguesclin =

Thoroughfare in Lyon, France

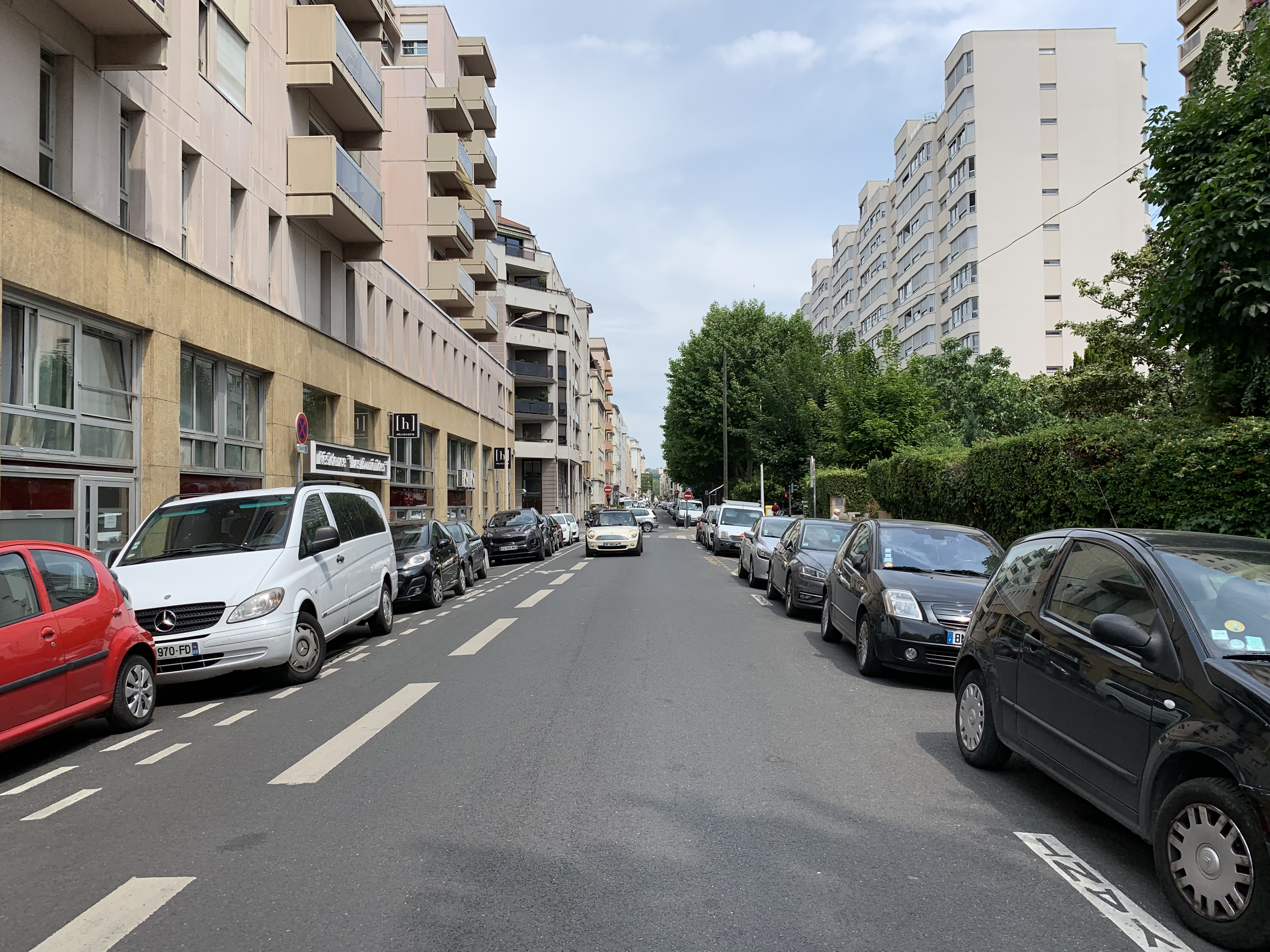
- Length: 2.8 km (1.7 mi)
- Width: 16 m
- Location: 3rd, 6th and 7th arrondissements of Lyon, Lyon, France
- Postal code: 69003, 69006, 69007
- Coordinates: 45.762651°N 4.848452°E

Construction
- Construction start: 19th century

The Rue Duguesclin (or Rue Du Guesclin) is a long street in Lyon crossing directly wholly the 6th and the 3rd arrondissement, and ends in the 7th arrondissement. This 2,800-meter street starts at the Boulevard des Belges and ends on the Rue Rachais. The Lyon inhabitants and the telephone directory usually write the street name in a sole word (Duguesclin) and the cartographers do it in two words (Du Guesclin).

== History ==
The Rue Duguesclin was created gradually in the nineteenth century from Cours Franklin Roosevelt (then named Cours Morand) and was urbanized after 1850. It took its current name in 1852 on its entire length. In 1854, the Avenue Vauban became part of the Rue Duguesclin. The last section after the Rue Moncey was created in 1865.

Until 28 May 1934 (or 1954?), the current Rue Bâtonnier-Jacquier, between the Rue du Béguin and the Rue du Repos, was officially part of the Rue Duguesclin. The street is named after Bertrand du Guesclin (1320-1380), a Constable of France. The part between the Rue de Sèze and the Cours Franklin Roosevelt marks the boundary of the site of the historic center of Lyon.

In the 1850s and 1860s, the notable restaurant Fredouillère was located at number 169 and held many political meetings.

== Description ==
The street is first lined by post-early 19th century buildings of a maximum of ten floors, often with rounded reliefs. After the Rue Cuvier, there are 12-floor buildings and a square, and after the Rue Rabelais, buildings of various courts, an underground car park topped by a garden, then after the Rue Servient, the stone City Hall of the 3rd arrondissement, with capitals and a clock. After La Part-Dieu, the buildings are recent and smaller.

Given its length, there are many buildings, including the headquarters of the bank Saint Olive (built in 1809), and the new Palais de Justice de Lyon. There are also the Odyssey bookshop, restaurants, companies, shops, the OPAC, law firms, doctors' offices, and a police station, among other things.
