= 7th arrondissement of Lyon =

- Municipal arrondissement
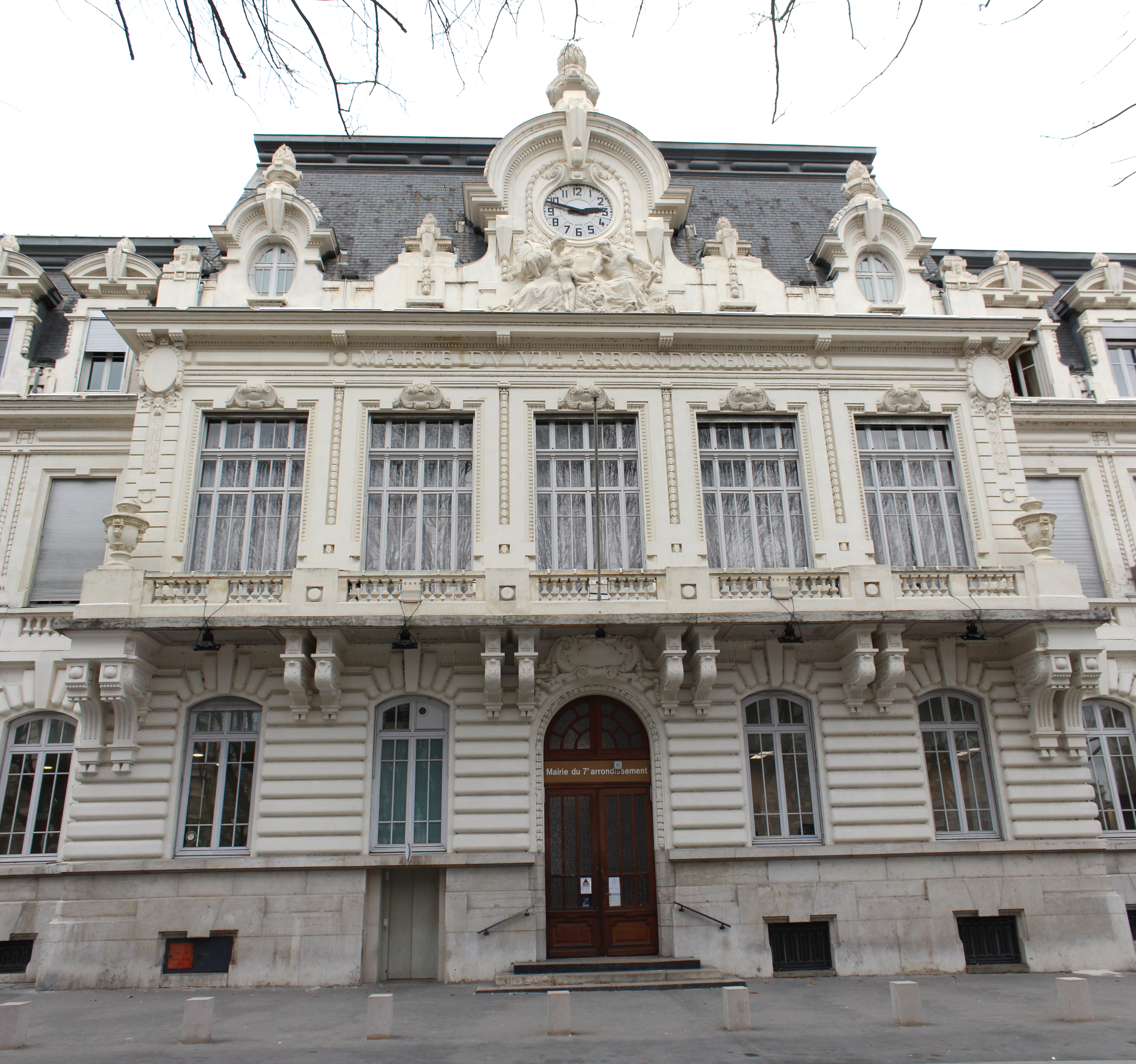
- Mairie of the 7th arrondissement

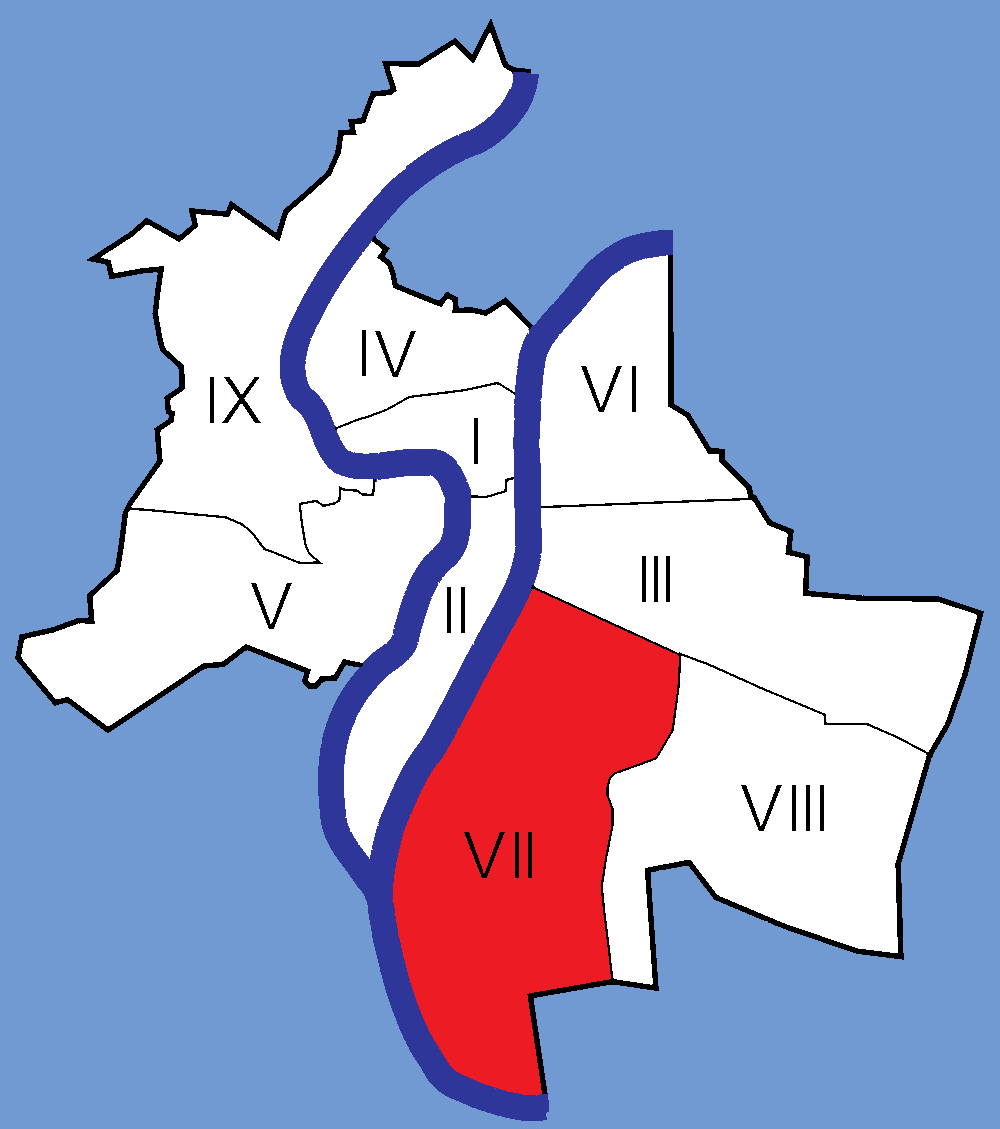
- Location within Lyon
- Coordinates: 45°43′51″N 4°50′25″E
- Country: France
- Region: Auvergne-Rhône-Alpes
- Department: Lyon Metropolis
- Commune: Lyon

Government
  - Mayor (2020–2026): Fanny Dubot (EELV)
- Area: 9.75 km^{2} (3.76 sq mi)
- Population (2023): 88,326
  - Density: 9,060/km^{2} (23,500/sq mi)
- INSEE code: 69387

| The nine arrondissements of Lyon |

Arrondissements of Lyon

The 7th arrondissement of Lyon (French: 7^{e} arrondissement de Lyon) is one of the nine arrondissements of the City of Lyon.

== Geography ==
=== Squares and streets ===
- Rue de Créqui
- Rue Duguesclin
- Rue Garibaldi
- Rue de l'Université

=== Quarters ===
- La Guillotière (southern part)
- Jean Macé
- Gerland

== Transports ==
This arrondissement is served by metro lines and and tram lines, and.

The 7th arrondissement is also served by the Lyon-Jean Macé railway station.

== Cultural activities ==
- Parc de Gerland
- Stade de Gerland

== See also ==
- Parc Sergent Blandan
- Jewish cemetery, Lyon
