= Cité Internationale =

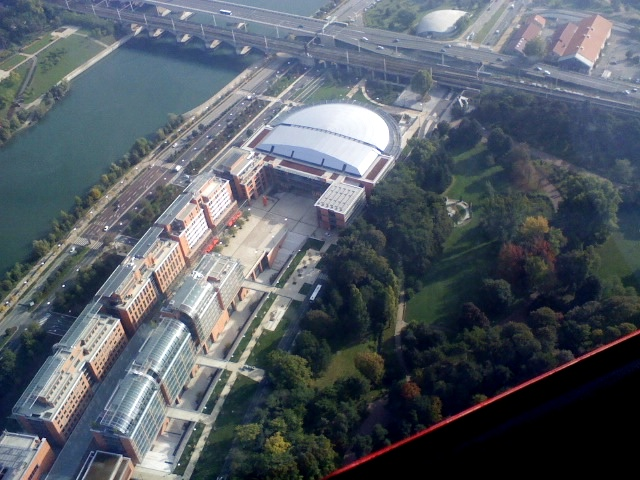
- Aerial view of Cité Internationale
- Interactive map of Cité Internationale
- Coordinates: 45.7849°N 4.8543°E
- Country: France
- Region: Auvergne-Rhône-Alpes
- City: Metropolis of Lyon
- Arrondissement: 6th arrondissement

Population (2007)
  - Total: 900
- Postcode: 69006
- Website: cite-internationale-lyon.fr

Cité Internationale (French pronunciation: [site ɛ̃tɛʁnɑsjɔnal]; "International City") is a quarter in the 6th arrondissement of Lyon, France. It is situated between the Rhône and Parc de la Tête d'Or and encompasses an area that had previously been the location of the Foire de Lyon. It is connected to the commune of Caluire-et-Cuire by the Passerelle de la Paix.

== History ==
In 1984, the Foire de Lyon moved from its previous location near the Rhône to the Eurexpo in Chassieu. This freed land was designated as the site for the construction of the Cité Internationale by successive Lyon mayors (Michel Noir, Raymond Barre, and Gérard Collomb).

In 1985, Lyon mayor Francisque Collomb launched an international competition to design the site, which was won by architect Renzo Piano making him the project manager. The Cité Internationale Société d'économie mixte was established in 1987 and the first construction zone was established in 1988. In 1989 the city decided to demolish the buildings that had housed the Foire de Lyon to make room for the new construction.

In 1992, a second 32-hectare (79-acre) construction site was created. The first construction permits were issued in 1993, and construction began in September of that year. In 1998 the construction plan was modified to allow for the possible development of the future Palais des congrès de Lyon. The same year, the Musée d'art contemporain de Lyon was completed. A Marriott hotel (previously-Hilton) was added in 1999, a casino in 2000, and the first apartments were built in 2001. The construction permits for an extension of the Palais des congrès de Lyon were filed in 2002, and construction started in 2003. Construction concluded in 2006 upon the completion of the Crowne Plaza Hotel and an amphitheatre.
