= Foire de Lyon =

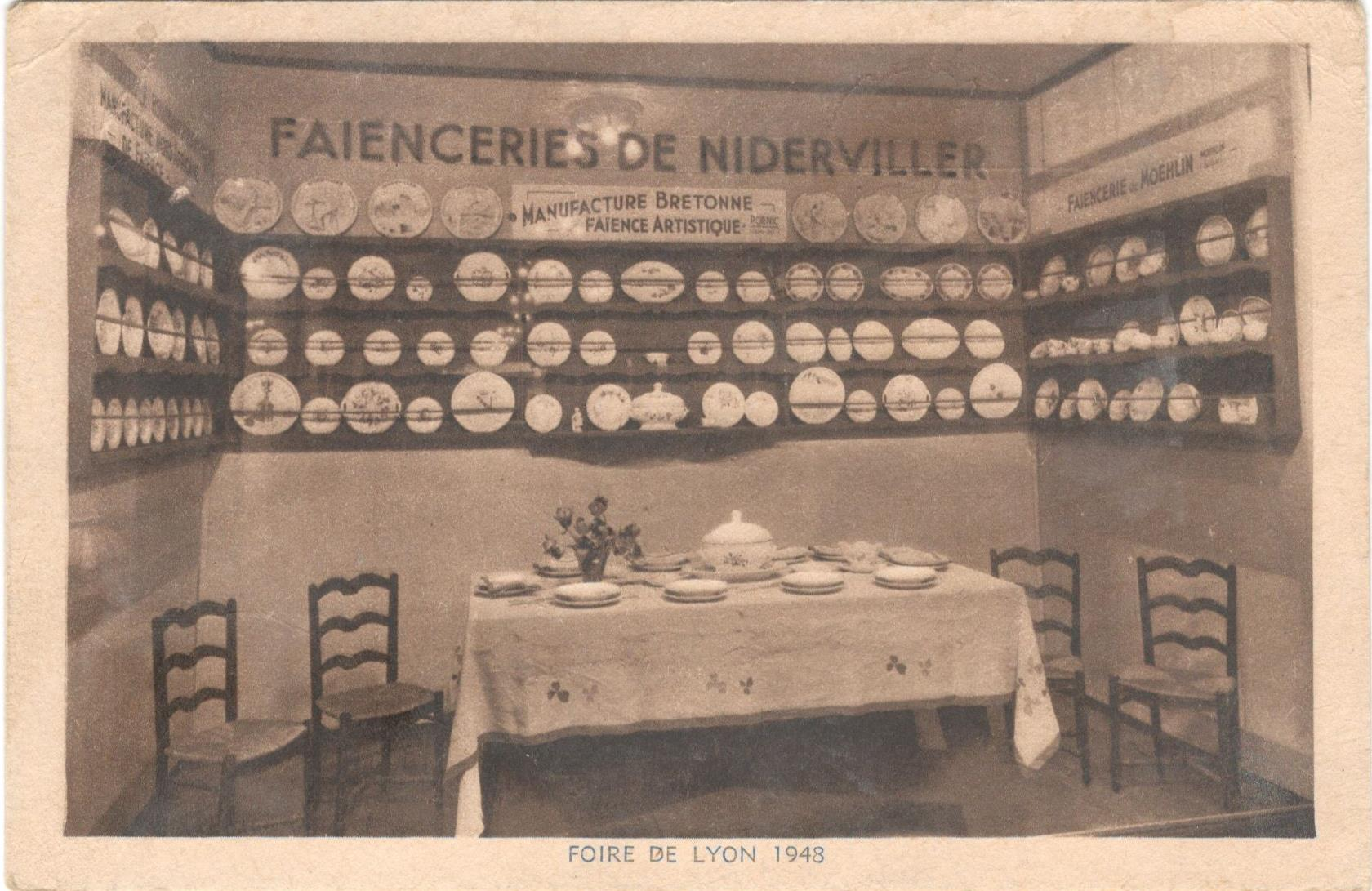
Booth of the Niderviller group at the Lyon Fair, 1948

The Foire de Lyon (Foire internationale de Lyon or Lyon Fair) is a trade fair, traditionally held in March in Lyon, France. Begun as an initiative by Lyon mayor Édouard Herriot in 1916, the fair has been held in the Eurexpo convention center in Chassieu since 1985.

== History ==
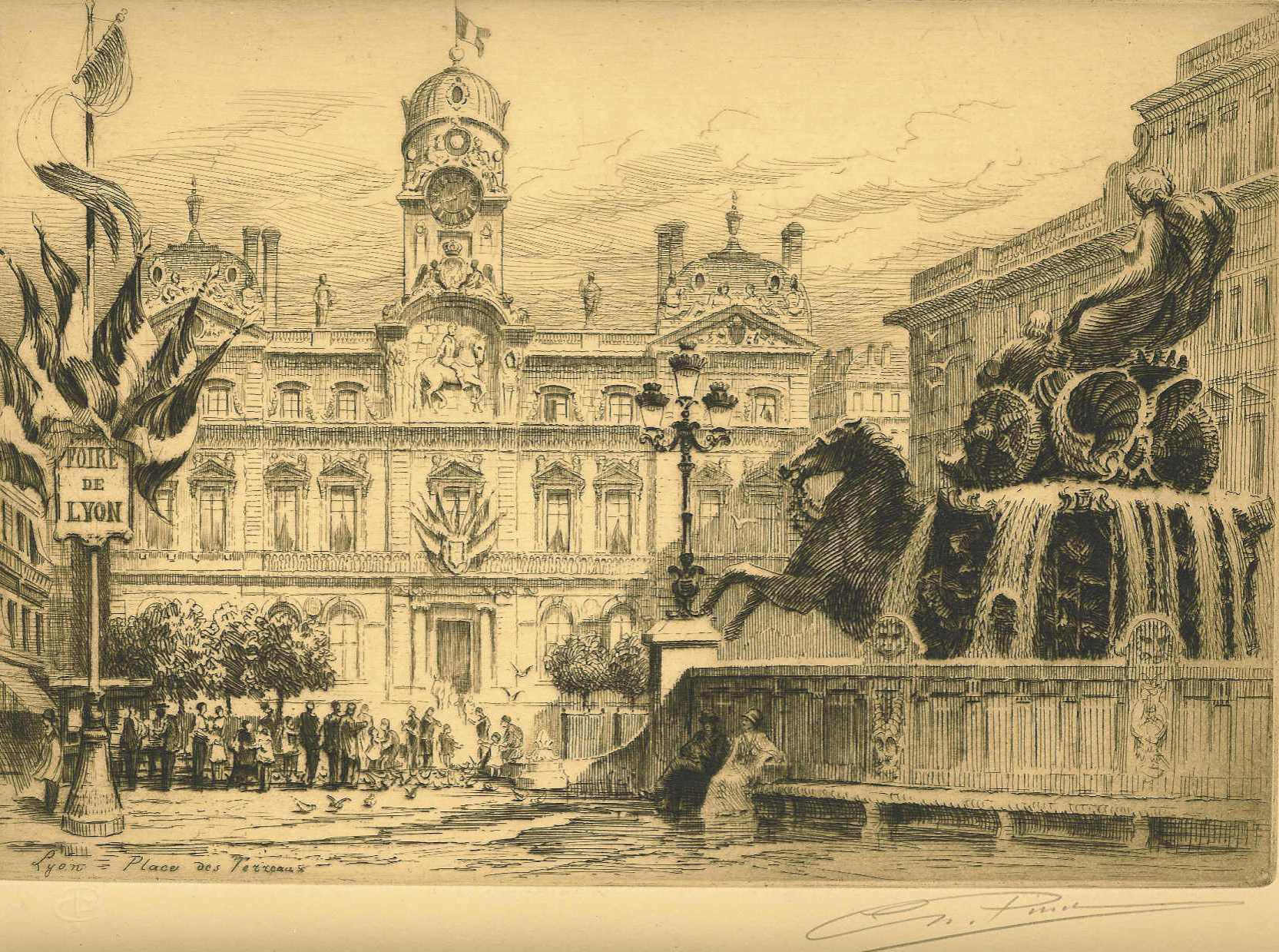
Engraving of Place des Terreaux decorated to celebrate the Foire de Lyon, by Charles Pinet

The creation of the Foire de Lyon began in 1916 through an initiative by then mayor Édouard Herriot. He decided to build a vast "Palace" to accommodate the commercial stalls that were crowding the quays and streets, and impeding traffic flow in the area. The Fair Palace was built from 1918 to 1938 on land located between the Rhône and Parc de la Tête d'Or. Subsequent construction did not adhere to the original plan. The buildings of the Fair Palace were ultimately destroyed to make room for the Cité Internationale, leaving only the main façade of the central pavilion, now integrated into the Musée d'art contemporain de Lyon. In 1985 the fair was moved to the Eurexpo convention center in the commune of Chassieu, east of the Metropolis of Lyon.

== Themes ==
Each edition of the fair, starting from 2006, is devoted to a particular theme.

- 2006 – The People of Tibet, with Maurice Herzog as sponsor
- 2007 – Indonesia
- 2008 – India
- 2009 – Cinema, with Clovis Cornillac as sponsor
- 2010 – Japanese culture
- 2011 – Outer space and science fiction
- 2012 – Native Americans, with sponsor Harlyn Geronimo, great grandson of Geronimo
- 2013 – New York – New York! Exposition on New York City, with Douglas Kennedy as sponsor
- 2014 – Rock Story, an exposition on the history of rock, with Philippe Manœuvre as artistic advisor and sponsor
- 2015 – Les objets connectés (Connected Objects)
- 2016 – La foire de Lyon fête ses 100 ans ! (The Lyon Fair Celebrates 100 Years!)
- 2017 – Viva Cuba
- 2018 – London Edition
- 2019 – San Francisco

== See also ==
- Foire de Paris
