= Découverte du Sushi =

Pan-European sushi-making competition

Découverte du Sushi (English: "Discovery of Sushi") is a Pan-European sushi making competition, part of the biennial Sirha (Salon International de la Restauration, de l’Hôtellerie et de l’Alimentation) 'world hospitality and food service event' trade show held in January at Eurexpo in Lyon, France.

The competition was first held in 2003 and usually accepts representatives from about twelve countries. To be eligible for the contest, entrants must be studying in a European hospitality school, be under the age of 22 years on the day of the competition, and not be of Japanese nationality.

Découverte du Sushi comprises three stages, judged by a jury of professionals:

1. Nigiri Express Speed: prepare, under a time limit, a maximum amount of nigiri
2. Sushi Nippon Technicality: prepare a plate of traditional nigiri and maki
3. European Roll Creativity: invent an original recipe of maki (roll) with ingredients from the entrant's home country

Winning schools are:

- 2003: École Supérieure de Cuisine Française Ferrandi (Paris, France)
- 2005: Lycée Hôtelier Paul Augier (Nice, France)
- 2007: Szkola Policealna nr13（Warsaw, Poland）
- 2009: Lycée des Métiers de l'Hôtellerie et du Tourisme de Grenoble (France) The 2009 competition awarded podium places to France, Germany and Belgium.
