= List of Olympic venues in short-track speed skating =

For the Winter Olympics, there are nine venues that have been used for short track speed skating. The 1988 events were held at the same venue with the curling events though both were demonstration events. Since then, the short track speed skating events have been held with the figure skating events.

Games	Venue	Other sports hosted at venue for those games	Capacity	Ref.
1988 Calgary	Max Bell Arena (demonstration)	Curling (demonstration)	3,200	
1992 Albertville	La halle de glace Olympique	Figure skating	9,000	
1994 Lillehammer	Hamar Olympic Amphitheatre	Figure skating	6,000	
1998 Nagano	White Ring	Figure skating	7,351	
2002 Salt Lake City	Salt Lake Ice Center	Figure skating	17,500	
2006 Turin	Palavela	Figure skating	8,000	
2010 Vancouver	Pacific Coliseum	Figure skating	14,239	
2014 Sochi	Iceberg Skating Palace	Figure skating	12,000	
2018 PyeongChang	Gangneung Ice Arena	Figure skating	12,000	
2022 Beijing	Capital Indoor Stadium	Figure skating	15,000	
2026 Milano - Cortina d'Ampezzo	Mediolanum Forum	Figure skating	15,800	
2030 French Alps	Eurexpo	Figure skating, Curling	TBD	
2034 Salt Lake City-Utah	Maverik Center	Figure skating	10,100	

== Gallery of venues ==
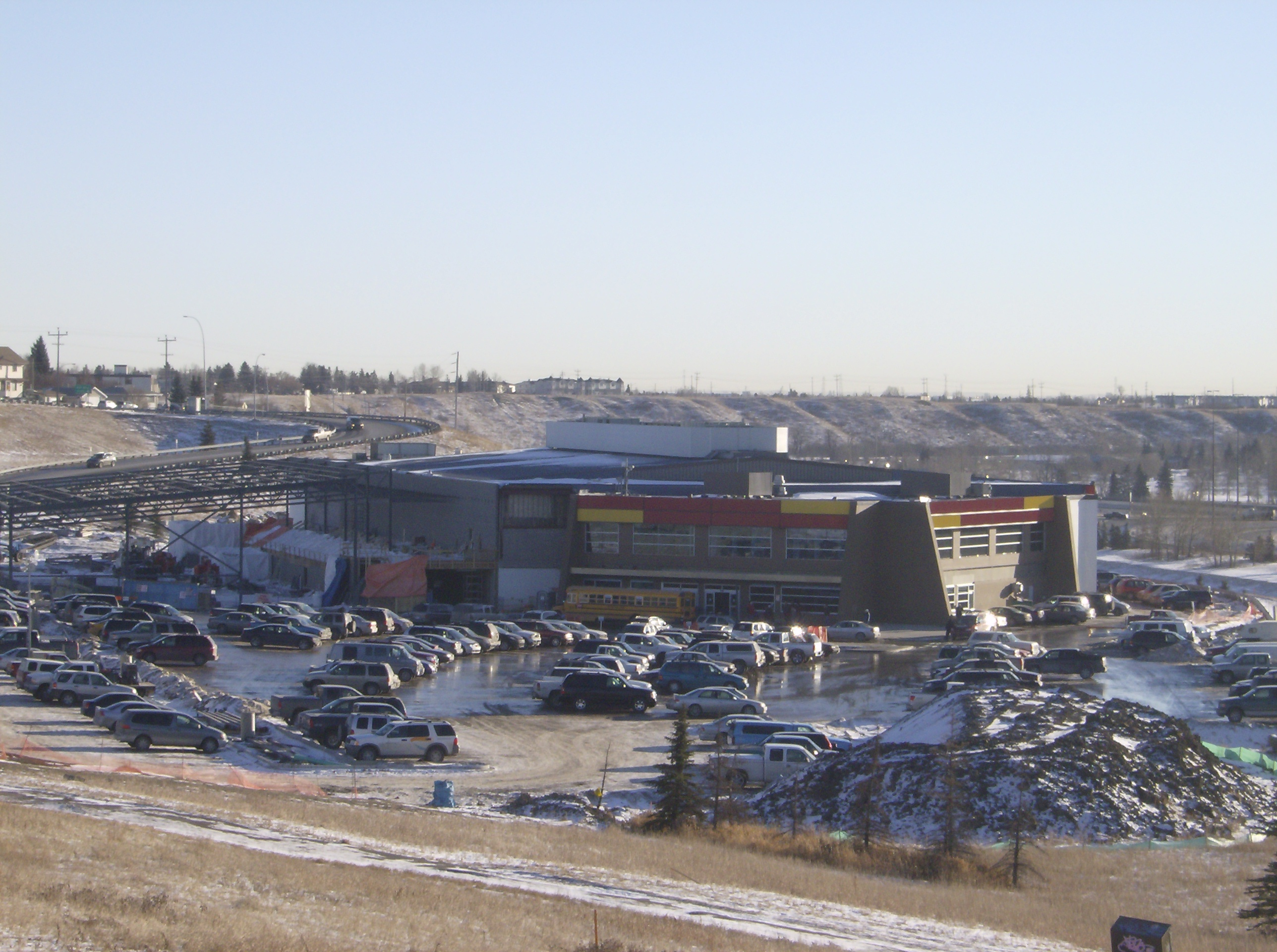
The Max Bell Centre hosted short-track speed skating as a demonstration sport at the 1988 Winter Olympics in Calgary.

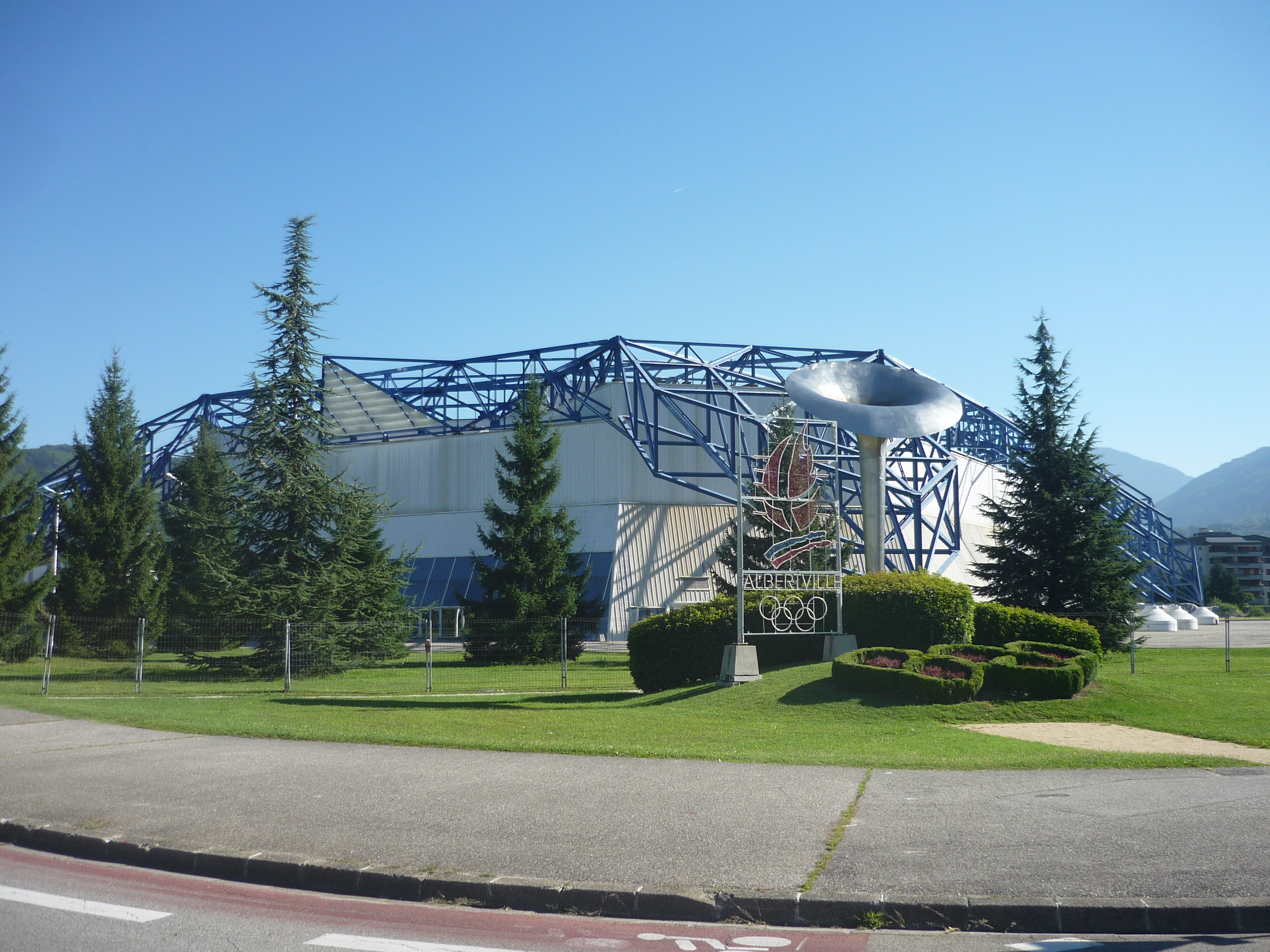
La halle de glace Olympique hosted short-track speed skating at the 1992 Winter Olympics in Albertville.

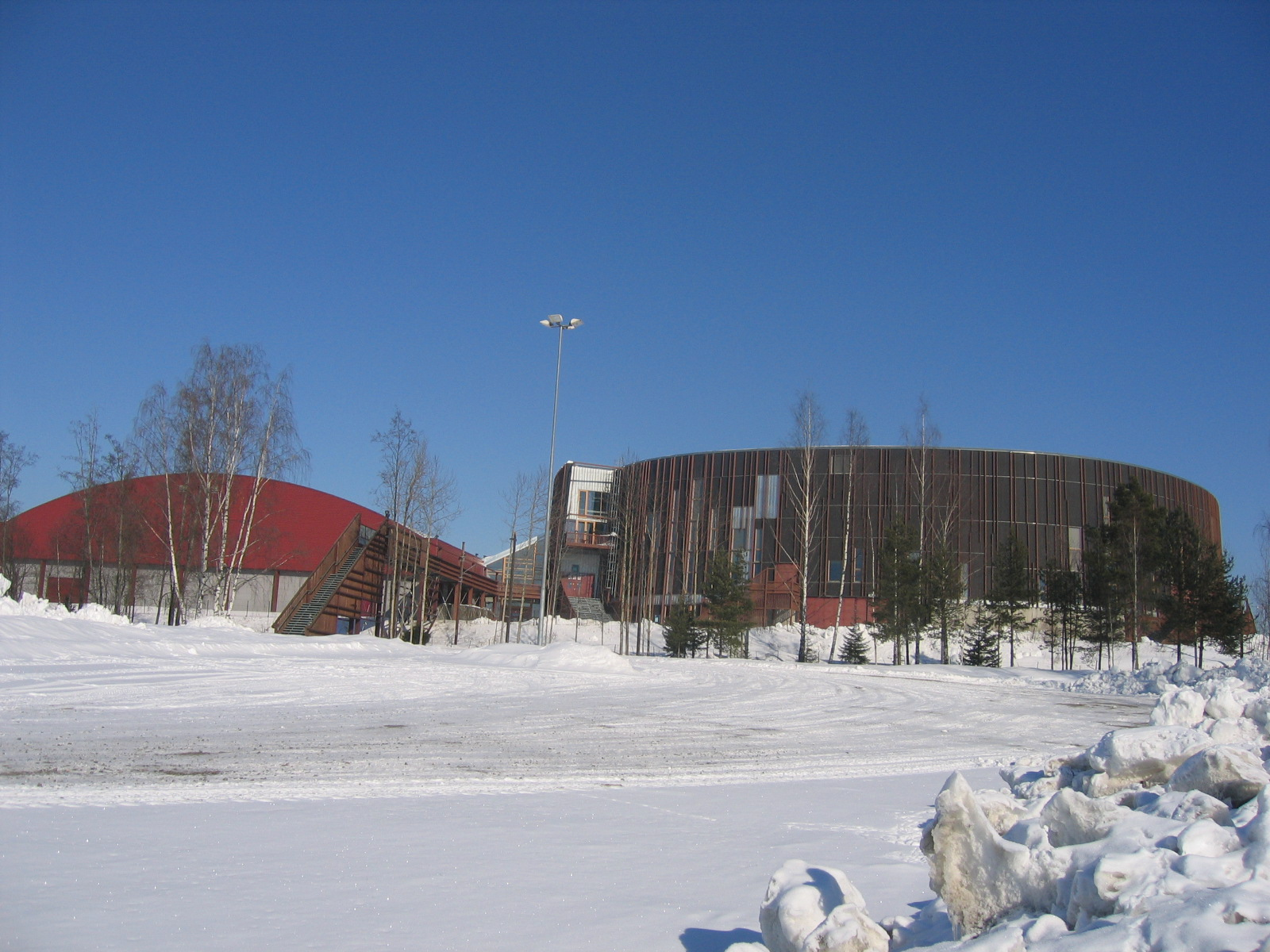
Hamar Olympic Amphitheatre hosted short-track speed skating at the 1994 Winter Olympics in Lillehammer.

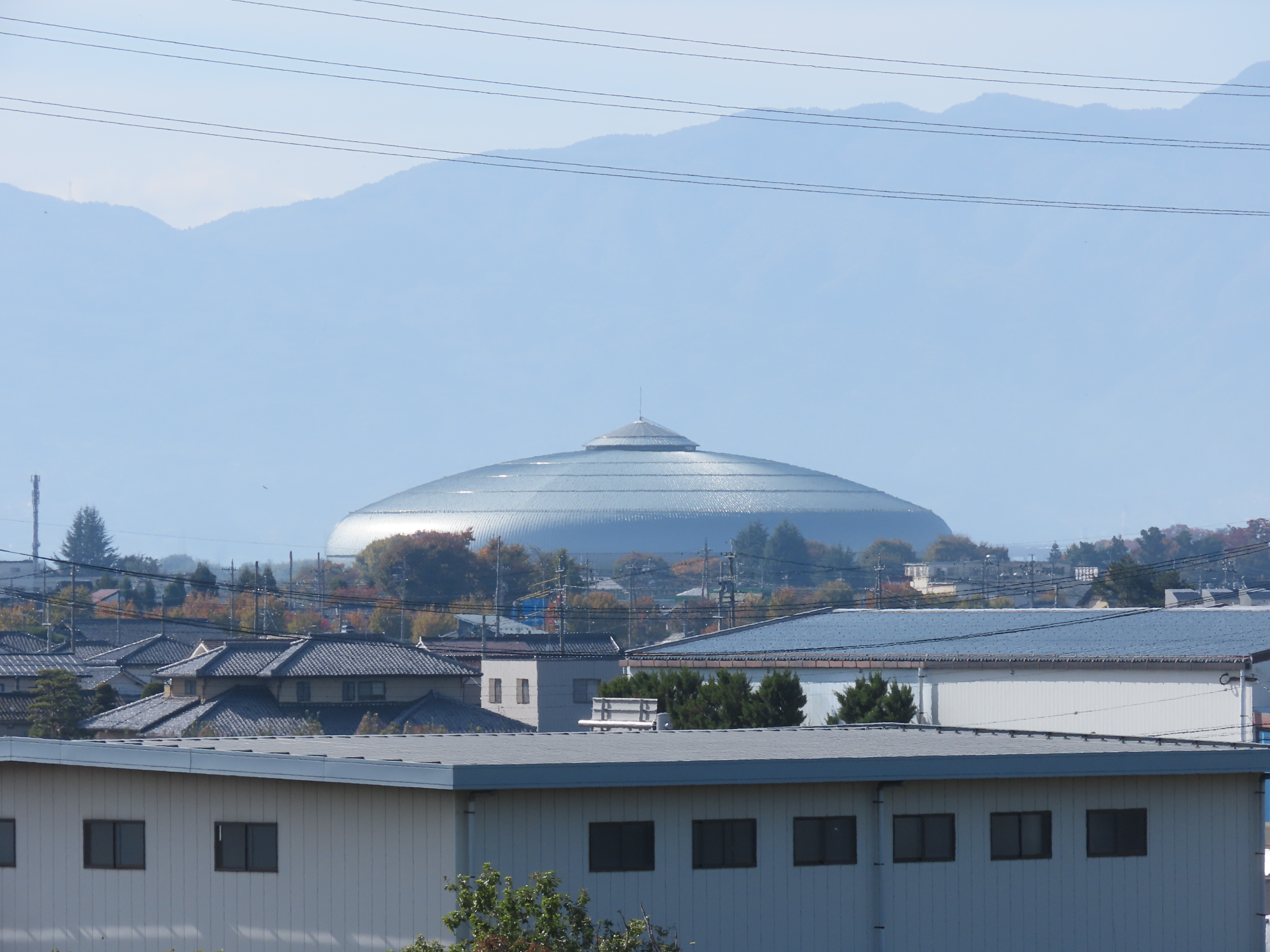
White Ring hosted short-track speed skating at the 1998 Winter Olympics in Nagano.

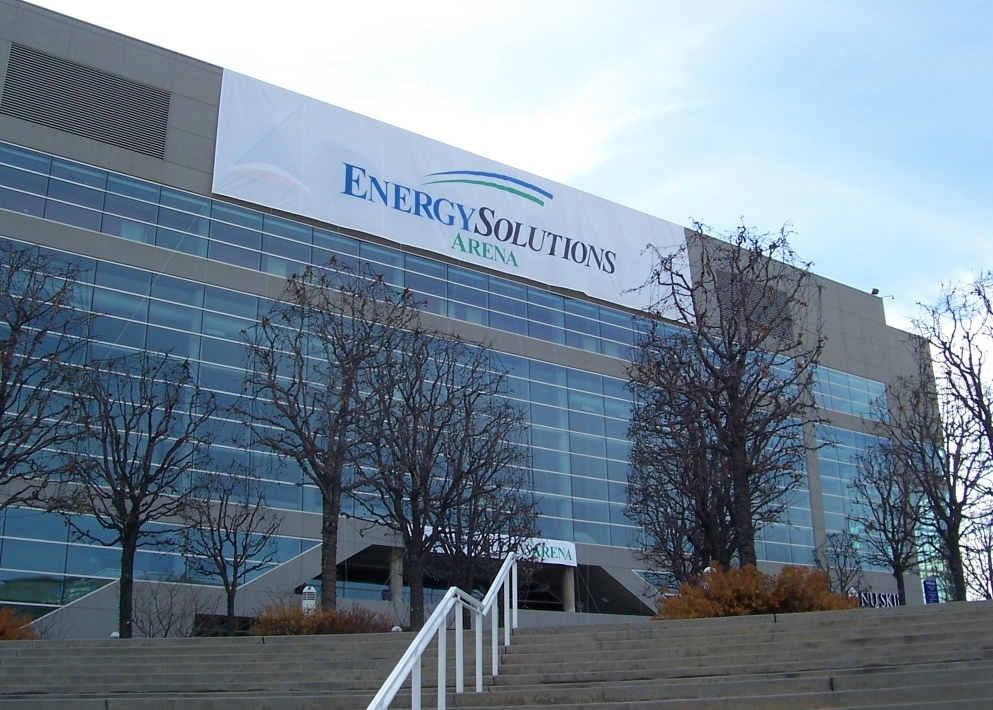
Delta Center hosted short-track speed skating at the 2002 Winter Olympics in Salt Lake City.

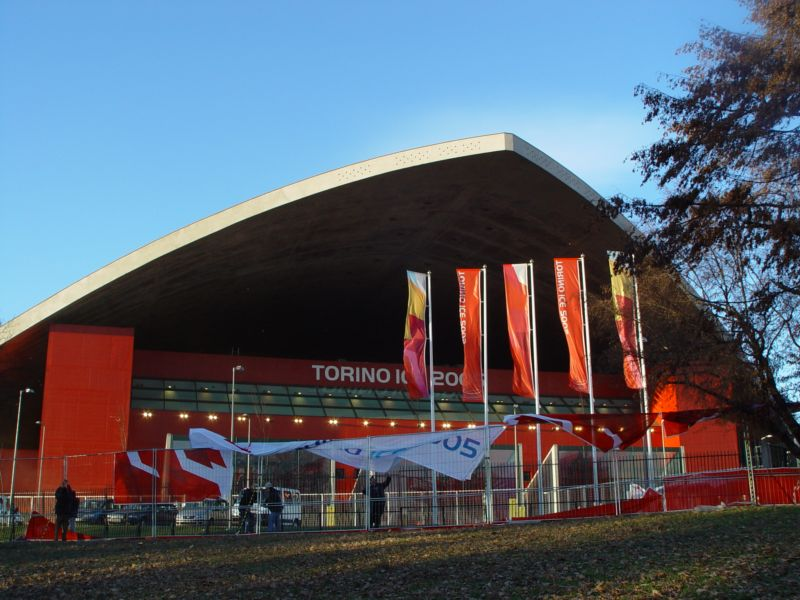
Torino Palavela hosted short-track speed skating at the 2006 Winter Olympics in Turin.

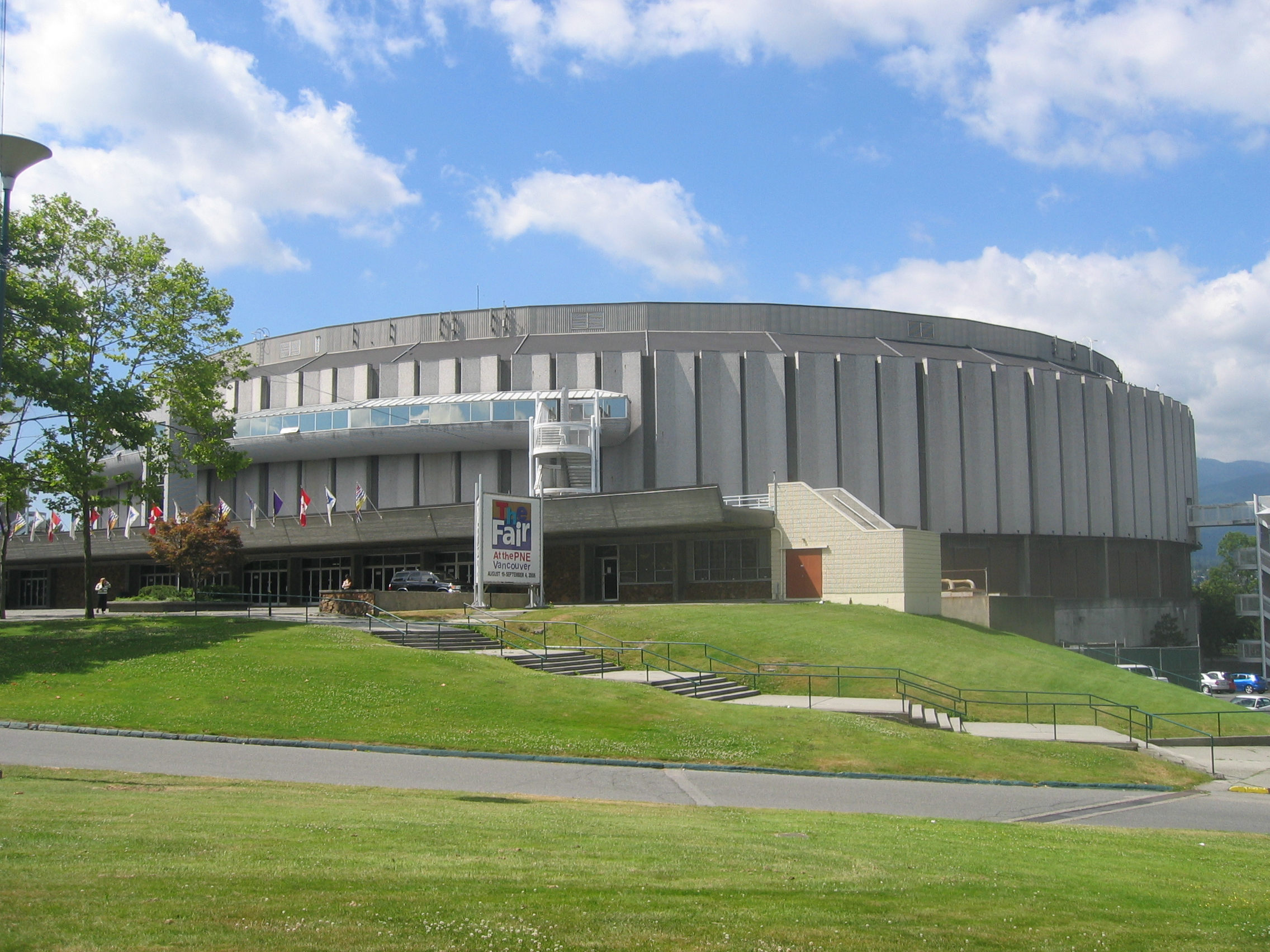
Pacific Coliseum hosted short-track speed skating at the 2010 Winter Olympics in Vancouver.

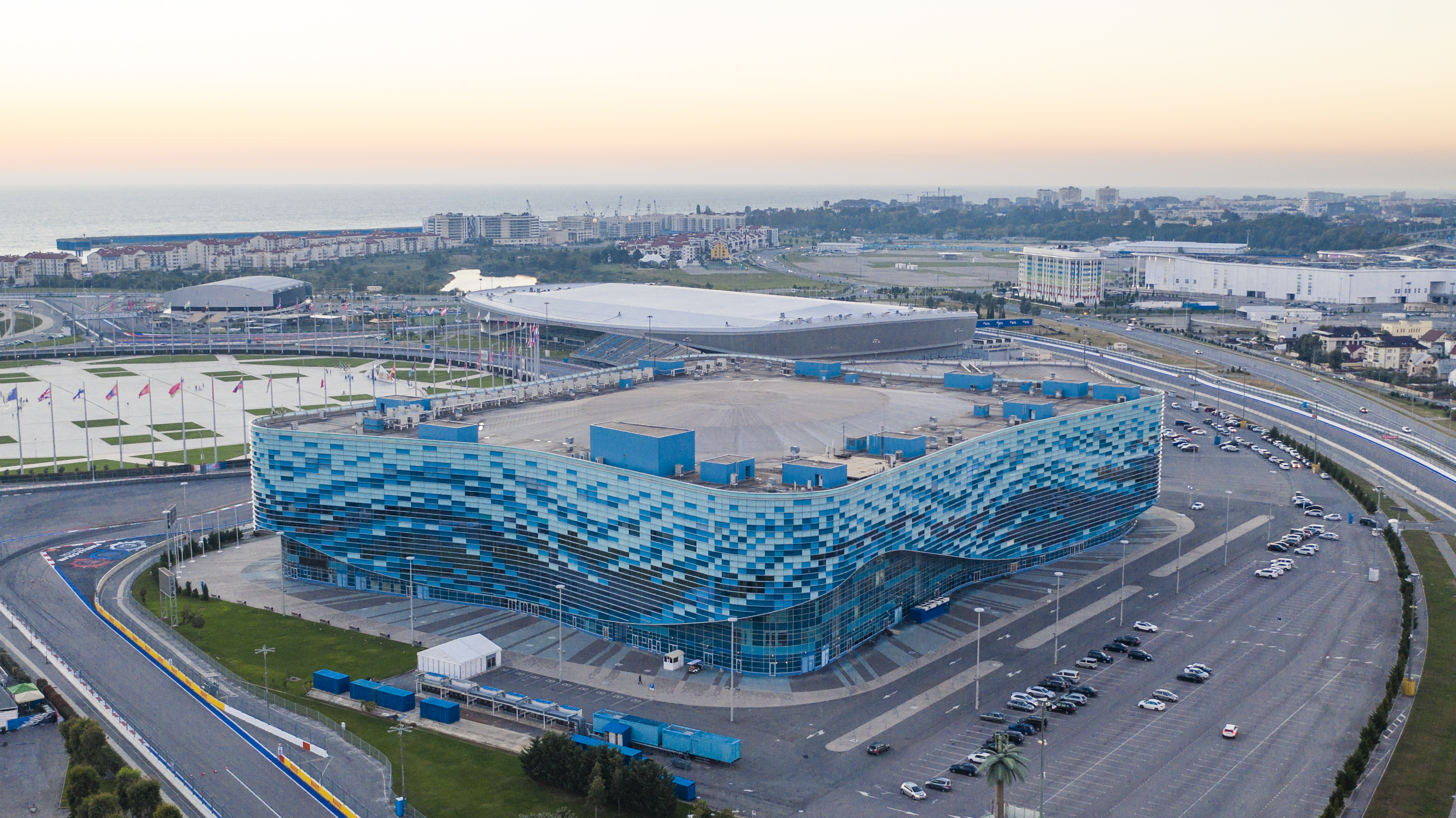
The Iceberg Skating Palace hosted short-track speed skating at the 2014 Winter Olympics in Sochi.

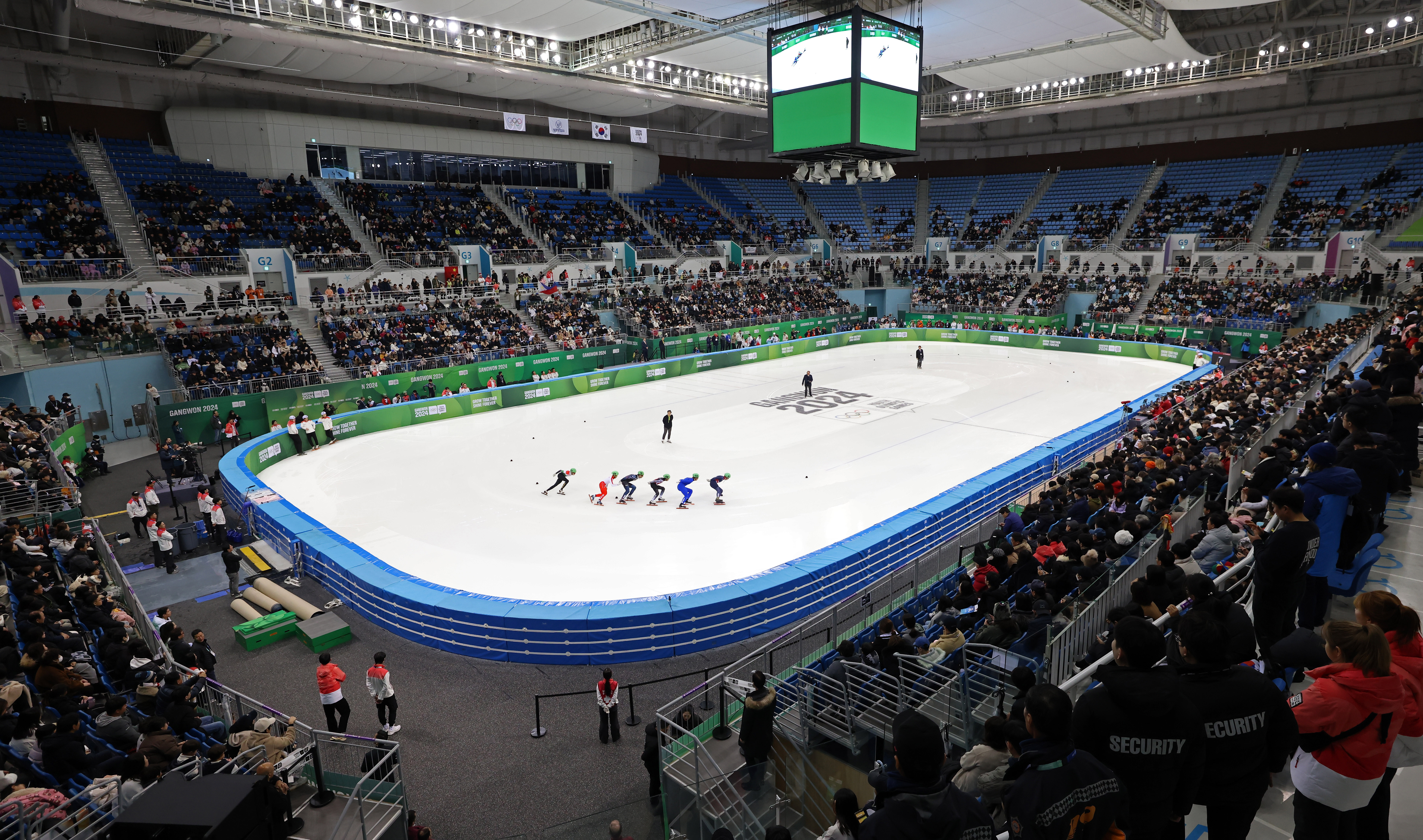
Gangneung Ice Arena hosted short-track speed skating at the 2018 Winter Olympics in Pyeongchang.

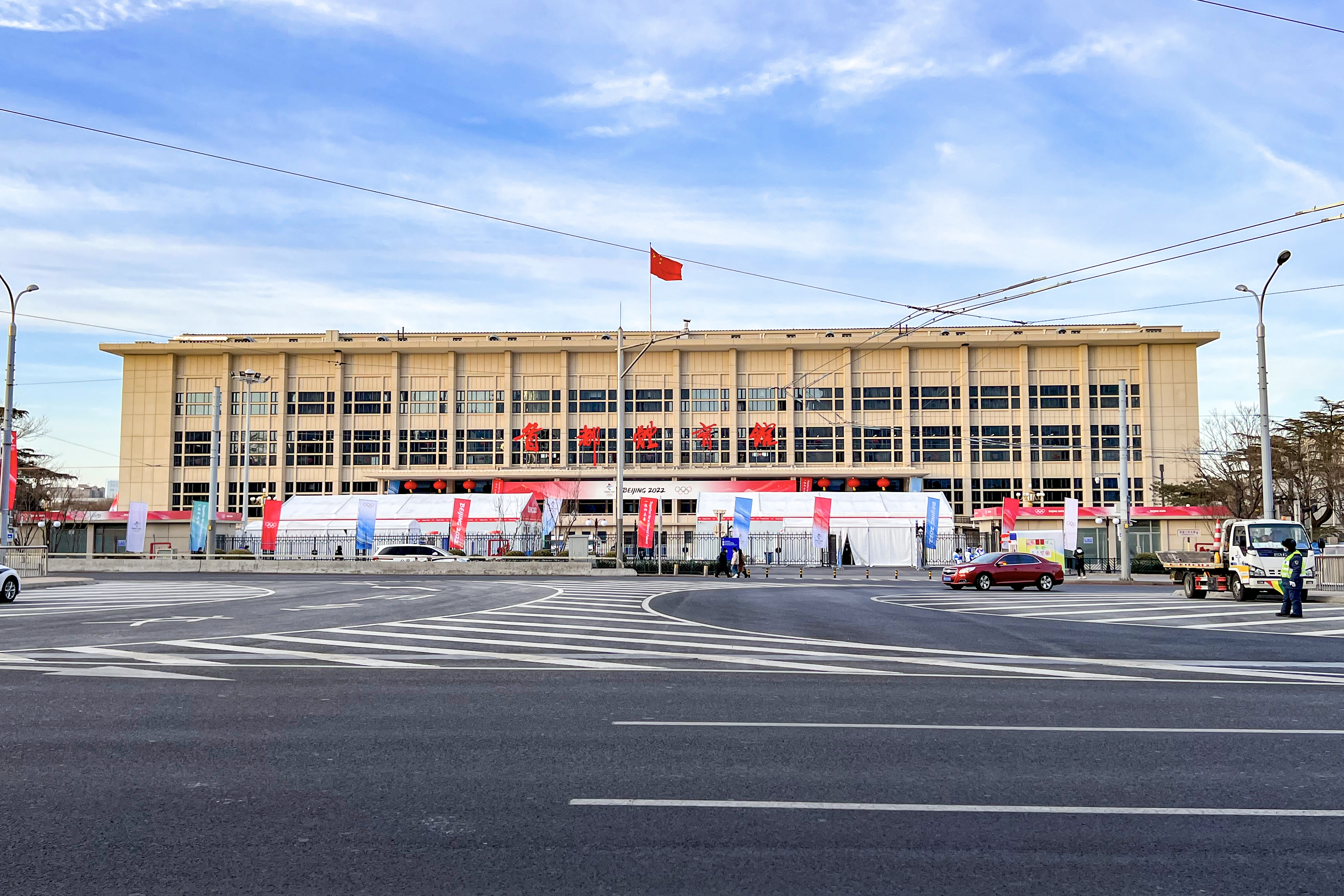
Capital Indoor Stadium hosted short-track speed skating at the 2022 Winter Olympics in Beijing.

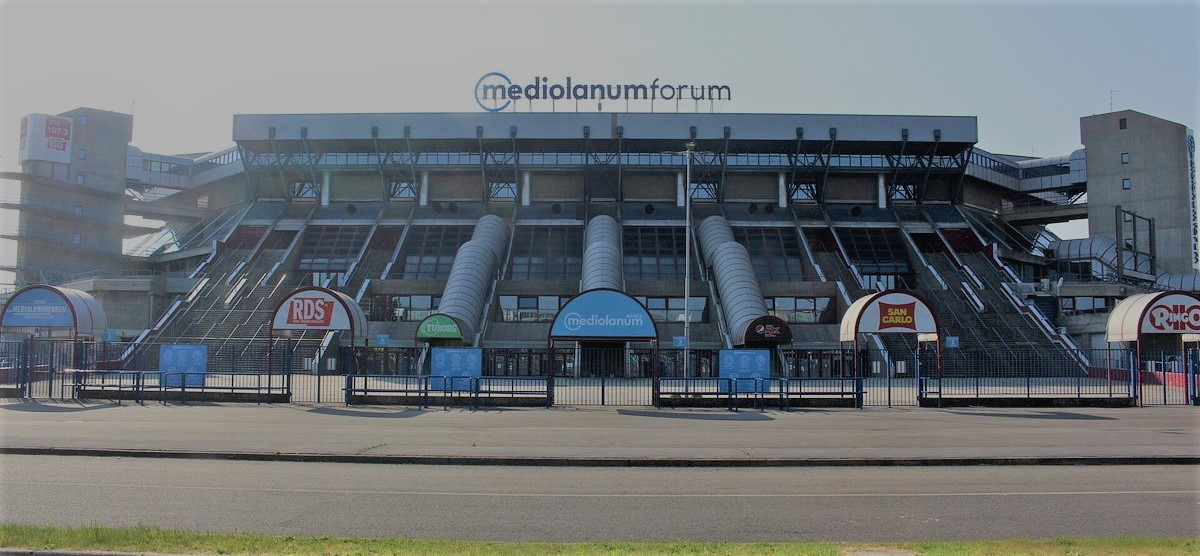
The Unipol Forum hosted short-track speed skating at the 2026 Winter Olympics in Milan.

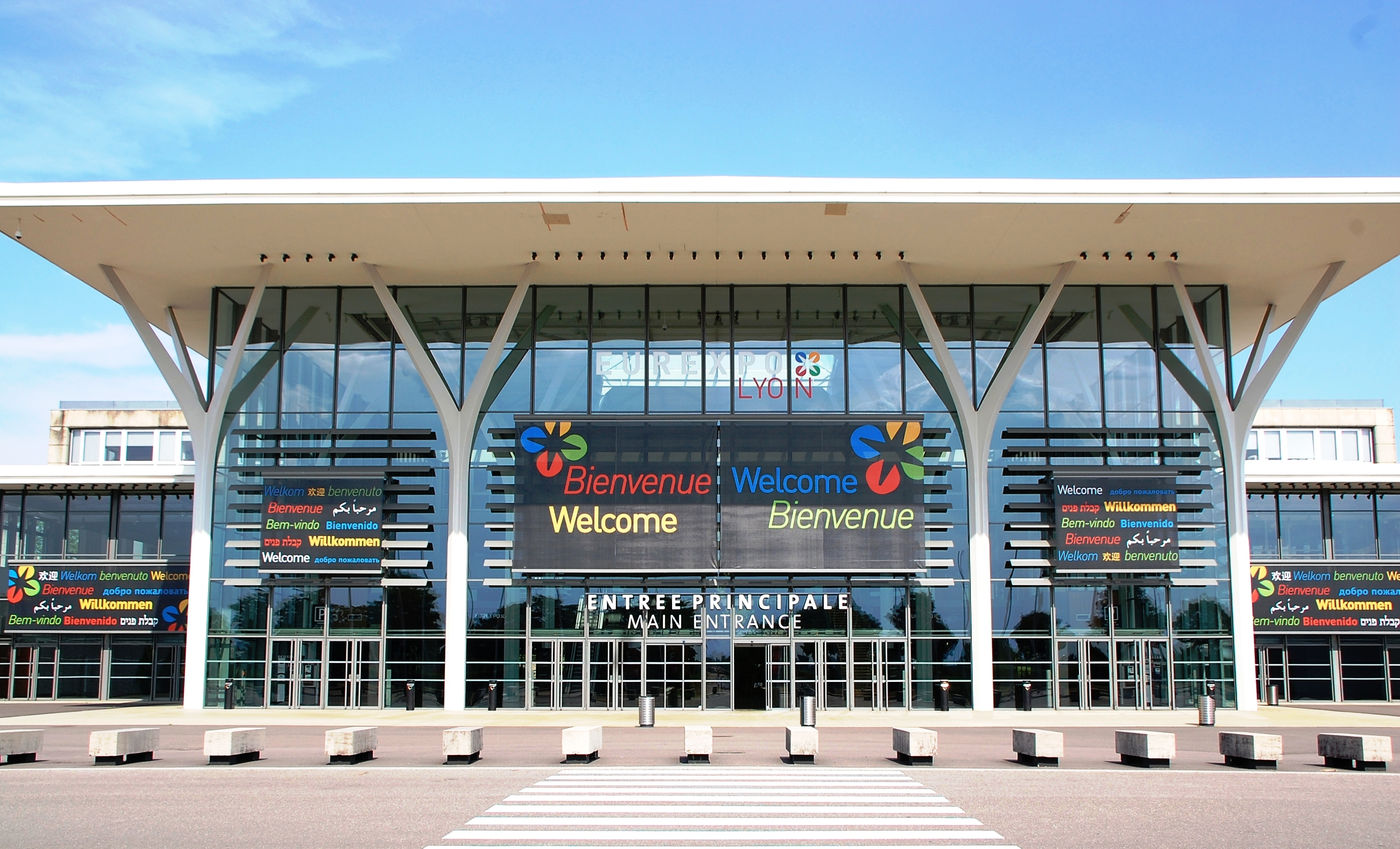
Eurexpo in Lyon will host short-track speed skating for the 2030 Winter Olympics in the French Alps.

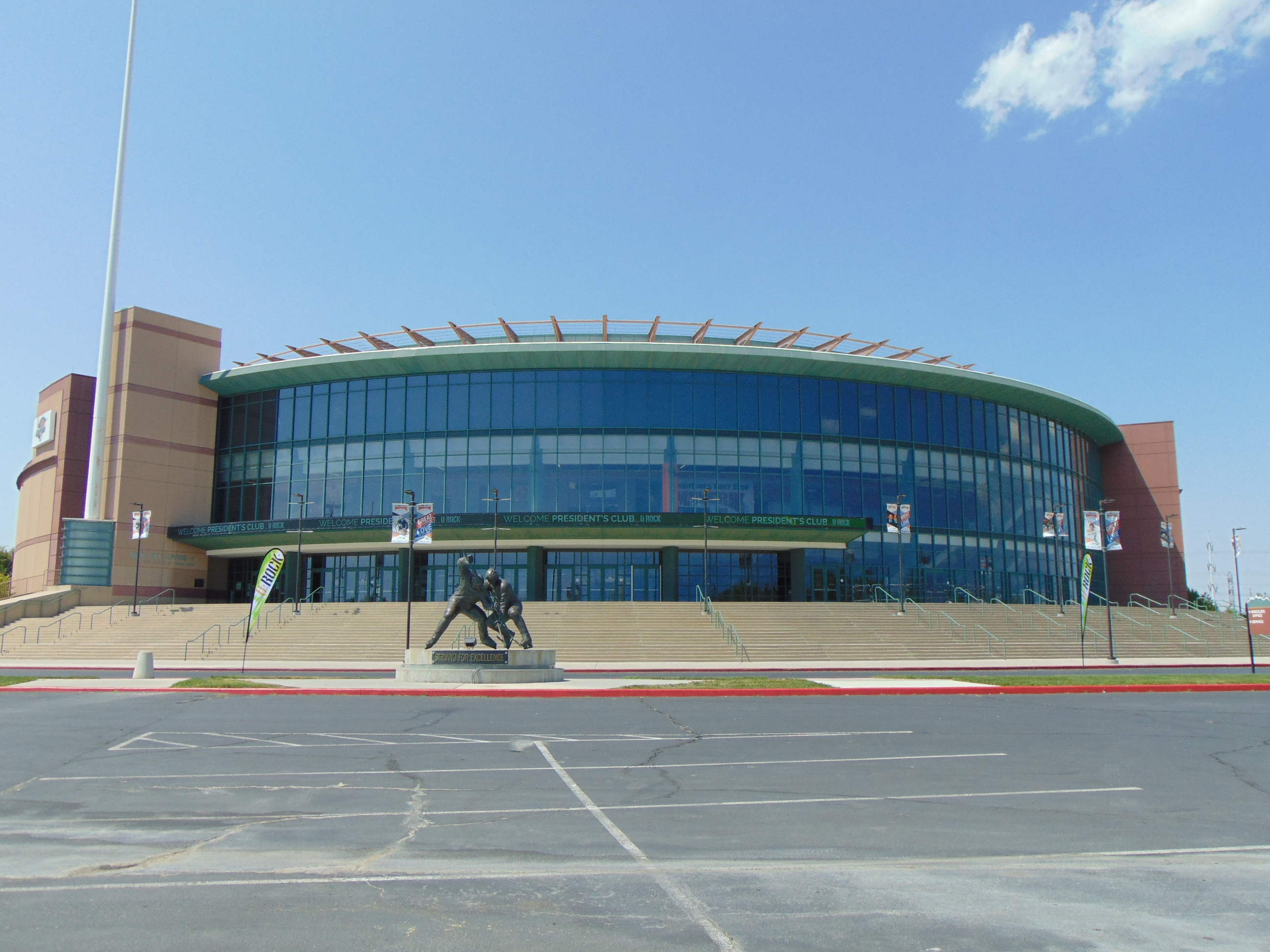
The Maverick Center will host short-track speed skating at the 2034 Winter Olympics in Utah.
