= Dietmar Feichtinger =

Austrian architect

Dietmar Feichtinger (born 18 November 1961 in Bruck an der Mur) is an Austrian architect established since 1989 in Paris.

== Biography ==
After graduating in 1988 from the Technical University of Graz with honors, he moved to Paris in 1989 where he founded the studio Dietmar Feichtinger Architectes in 1994. Today, the firm has 35 employees. A wide range of buildings have been built by the company in Europe including schools, pools, office buildings and housing.

In 1998, he won the competition for the Passerelle Simone-de-Beauvoir over the Seine, facing the Bibliothèque Nationale de France. Inaugurated by Bertrand Delanoë on 13 July 2006, the bridge has a total length of 304 meters and a clear span of 190 meters and is the first of the 37 Parisian bridges to carry the name of a female personality.

In 2002, Feichtinger won the competition for the new access bridge to Mont Saint-Michel, a monument classified world heritage by UNESCO, with a total length of 1841 meters. The bridge opened to pedestrians in July 2014 and shuttles in December 2014. During high tides the Mount becomes an island again thanks to the global restoring operation of its maritime character that began in 1995 and is provided by the Syndicat Mixte Baie du Mont-Saint Michel. In 2014, Dietmar Feichtinger was elected permanent member of the Academy of Arts Berlin. Even though he claims not to be a 'bridge specialist', he is the architect of 13 bridges and footbridges built in Europe including the Three Country Bridge between France and Germany over the Rhine and the Passerelle de la Paix in Lyon that opened to the public in March 2014.

Currently, the studio works on the Centre for Research in Neuroscience on the Saclay Nuclear Research Centre campus as part of the Paris-Saclay operation, one of the main projects of the Grand Paris, development project for the whole of the Paris metropolitan area. One of Dietmar Feichtinger's recent works is the walkway Aldilonda on the coastline of Bastia, Corsica.

== Selection of completed projects ==
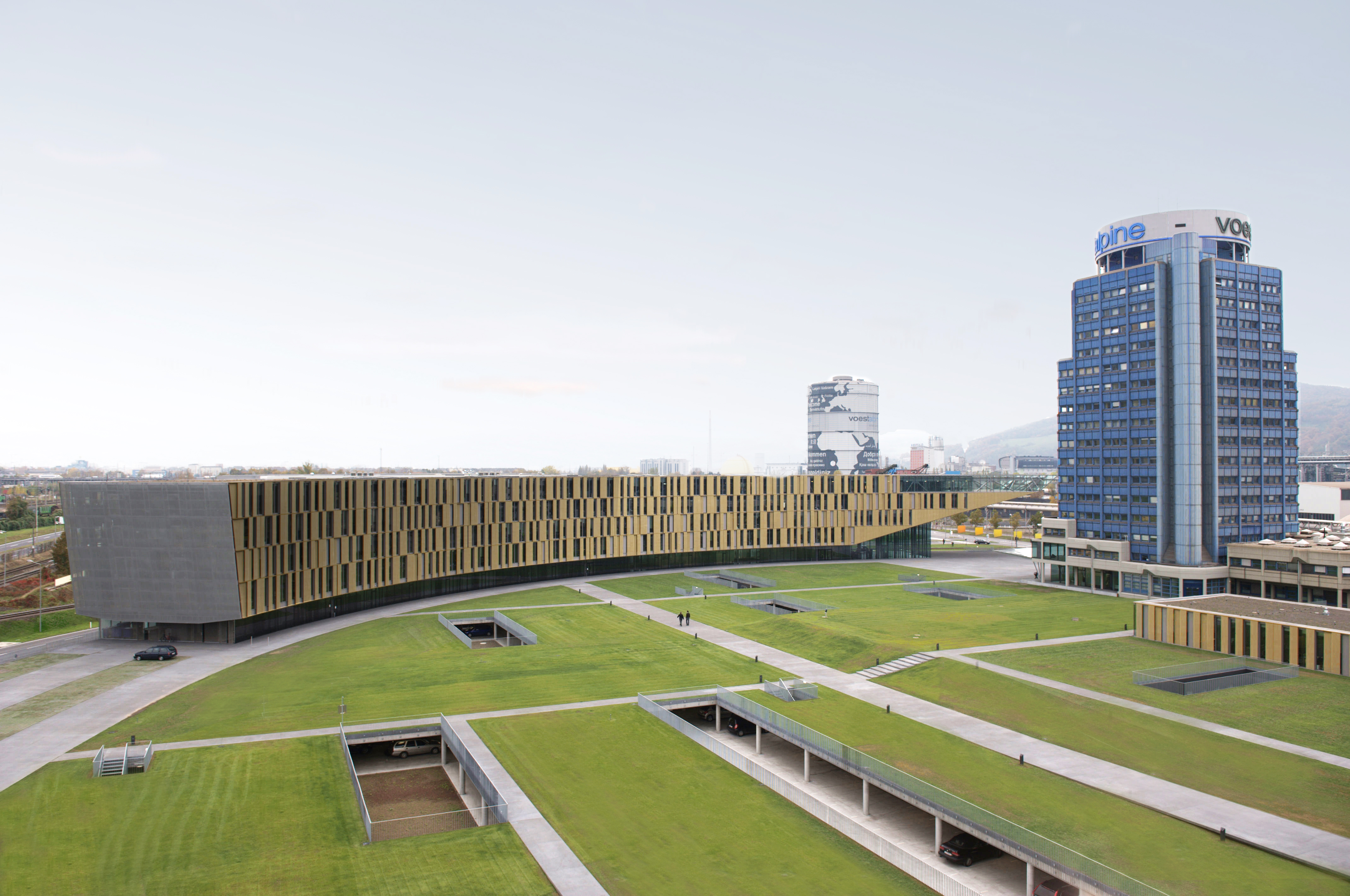
Financial center Voestalpine in Linz, Austria

- Aldilonda Promenade over the sea, Citadelle of Bastia, Corsica, Belgium, completed 2020
- Extension of the Ostend train station, Belgium, completed 2019
- Security and Transparency: Fencing the Eiffel Tower, Paris, France, completed 2018
- Headquarter Veolia Environment, Paris, France, completed 2016
- Headquarter Lille Métropole Habitat, Tourcoing, France, completed 2015
- Sportcenter Jules Ladoumègue, Paris, France, completed 2014
- Peace footbridge over the Rhone, Lyon, France, completed 2014
- Sport Center Hector Berlioz, Vincennes, France, completed 2013
- University of Provence, Aix-en-Provence, France, completed 2013
- School group Albert Camus, Coulaines, France, completed 2013
- School group Lucie Aubrac, Nanterre, France, completed 2012
- New City Center, commercial center, kindergarten and multiplex cinema, Montreuil-sous-Bois, France, completed 2012
- Footbridge Oude Dokken, Ghent, Belgium, completed 2012
- 77 housing units Eurgoate, 0 Energy, Vienne, Austria, completed 2012
- 70 housing units and kindergarten Lehen, Salzburg, Austria, completed 2012
- 93 housing units and retail space, Paris, France, completed 2012
- Moveable and fix footbridge, Willebroek, Belgium, completed 2012
- County Hospital of Carinthy, Klagenfurt, Austria, completed 2009
- Office Voestalpine, Linz, Austria, completed 2009
- Bilger-Breustedt School Group, Taufkirchen, Austria, completed 2009
- Three Footbridges – BRAQUE, CHAGALL, MIRO, Strasbourg, France, completed 2008
- Footbridge Valmy, Paris, La Défense, France, completed 2007
- Museum Footbridge, Hamburg, Germany, completed 2007
- Footbridge Simone de Beauvoir, Paris, France, completed 2006
- Shanghai Bridge, Hamburg, Germany, completed 2006
- Three-country Footbridge, Weil-am-Rhein, Germany | Huningue, France, completed 2006
- University Campus, Krems, Austria, completed 2005
- Cultural Center, Weiz, Austria, completed 2005
- Logistic center A1, Gennevilliers, France, completed 2005

== Bibliography ==
- Feichtinger Architectes "Passerelle Simone-de-Beauvoir Paris", AAM Editions, Brüssel 2007, ISBN 978-2-87143-175-6
