= Passerelle de la Paix =

Bridge over the Rhône in Lyon, France

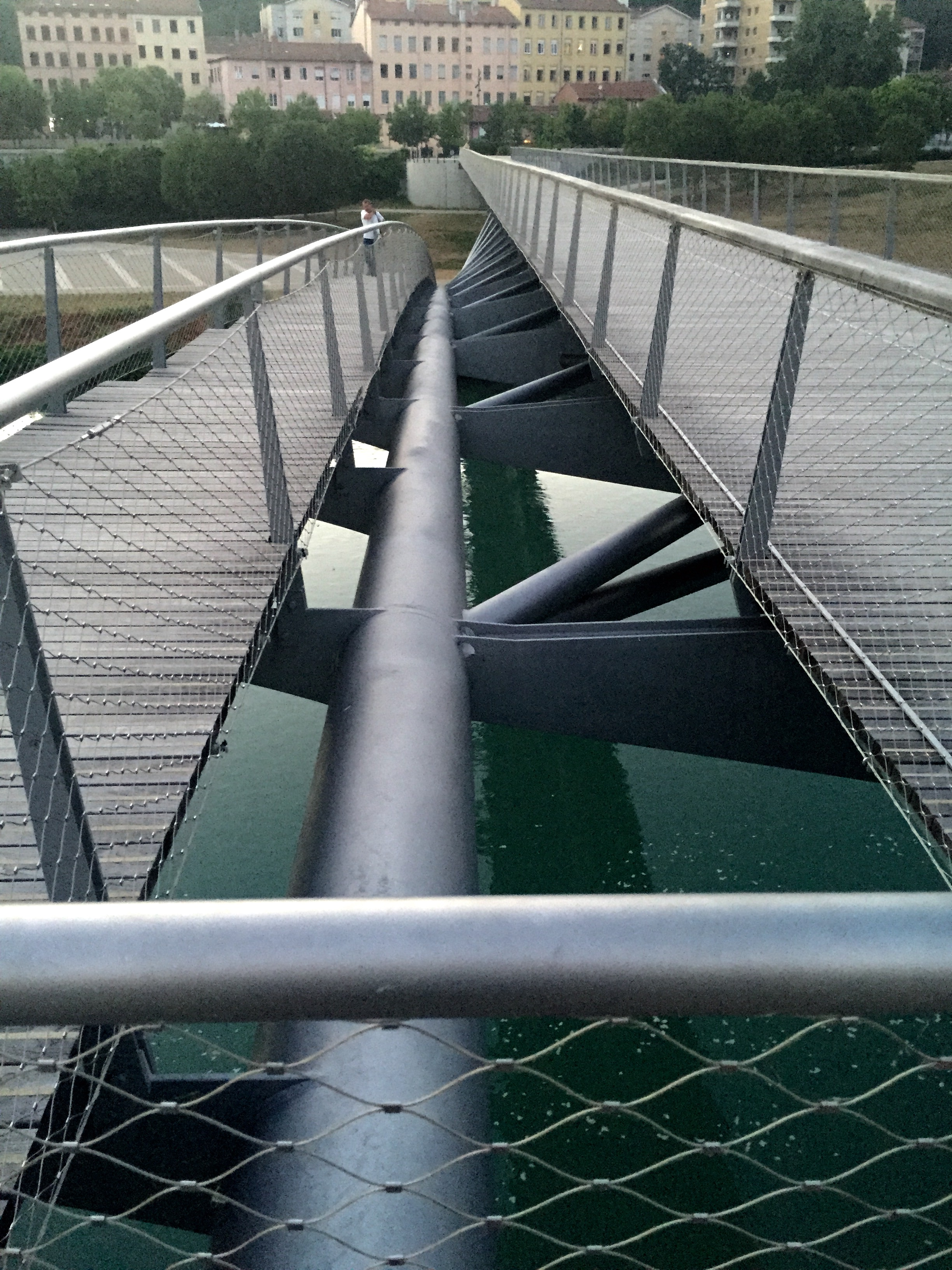
- View from the Passerelle de la Paix
- Coordinates: 45.7868823°N 4.8542305°E
- Carries: Pedestrians and bicycles
- Crosses: Rhône
- Locale: Lyon & Caluire-et-Cuire, Rhône-Alpes, France

Characteristics
- Material: Steel
- Total length: 217 metres (712 ft)
- Width: 8.5 metres (28 ft)

History
- Architect: Dietmar Feichtinger
- Engineering design by: SBP
- Construction start: 29 November 2011
- Construction cost: €15.7
- Opened: March 17, 2014

Location
- Interactive map of Passerelle de la Paix

The Passerelle de la Paix (French pronunciation: [pasʁɛl də la pɛ], "skyway of peace") is a pedestrian and bicycle bridge over the Rhône river in Lyon, France. It connects the 6th arrondissement of Lyon and the commune of Caluire-et-Cuire.

Grand Lyon commissioned the construction of a bridge between Cité Internationale and Place Basse Demonchy in Parc Saint-Clair in Caluire-et-Cuire. The project was first conceived in 1994, but construction was held up by a legal dispute over who would be the primary contractor. The project was revived in 2009 with Austrian architect Dietmar Feichtinger creating the design for the bridge. The construction of the bridge began in March 2012. The bridge was named "Passerelle de la Paix" on 22 October 2012 to represent intercultural harmony, because the neighbourhood of Saint-Clair has a large immigrant population. Construction concluded on 13 December 2013 and opened to the public on 17 March 2014. The bridge has two sections: a 217-metre (712-foot) long upper section for pedestrians and bicycles, and a 156-metre (512-foot) long lower section uniquely for pedestrians.

== See also ==
- Bridges of Lyon
