= Three Countries Bridge =

Three Countries Bridge: Dreiländerbrücke; Passerelle des Trois Pays
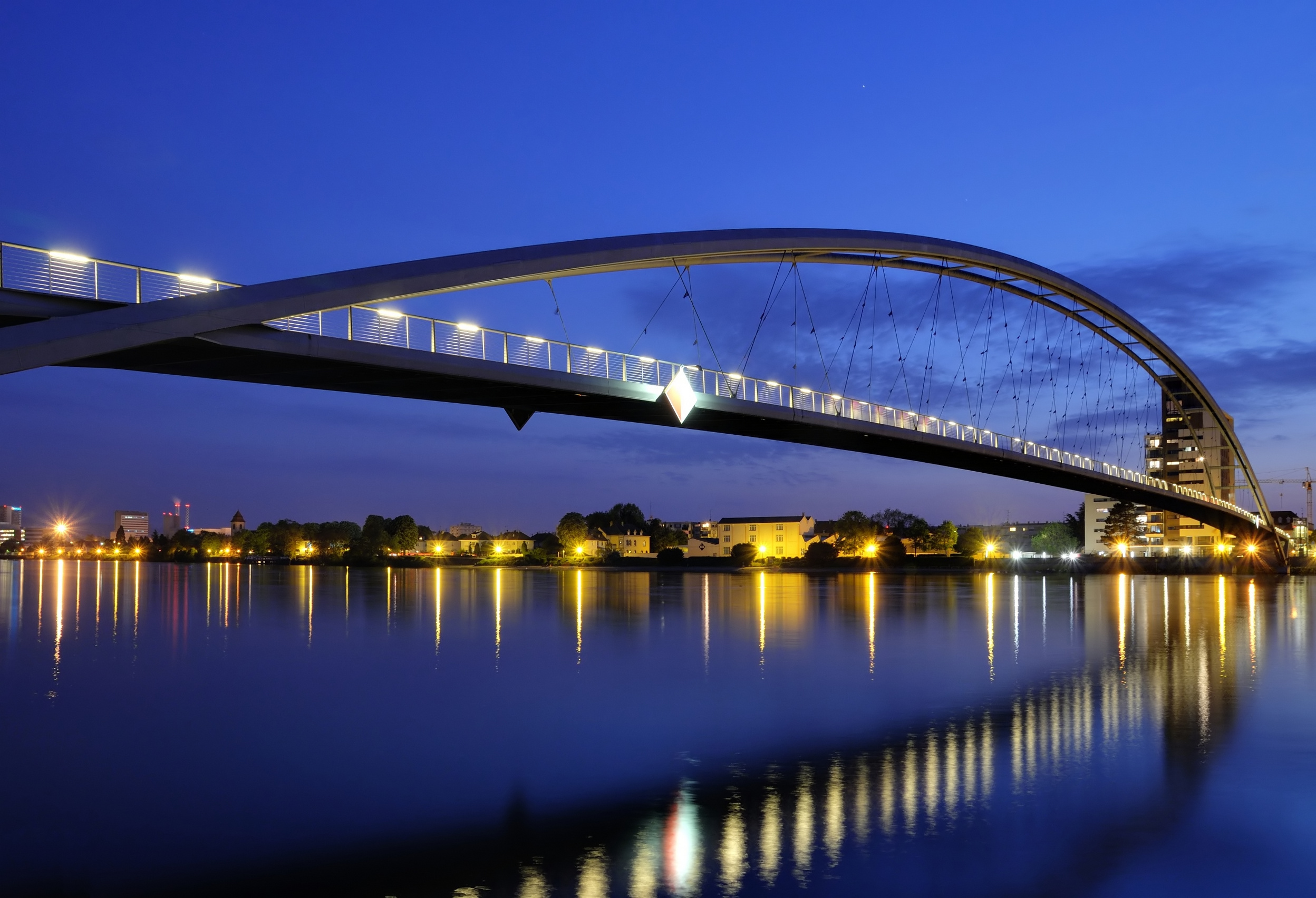
- The Three Countries Bridge
- Coordinates: 47°35′29.5″N 7°35′24″E
- Crosses: Rhine
- Locale: Huningue, France / Weil-am-Rhein, Germany; near Basel (Basle), Switzerland

Characteristics
- Total length: 248 metres (814 ft)
- Width: 5.5 metres (18 ft)
- Height: 24.75 metres (81.2 ft)
- Longest span: 229.4 metres (753 ft)
- Clearance above: 7.8 metres (26 ft)

History
- Architect: Dietmar Feichtinger
- Engineering design by: Leonhardt, Andrä und Partner
- Construction start: 2006
- Construction end: 2007
- Construction cost: €10,000,000 (approximate)
- Opened: 2007
- Inaugurated: 30 June 2007

Statistics
- Daily traffic: Cyclists and pedestrians

Location
- Interactive map of Three Countries Bridge

The Three Countries Bridge (German: Dreiländerbrücke, French: La passerelle des Trois Pays) is an arch bridge which crosses the Rhine between the commune of Huningue (France) and Weil am Rhein (Germany), within the Basel (Switzerland) metropolitan area. It is the world's longest single-span bridge dedicated exclusively to carrying pedestrians and cyclists. (Note: Pyrmont Bridge over Darling Harbour in Sydney, Australia is longer but it used to carry road traffic and monorail.) Its overall length is 248 metres (813 ft 8 in) and its main span is 229.4 metres (752 ft 7 in).

Its name comes from the bridge's location between France, Germany and Switzerland (which is about 200 metres (660 ft) distant). It was designed by the Franco-Austrian architect Dietmar Feichtinger.

== Location ==
The first crossing at this place was built for Huningue Castle and was destroyed by French troops in 1797. The Three Countries Bridge is located at the exact spot where, on 20 October 1944, the Huningue pontoon bridge was destroyed by Allied incendiary bombs. From then until the opening of Palmrainbrücke for road vehicles in 1979, the German federal highway number 532 ended at this point with a car ferry crossing. So as not to block the view from Place Abbatucci (Huningue central square) along the Rue de France and across the river to Weil-am-Rhein Hauptsrasse on the opposite side (and vice versa); the bridge is built just north of the line of these roads.

== Construction ==
The bridge is an arch bridge with a centre lane, and at 229 metres (751 ft) is the world's longest span pedestrian bridge. Its total length is 248 metres (814 ft) with no vehicle access ramps. The arch rise measures only 20 metres (66 ft), and the highest point is about 25 metres (82 ft) above the water, with the bridge deck about 14 metres (46 ft) below the arch crown. Seen in cross-section, the supporting structure is asymmetric. On the up-river side it is a hexagonal cross-section of sheet steel, and downstream are two others; the first is more inclined to the inside and the latter two are bearing the brunt of the load. The building was designed by architect Dietmar Feichtinger, in collaboration with the Büro LAP Leonhardt Andra & Partner (Berlin / Stuttgart).

The construction of the bridge required 1,012 tonnes (996 long tons; 1,116 short tons) of steel, 1,798 cubic metres (63,500 cu ft) of concrete, and 805 metres (2,641 ft) of cables of 30 and 60 centimetres (12 and 24 in) in diameter. The construction cost was nine million euros, which were funded by grants from the European Union, the State of Baden-Württemberg, the Haut-Rhin département, and the two neighbouring communities.

The bridge was assembled nearby in Huningue, then transported on 26 November 2006 to its current site on the Rhine. The bridge opened to the public on 30 March 2007, and was officially inaugurated on the night of 30 June − 1 July 2007.

In 2008 it was awarded the German Bridge Construction Prize (Deutscher Brückenbaupreis).

== See also ==
- List of bridges in France
- List of bridges in Germany
- List of international bridges

== Sources ==
- Gerhard Mehlhorn (Hrsg.): Handbuch Brücken: Entwerfen, Konstruieren, Berechnen, Bauen und Erhalten, Springer Berlin Heidelberg 2010, 978–3642044229, S. 129.
- Ursula Baus, Mike Schaich: Footbridges, Birkhäuser Verlag, 2007, ISBN 978-3764381394, Seite 176–177.
- http://www.w-wt.de/tourismus_englisch/architektur_und_design_dreilaenderbruecke.html
