= Musée d'art contemporain de Lyon =

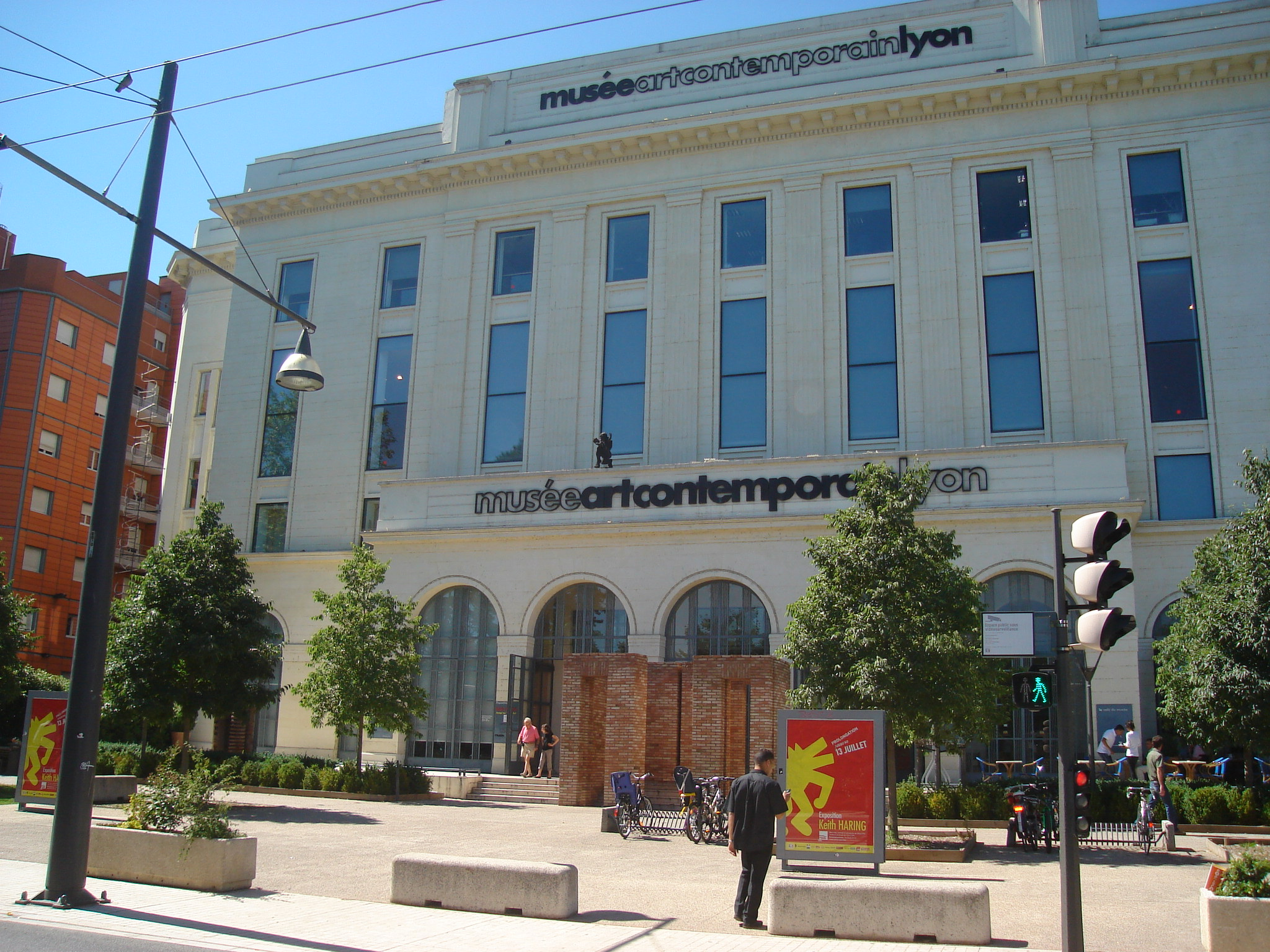
- Facade of the museum

- Location within Metropole de Lyon

General information
- Type: Museum
- Architectural style: 1930s / modern
- Location: 81, quai Charles de Gaules, 6th arrondissement of Lyon, Lyon, France
- Coordinates: 45°47′03″N 4°51′09″E
- Construction started: 1984 (in the Musée des Beaux-Arts); 1995 (Cité Internationale)
- Inaugurated: 1995

Design and construction
- Architect: Renzo Piano

The Musée d'art contemporain de Lyon (French pronunciation: [myze daʁ kɔ̃tɑ̃pɔʁɛ̃ də ljɔ̃]) is a museum devoted to contemporary art, located in the 6th arrondissement of Lyon, in the Cité Internationale, next to the cinema, in front of the Parc de la Tête d'Or. It had over 42,000 visitors in 2007.

== History ==
The decision to create the museum occurred in 1983, and was organized in 1984, but at the time it was housed in the Museum of Fine Arts of Lyon and was named Musée Saint-Pierre art contemporain. In 1988, it officially received the status of contemporary art museum granted by the Direction des Musées de France. In 1995, it moved to the 6th arrondissement in a building designed by Renzo Piano. It was inaugurated on 19 December of the same year, and welcomed nearly 130,000 visitors during the two months of the 3rd Biennial of Lyon.

The building has both a 1930s, facade and a modern brick volume. It has two side entrances and a 2700 sq.m. area. It has organized over a hundred exhibitions.

The museum's philosophy is to present works created by artists directly on the site. The permanent collection, which is the largest European group installations ever assembled in a museum, alternates with temporary exhibitions. Between each exhibition, a nearly six-month closure per year is necessary to put in place the future exhibition.

The museum has now become the symbol of "an open city and an uninhibited art". According to director Thierry Raspail, its funding is mainly directed by the city of Lyon, and 5% by the State.

On March 30, 2018, Thierry Raspail, director of macLYON since its creation in 1984, and co-founder of the Biennale de Lyon, announced his departure from the museum. After having been in charge of exhibitions at the macLYON for almost 15 years, Isabelle Bertolotti took over the management of the museum, accompanied by Julien Nemoz as administrator.

== Exhibitions ==
- Quintet, group show with Stéphane Blanquet, Masse, Gilbert Shelton, Joost Swarte and Chris Ware (3 March 2010 – 11 July 2010)
- Ben Vautier (3 March 2010 – 11 July 2010)
- Olivier Mosset (11 September 2010 – 2 January 2011)
- Trisha Brown (11 September 2010 – 2 January 2011)
- Bruce Nauman (11 September 2010 – 2 January 2011)
- Pascale-Marthine Tayou (24 February 2011 – 15 May 2011)
- Indian Highway IV (24 February 2011 – 31 July 2011)
