= Chassieu =

Chassieu Chassiô (Arpitan)
- Commune
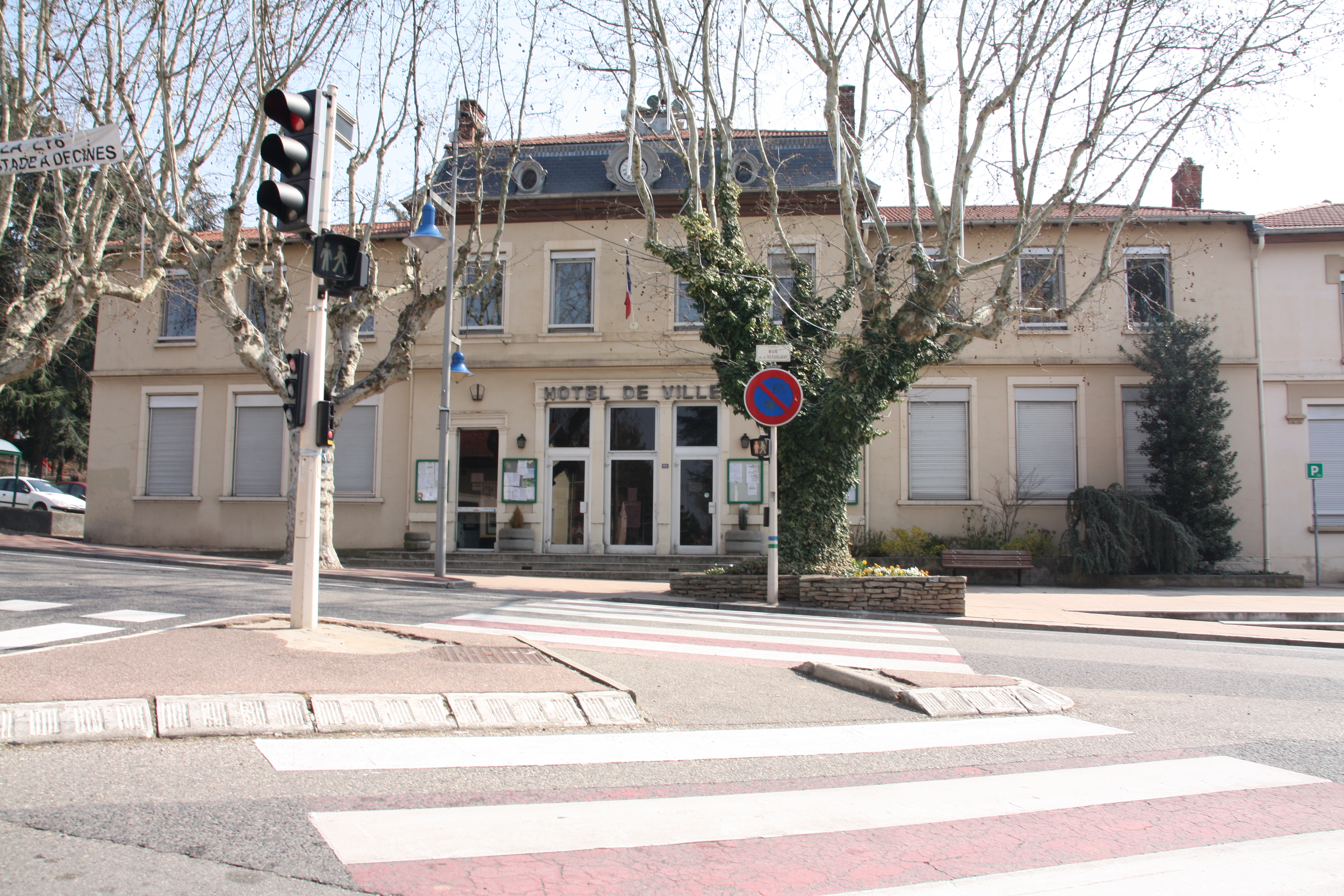
- The town hall of the commune

- Coat of arms
- Location of Chassieu
- Location within France Location within Auvergne-Rhône-Alpes
- Coordinates: 45°44′42″N 4°57′58″E
- Country: France
- Region: Auvergne-Rhône-Alpes
- Metropolis: Lyon Metropolis
- Arrondissement: Lyon

Government
  - Mayor (2021–2026): Jean-Jacques Sellès
- Area^{1}: 11.57 km^{2} (4.47 sq mi)
- Elevation: 204 m (669 ft)
- Highest elevation: 238 m (781 ft)
- Lowest elevation: 190 m (620 ft)
- Population (2023): 11,208
  - Density: 968.7/km^{2} (2,509/sq mi)
- Time zone: UTC+01:00 (CET)
  - Summer (DST): UTC+02:00 (CEST)
- INSEE/Postal code: 69271 /69680
- ^{1} French Land Register data, which excludes lakes, ponds, glaciers > 1 km^{2} (0.386 sq mi or 247 acres) and river estuaries.

Chassieu (French pronunciation: [ʃasjø]; Arpitan: Chassiô [θa.ˈʃy]) is a commune in the Metropolis of Lyon in the Auvergne-Rhône-Alpes region in eastern France.

== Population ==
Historical population
Year	Pop.	±% p.a.
1968	2,867	—
1975	3,599	+3.30%
1982	6,882	+9.70%
1990	8,508	+2.69%
1999	9,049	+0.69%
2007	9,371	+0.44%
2012	9,800	+0.90%
2017	10,359	+1.12%
2023	11,208	+1.32%
Source: INSEE

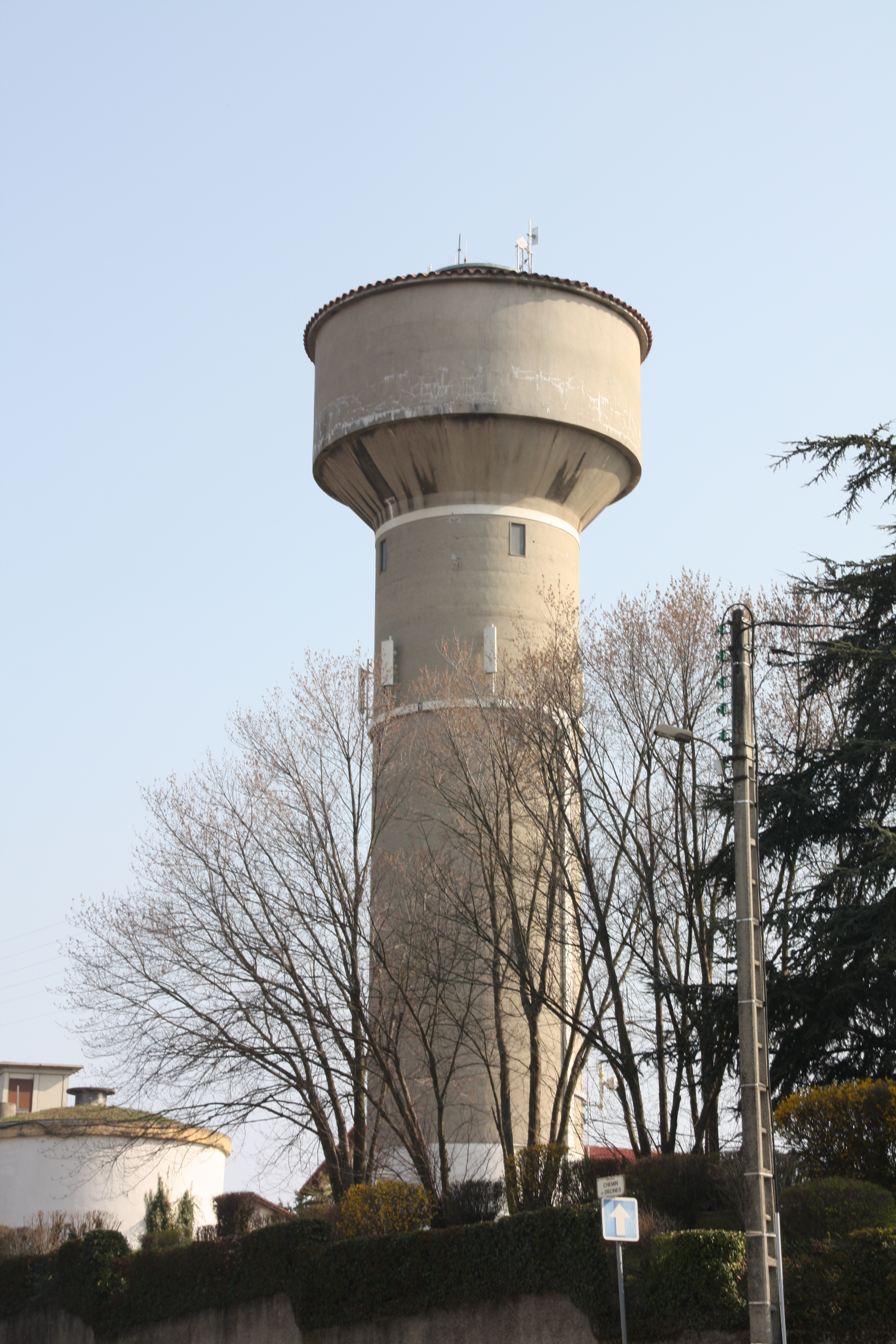
Water Tower on Mount St. Paul

== Twin town ==
Chassieu has been twinned with Coleshill, England, near Birmingham since 1983.

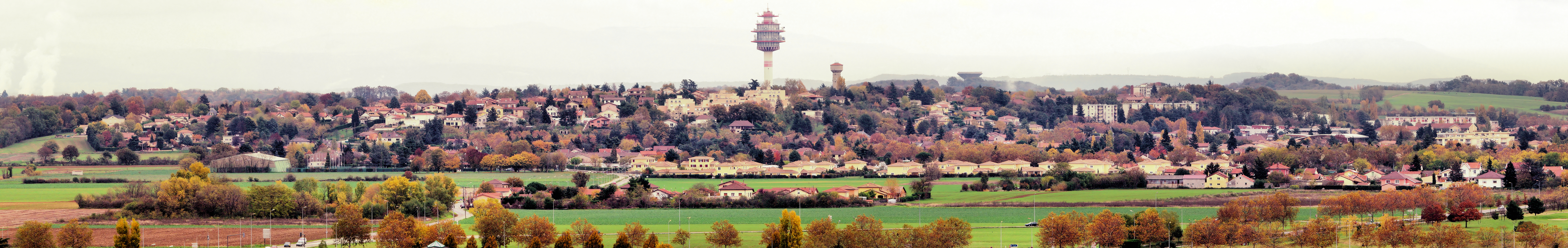
Panorama of Chassieu

== See also ==
- Eurexpo
