= Eurexpo =

Convention center in Chassieu, France

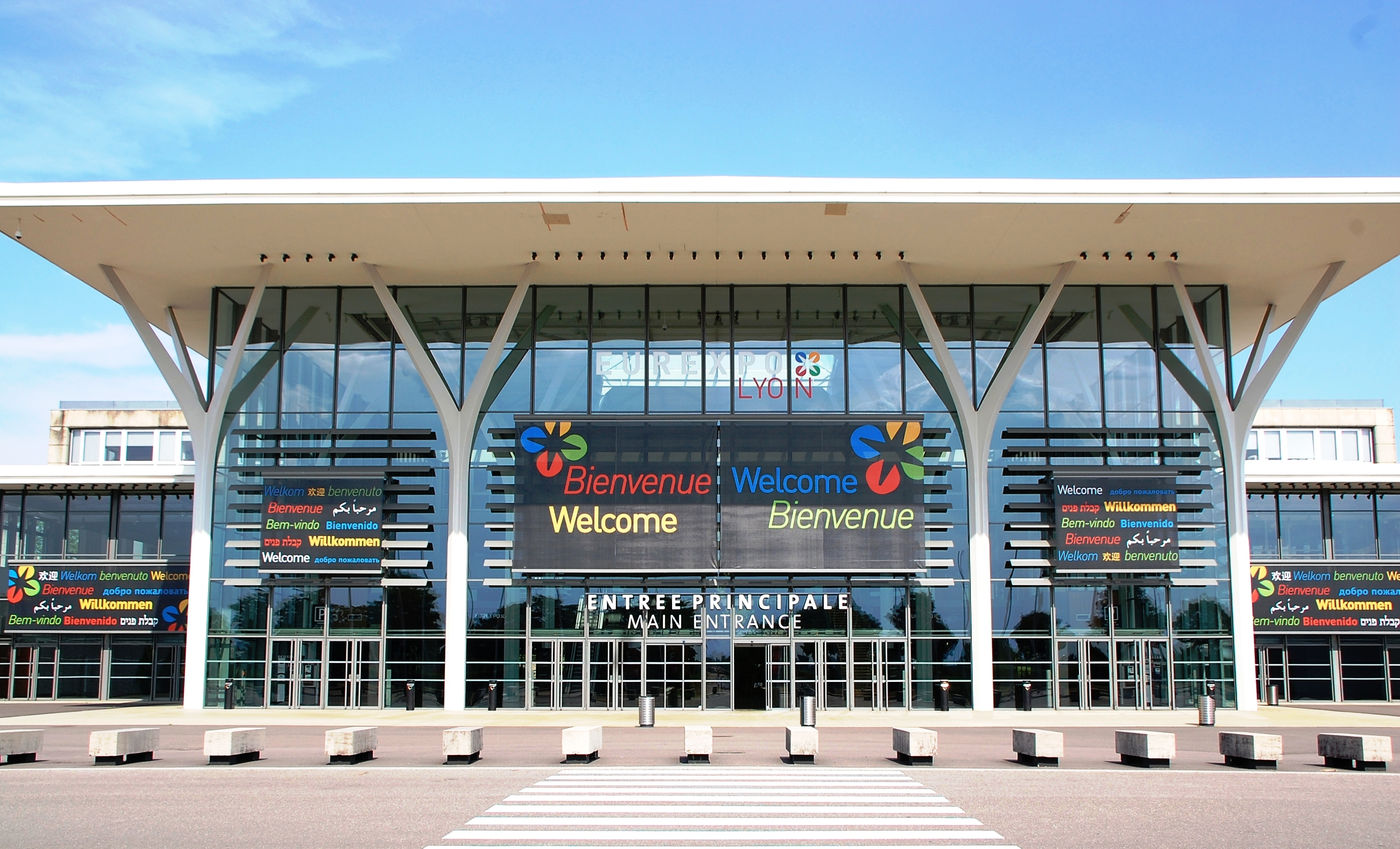
- Interactive map of Eurexpo
- Location: Chassieu, Metropolis of Lyon, France
- Coordinates: 45.7308°N 4.9503°E
- Owner: Société d’Exploitation du Centre de Conventions et d’Expositions de Lyon
- Public transit: Eurexpo Eurexpo

Construction
- Built: 1984

Website
- www.eurexpo.com?lang=en

Eurexpo is a convention center and exhibition hall in the commune of Chassieu, south-east of Lyon. It is the site of the annual Foire de Lyon.

== Description ==
Built in 1984, the 110-hectare (270-acre) site includes 13,000 parking spaces, a total exhibition space of 130,000 square metres (1,400,000 square feet) made up of thirteen exhibition halls ranging from 2,000 square metres (22,000 sq ft) to 12,000 square metres (130,000 sq ft), and an outdoor exhibition area of 51,000 square metres (550,000 sq ft). Eurexpo also houses seven restaurants and seven bars.

== Events and exhibitions ==
The center hosts annual exhibitions including the Foire de Lyon, the Salon Equita' de Lyon, the Salon Primevère, and the Salon Europack Euromanut. It will host figure skating, short track speed skating and curling at the 2030 Winter Olympics as well as para ice hockey and wheelchair curling at the 2030 Winter Paralympics in the French Alps.

== Halls ==
- Hall 1 – 6,084 square metres (65,490 sq ft)
- Hall 2.1 – 6,201 square metres (66,750 sq ft)
- Hall 2.2 – 6,084 square metres (65,490 sq ft)
- Hall 2.3 – 3,500 square metres (38,000 sq ft)
- Hall 3.1 – 5,863 square metres (63,110 sq ft)
- Hall 3.2 – 10,764 square metres (115,860 sq ft)
- Hall 4.1 – 974 square metres (10,480 sq ft)
- Hall 4.2 – 12,168 square metres (130,980 sq ft)
- Hall 5.1 – 5,863 square metres (63,110 sq ft)
- Hall 5.2 – 10,764 square metres (115,860 sq ft)
- Hall 6.1 – 6,084 square metres (65,490 sq ft)
- Hall 6.2 – 11,076 square metres (119,220 sq ft)
- Hall 6.3 – 10,050 square metres (108,200 sq ft)

== Public transit ==
Eurexpo is served by the TCL public transport network at the station Eurexpo:

- (station Eurexpo is served even without exhibition in Eurexpo, except during summer)
  - Connections:,
  - Access to Lyon-Perrache station through a connection with at Grange Blanche
- (bus line N100 running only during exhibitions at Eurexpo)
  - Connections:,, Rhônexpress
  - Access to Lyon-Part-Dieu station and La Part-Dieu business district through a connection with at Vaulx-en-Velin–La Soie
  - Access to Lyon–Saint-Exupéry Airport and high speed rail station through a connection with Rhônexpress rail shuttle at Vaulx-en-Velin–La Soie
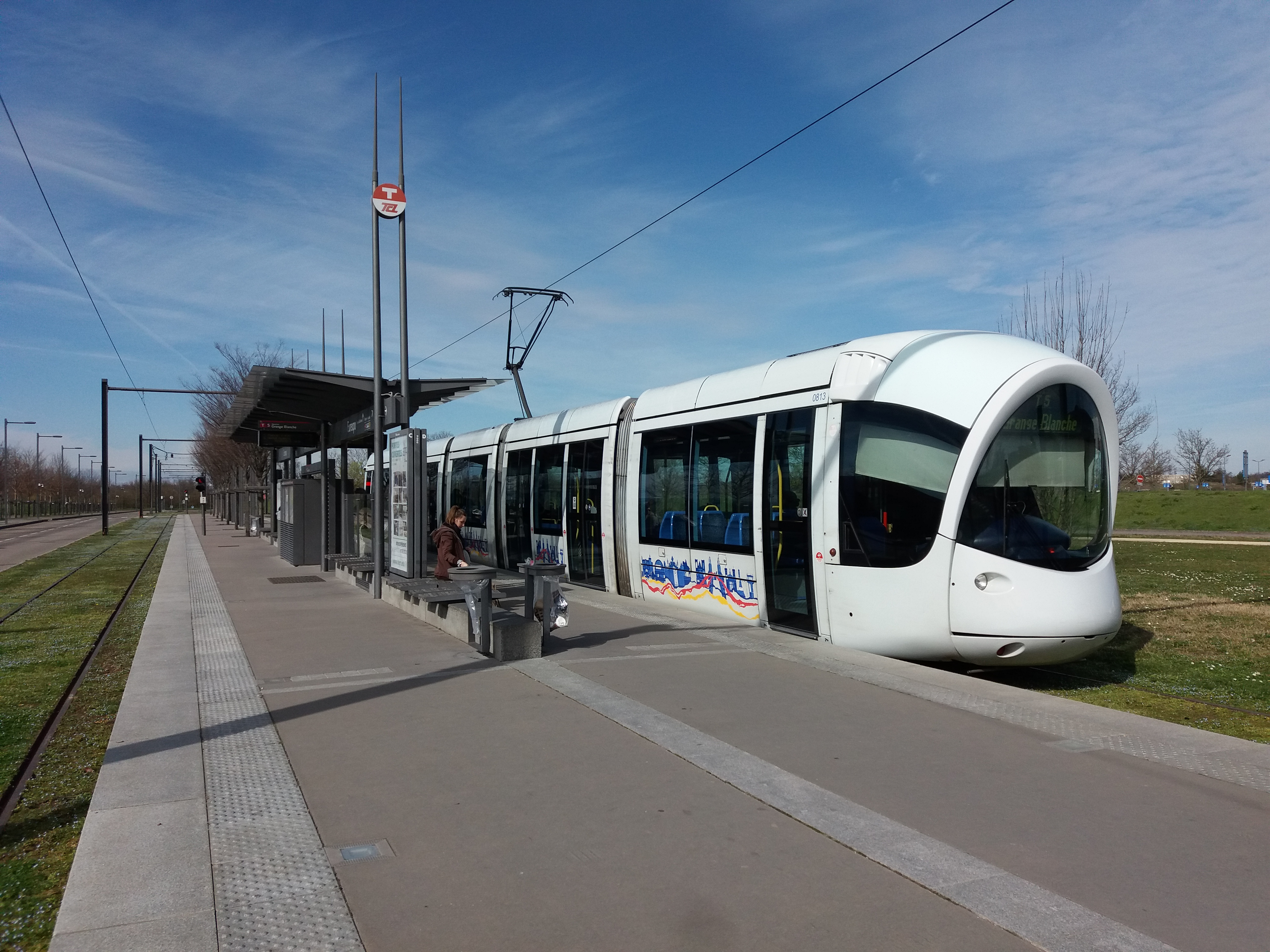
Station of tram T5

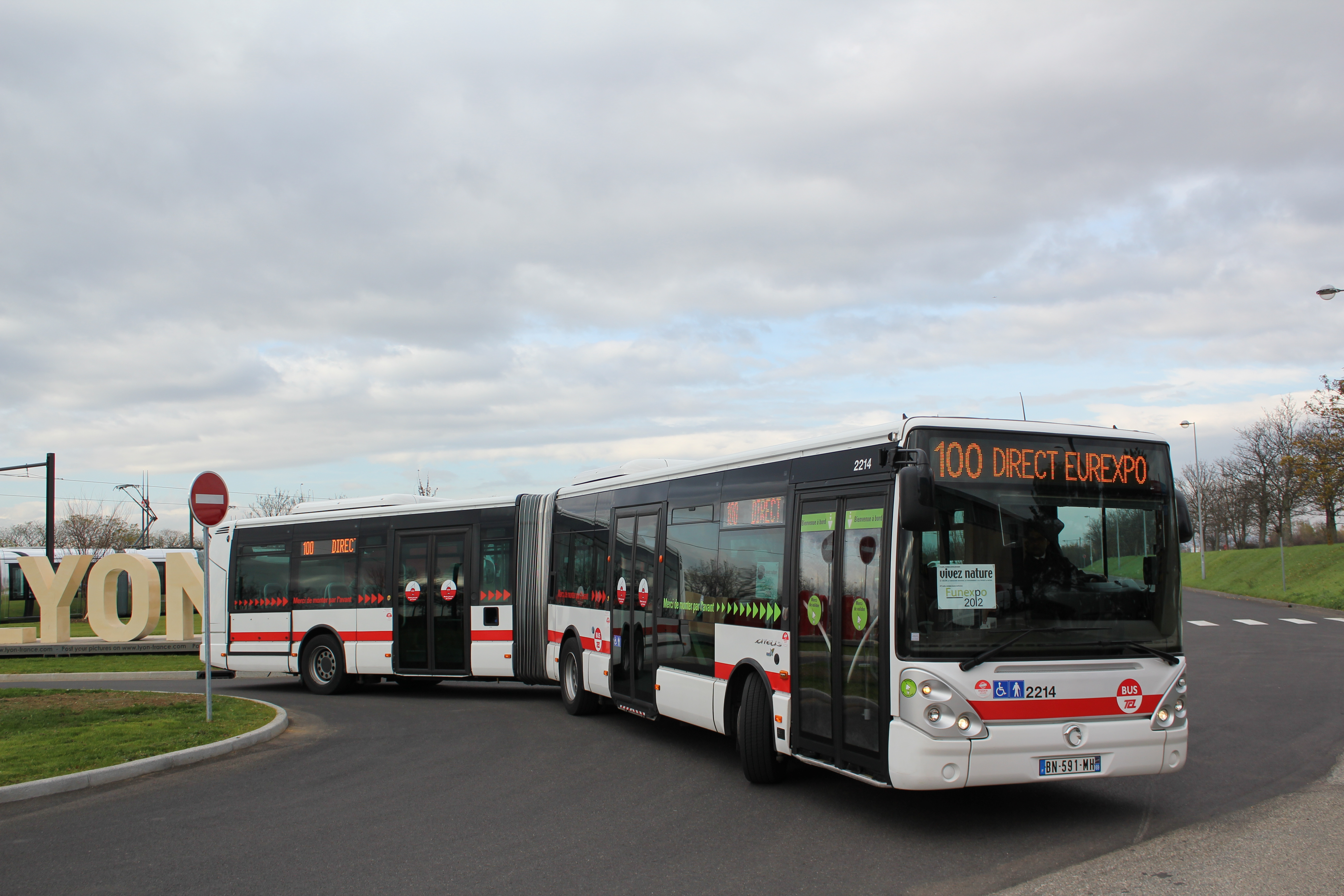
Bus N100 (formerly 100) near Eurexpo
