= Lyon =

City in France

Lyon Liyon (Arpitan)
- Prefecture and commune
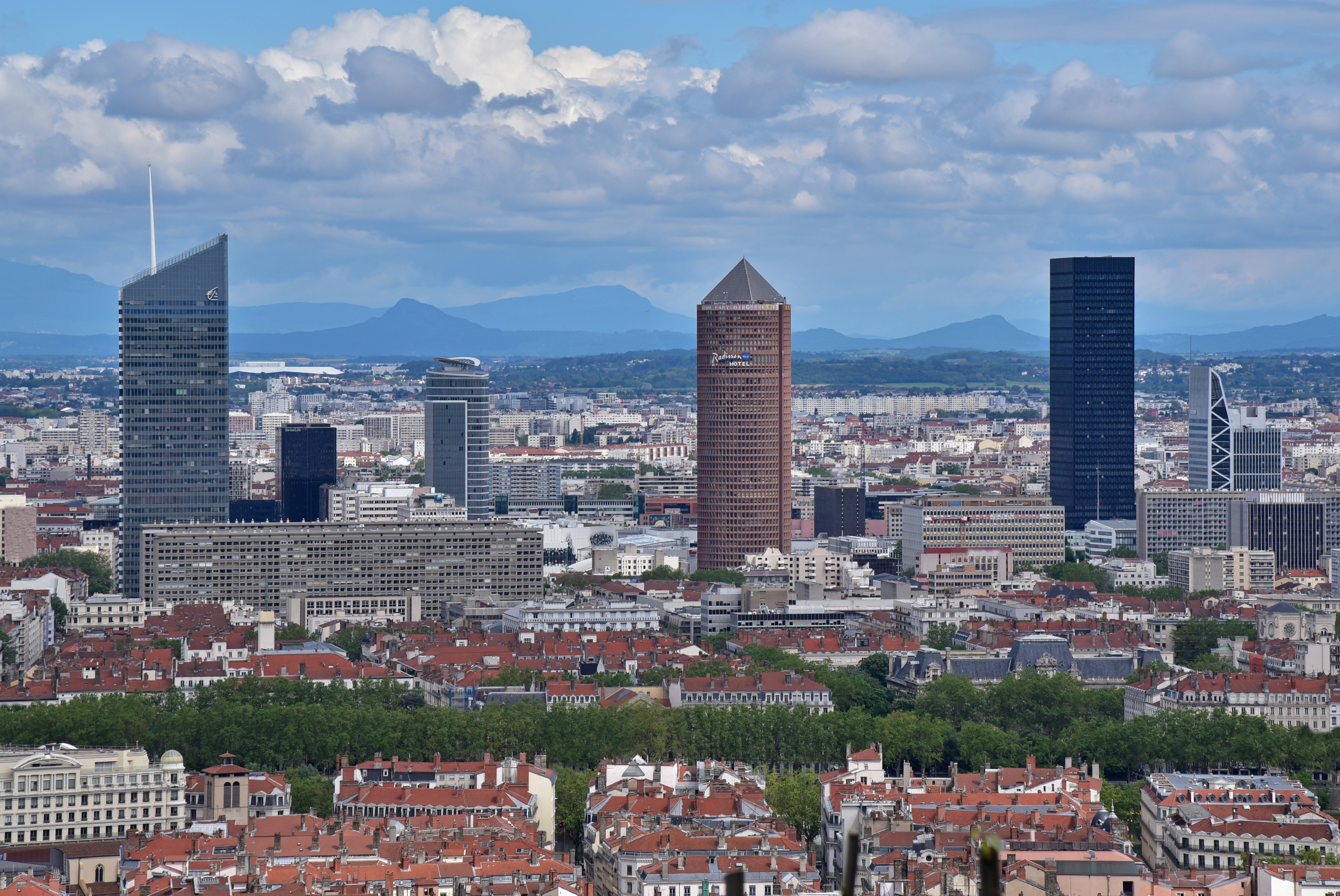
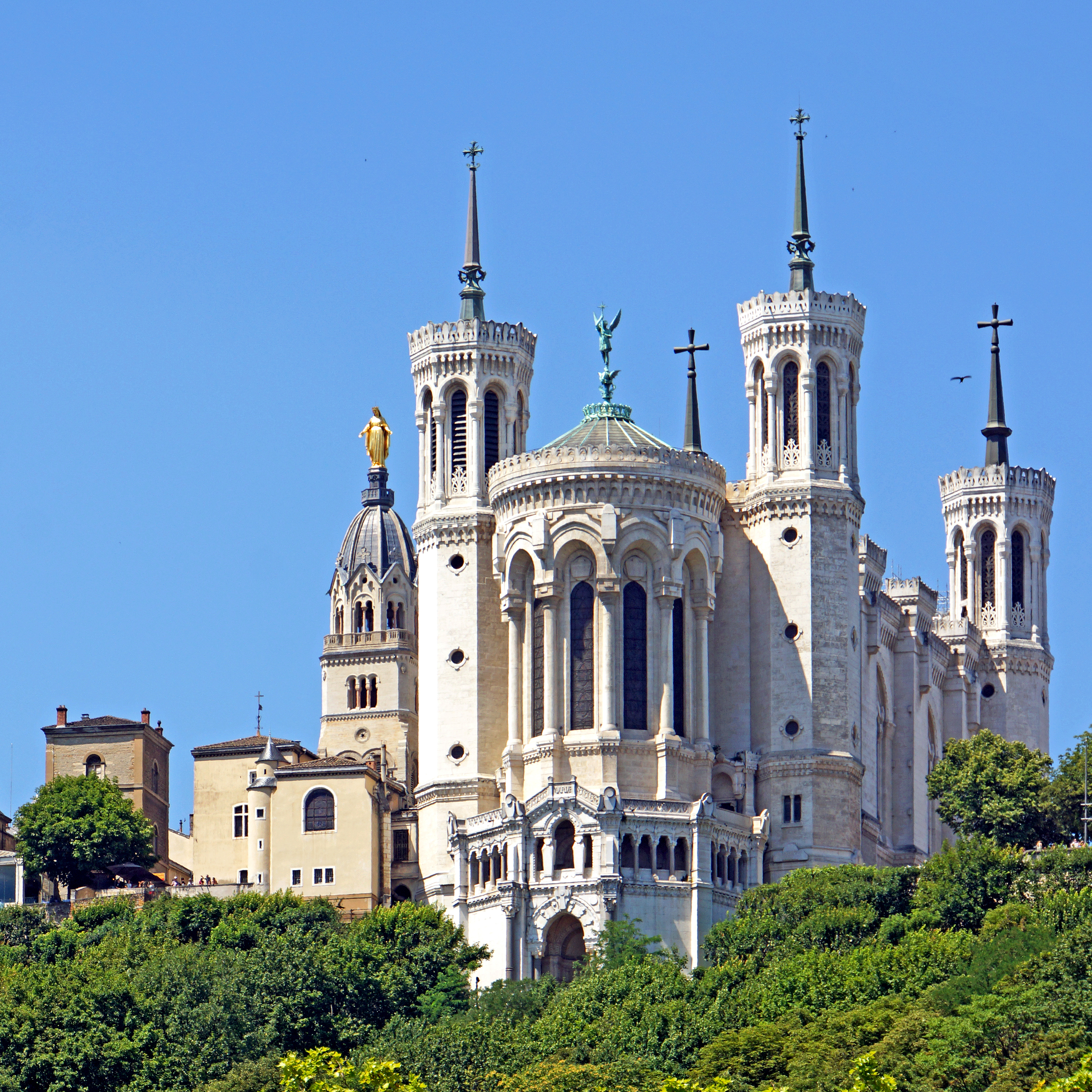
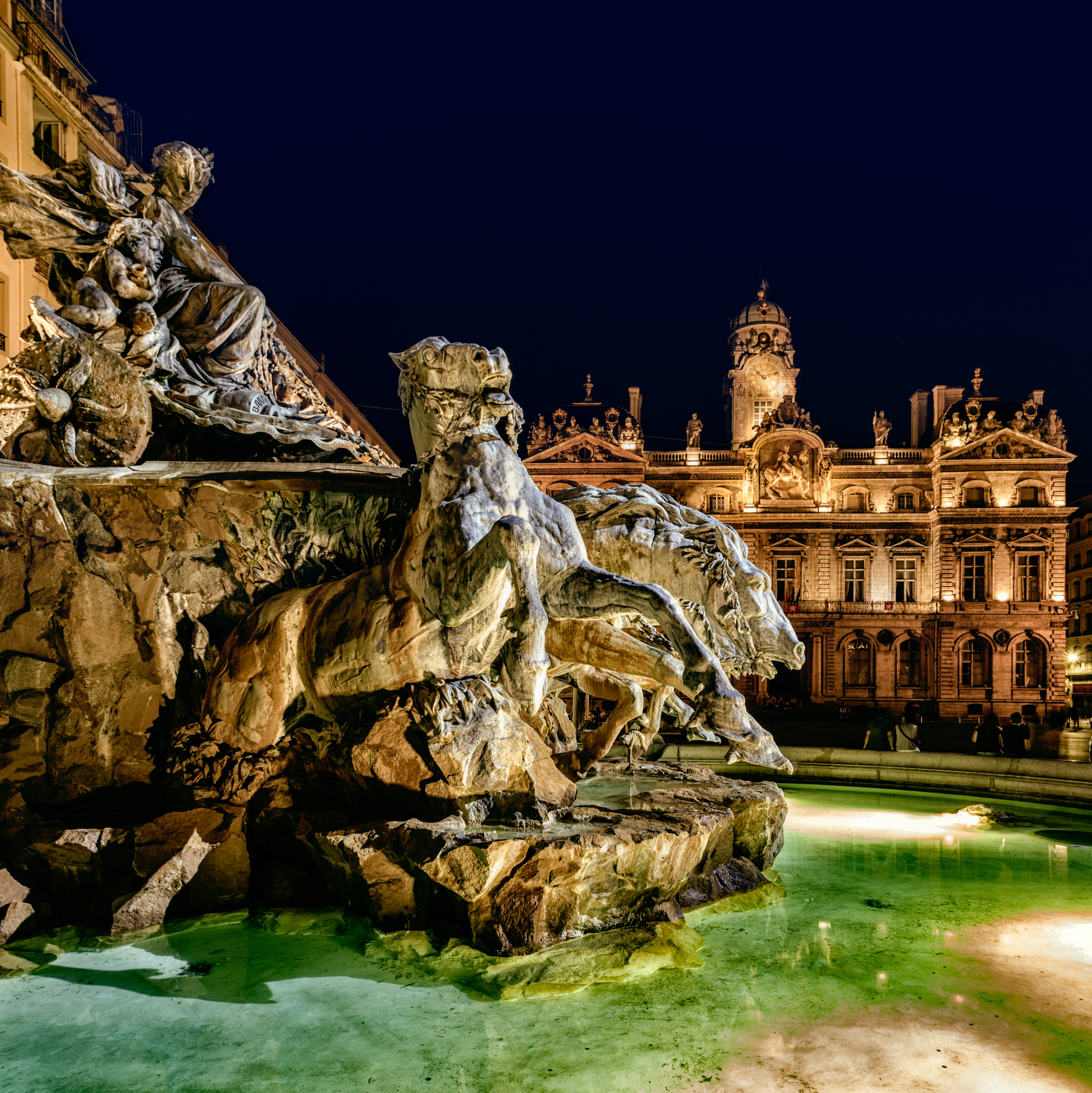
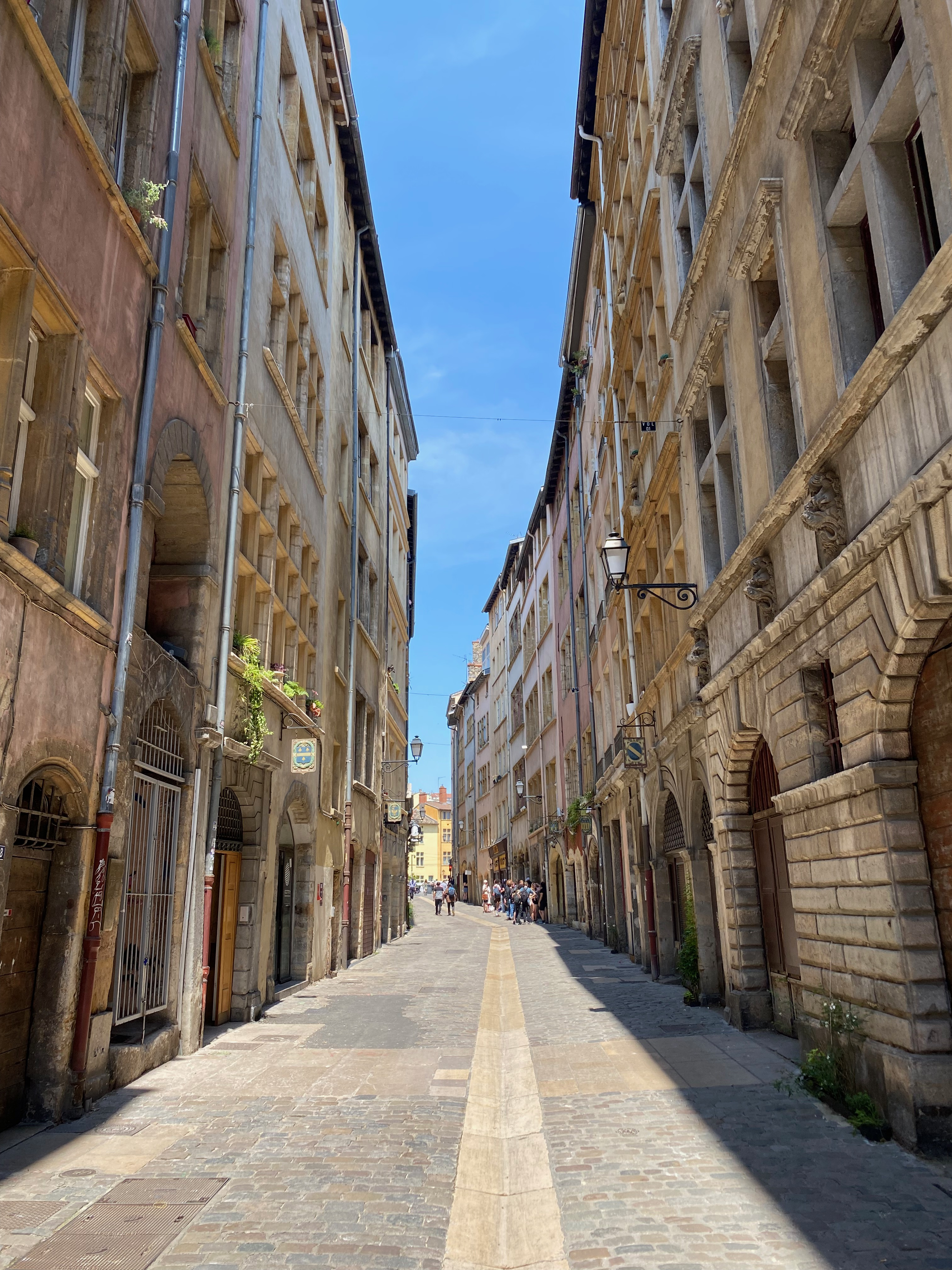
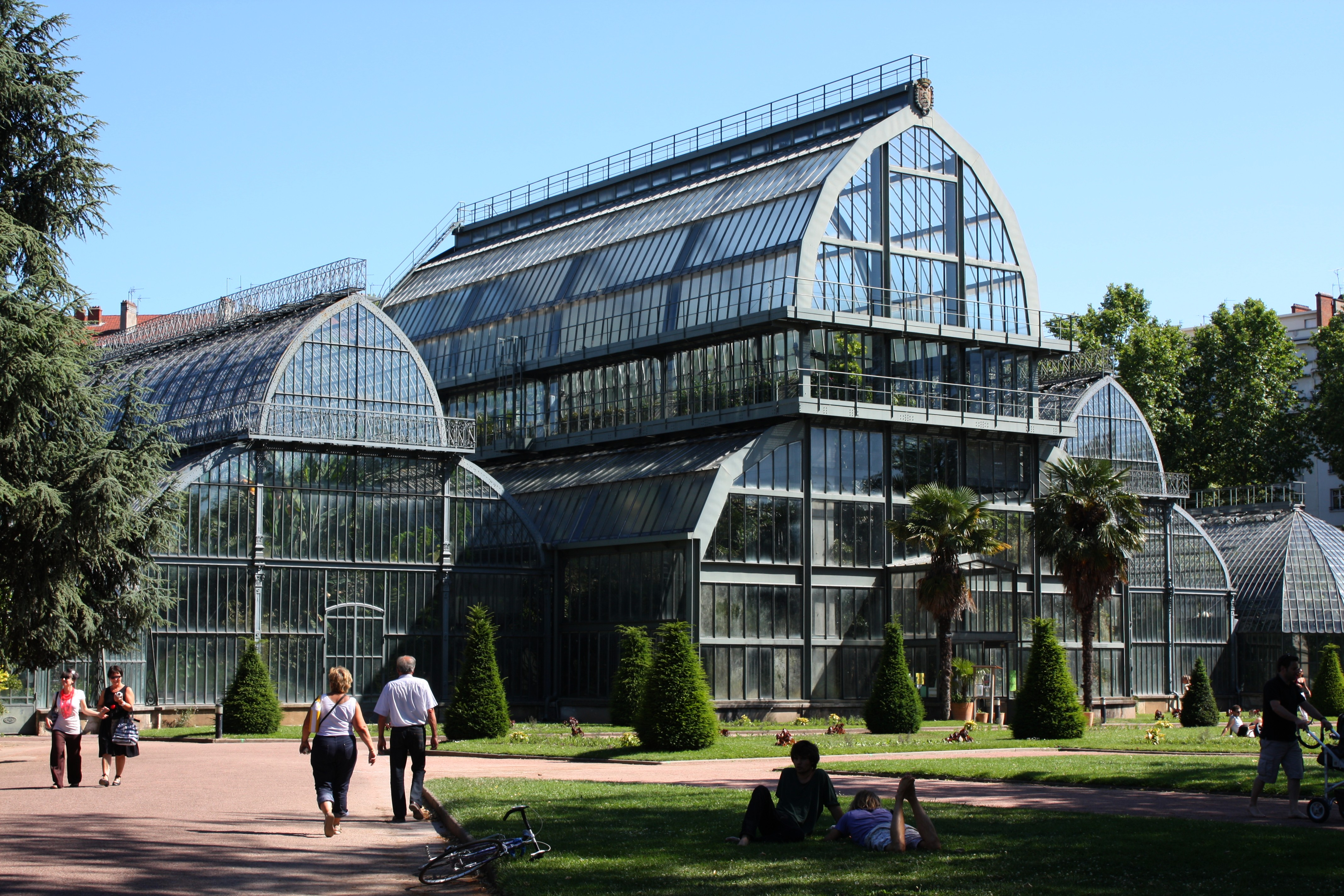
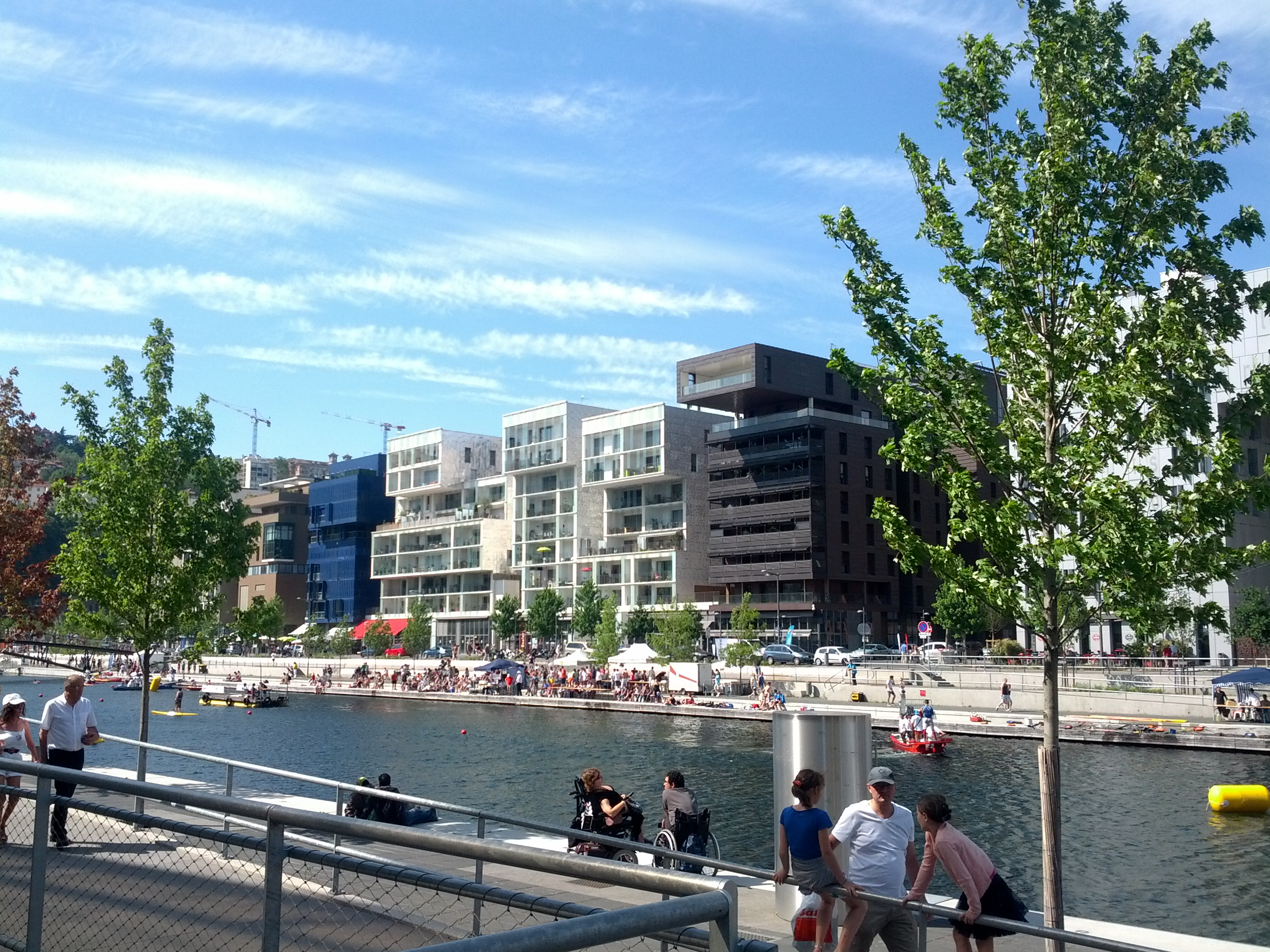
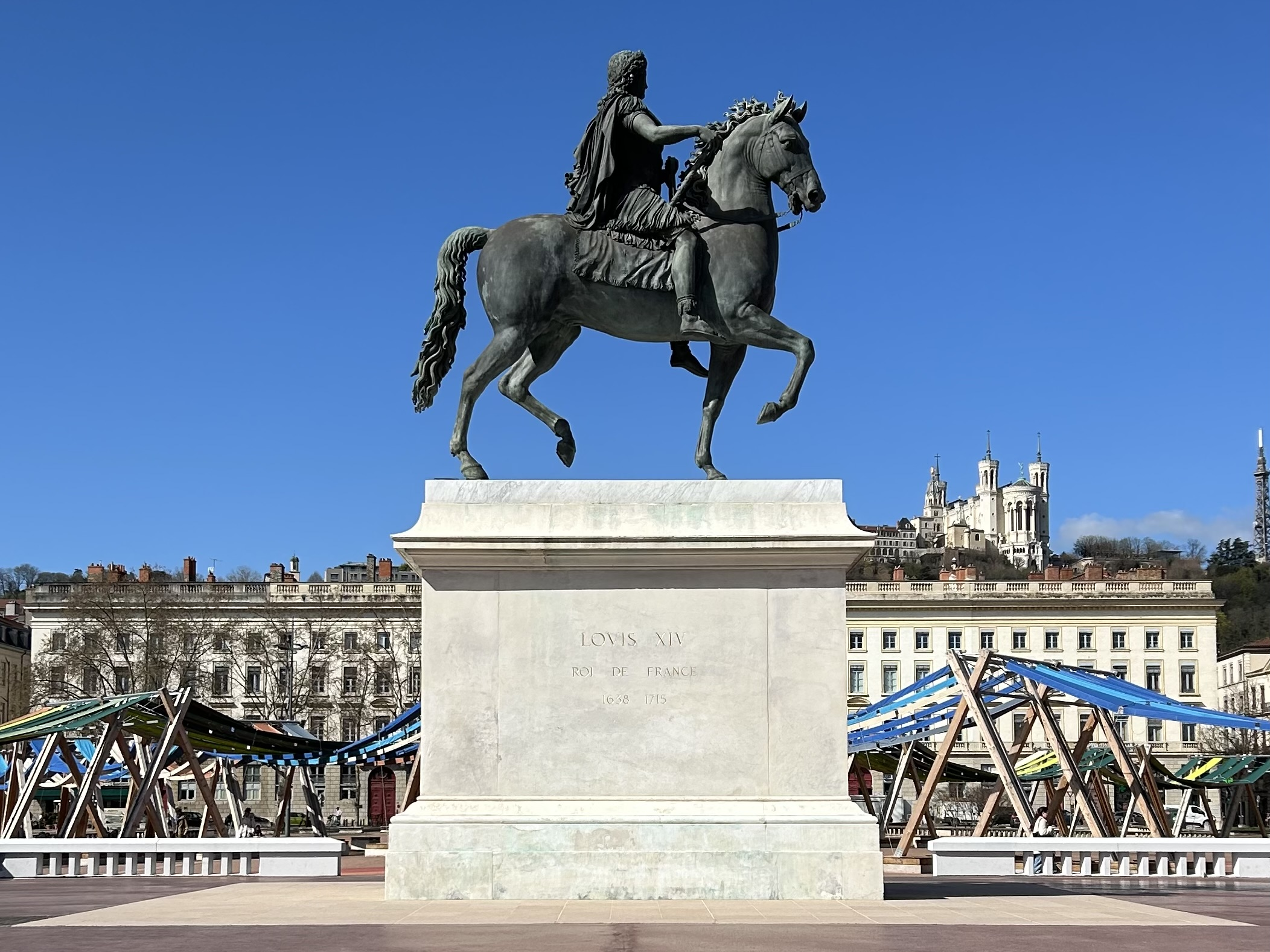
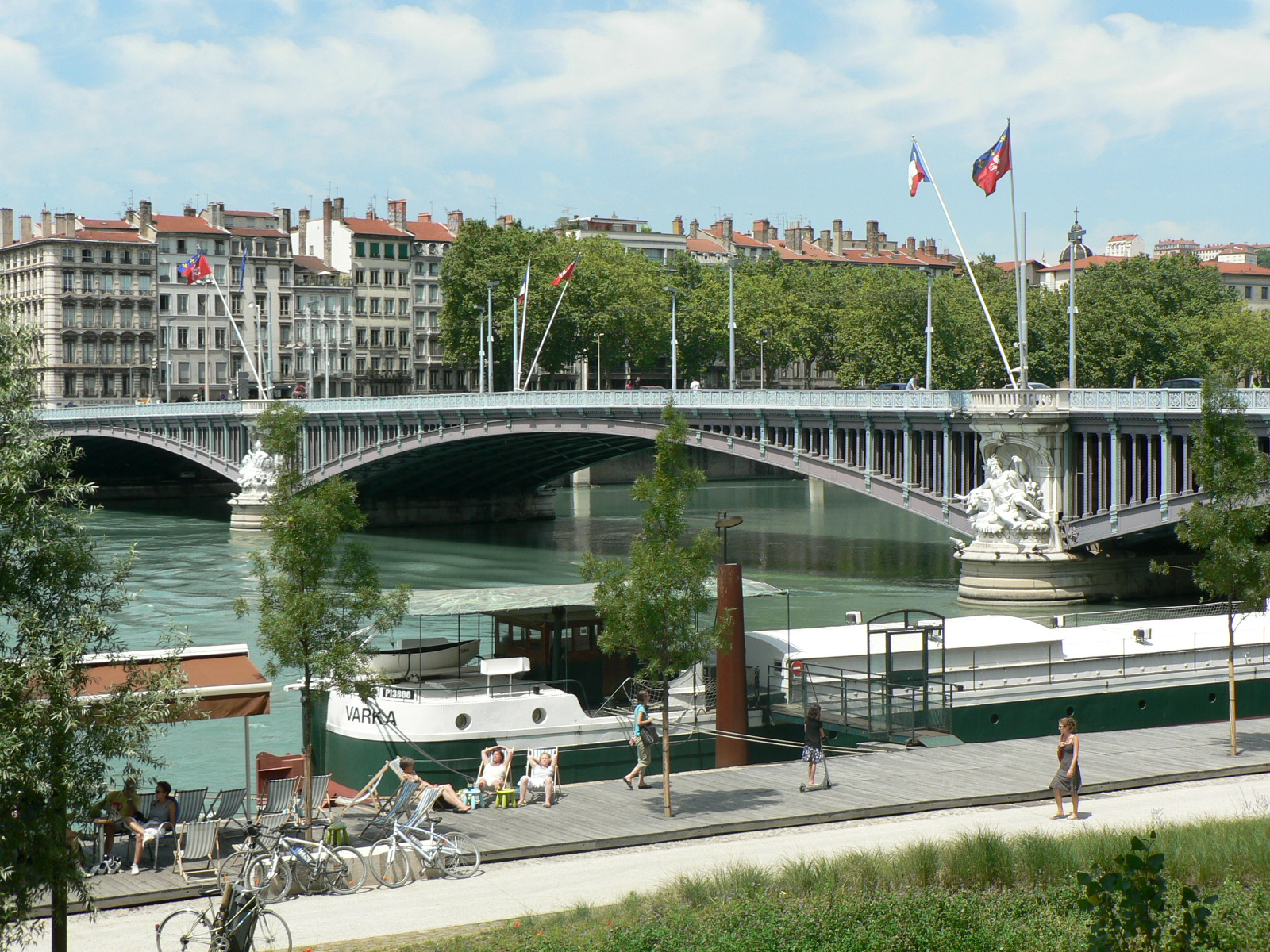
- Skyline of Lyon in La Part-Dieu Basilica of Notre-Dame de Fourvière Place des Terreaux with the Fontaine Bartholdi Vieux Lyon Parc de la Tête d'or Confluence District Place Bellecour Pont Lafayette

- Flag Coat of arms
- Motto(s): Avant, avant, Lion le melhor (old Franco-Provençal for "Forward, forward, Lyon the best") (Note: A war cry from 1269, spelt in modern Franco-Provençal as Avant, Avant, Liyon lo mèlyor.); Virtute duce, comite fortuna ("With virtue as guide and fortune as companion") (Note: Quote from a letter of Cicero to Lucius Munatius Plancus, founder of the city.)
- Location of Lyon
- Location within France Location within Auvergne-Rhône-Alpes
- Coordinates: 45°46′03″N 4°50′06″E
- Country: France
- Region: Auvergne-Rhône-Alpes
- Metropolis: Lyon Metropolis
- Arrondissement: Lyon
- Subdivisions: 9 arrondissements

Government
  - Mayor (2026–32): Grégory Doucet (LE)
- Area^{1}: 47.87 km^{2} (18.48 sq mi)
  - Urban (2023): 1,141.4 km^{2} (440.7 sq mi)
  - Metro (2023): 4,605.8 km^{2} (1,778.3 sq mi)
- Highest elevation: 349 m (1,145 ft)
- Lowest elevation: 162 m (531 ft)
- Population (2023): 519,127
  - Rank: 3rd in France
  - Density: 10,840/km^{2} (28,090/sq mi)
  - Urban (2023): 1,721,721
  - Urban density: 1,508.4/km^{2} (3,906.8/sq mi)
  - Metro (2023): 2,338,789
  - Metro density: 507.79/km^{2} (1,315.2/sq mi)
- Demonym: Lyonnais
- Time zone: UTC+01:00 (CET)
  - Summer (DST): UTC+02:00 (CEST)
- INSEE/Postal code: 69123 /69001-69009
- Website: lyon.fr
- ^{1} French Land Register data, which excludes lakes, ponds, glaciers > 1 km^{2} (0.386 sq mi or 247 acres) and river estuaries.

Lyon (Note: Pronunciation: UK: /ˈliːɒ̃/, US: /liˈoʊn/ lee-OHN; French: [ljɔ̃]; Arpitan: Liyon [ʎjɔ̃]; Occitan: Lion, hist. Lionés.) (Franco-Provençal: Liyon; formerly Lyons in English) (Note: Pronounced /ˈlaɪənz/ LY-ənz.; Proportion of spelling "Lyons" in US and UK English, 1800-2019) is a city in France. It is located at the confluence of the rivers Rhône and Saône, to the northwest of the French Alps, 391 km (243 mi) southeast of Paris, 278 km (173 mi) north of Marseille, and 113 km (70 mi) southwest of Geneva, Switzerland.

The City of Lyon is the third-largest city in France with a population of 519,127 as of 2023 within its small municipal territory of 48 km^{2} (19 sq mi), but together with its suburbs and exurbs the Lyon metropolitan area had a population of 2,338,789 that same year, the second largest in France. Lyon and 58 suburban municipalities have formed since 2015 the Metropolis of Lyon, a directly elected metropolitan authority now in charge of most urban issues, with a population of 1,436,354 in 2023. Lyon is the prefecture of the Auvergne-Rhône-Alpes region and seat of the Departmental Council of Rhône (whose jurisdiction, however, no longer extends over the Metropolis of Lyon since 2015).

The capital of the Gauls during the Roman Empire, Lyon is the seat of an archbishopric whose holder bears the title of Primate of the Gauls. Lyon became a major economic hub during the Renaissance. The city is recognised for its cuisine and gastronomy, as well as historical and architectural landmarks; the districts of Old Lyon, the Fourvière hill, the Presqu'île and the slopes of the Croix-Rousse are inscribed on the UNESCO World Heritage List. Lyon was historically an important area for the production and weaving of silk. Lyon has played a significant role in the history of cinema since Auguste and Louis Lumière invented the cinematograph there. The city is also known for its light festival, the Fête des lumières, which begins every 8 December and lasts for four days, earning Lyon the title of "Capital of Lights".

Economically, Lyon is a major centre for the banking, chemical, pharmaceutical and biotech industries. The city contains a significant software industry with a particular focus on video games; in recent years it has fostered a growing local start-up sector. The home of renowned universities and higher education schools, Lyon is the second-largest student city in France, with a university population of nearly 200,000 students within the Metropolis of Lyon. Lyon hosts the international headquarters of Interpol, the International Agency for Research on Cancer, as well as Euronews. According to the Globalization and World Rankings Research Institute, Lyon is considered a Beta city, as of 2018. It ranked second in France and 40th globally in Mercer's 2019 liveability rankings. Lyon will be the centre of the 2030 Winter Olympics.

== History ==
=== Toponymy ===
The name of the city evolved from the Gallic Lugdunon through the intermediate forms Lugdon and Luon.

The 9th-century Endlicher Glossary translates the name of the city as "Desired Mountain."

According to modern scholarship, the first part of the name may come from the Celtic god Lug (in charge of law and order, the name being cognate with Old Irish lugh and Modern Irish lú) or the derived word lugon, meaning "crow" (the crow being the messenger of Lug). Another theory is that it comes from the word lug, meaning "light". The second part of the name more clearly comes from dunos ('fortress', 'hill'). The name thus may be intended to refer to the hill of Fourvière, on which the ancient city of Lyon is founded, and mean "hill of the god Lug", "hill of the crows" or "shining hill".

Alternatively, Julius Pokorny associates the first part of the name with the Indo-European radical *lūg ('dark, black, swamp'), the basis of the toponyms Ludza in Latvia, Lusatia in Germany (from Sorbian Łužica), and several places in the Czech Republic named Lužice; it could then also be compared to Luze in Franche-Comté and various hydronyms such as Louge.

In Roman times the city was also called Caput Galliae, meaning "capital of the Gauls".

Lyon is called Liyon in Franco-Provençal.

Timeline of Lyon
Historical affiliations

Roman Empire (Gallia Lugdunensis), 43 BC-286
Western Roman Empire (Gallia Lugdunensis), 286-411
Kingdom of the Burgundians, 411–534
Francia, 534–843
Middle Francia, 843–855
Lotharingia, 855–879
Lower Burgundy, 879–933
Kingdom of Arles, 933–1312
Kingdom of France (Lyonnais), 1312–1792
French First Republic, 1792–1793
Counter-revolutionary, 1793
French First Republic, 1793–1804
First French Empire, 1804–1814
Kingdom of France, 1814–1815
First French Empire, 1815
Kingdom of France, 1815–1830
Kingdom of France, 1830–1848
French Second Republic, 1848–1852
Second French Empire, 1852–1870
French Third Republic, 1870–1940
Vichy France, 1940–1944
French Fourth Republic, 1944–1958
France, 1958–present

=== Ancient Lyon ===
According to the historian Dio Cassius, in 43 BC, the Roman Senate ordered the creation of a settlement for Roman refugees of war with the Allobroges. These refugees had been expelled from Vienne and were now encamped at the confluence of the Saône and Rhône rivers. The foundation was built on Fourvière hill and officially called Colonia Copia Felix Munatia, a name invoking prosperity and the blessing of the gods. The city became increasingly referred to as Lugdunum (and occasionally Lugudunum).

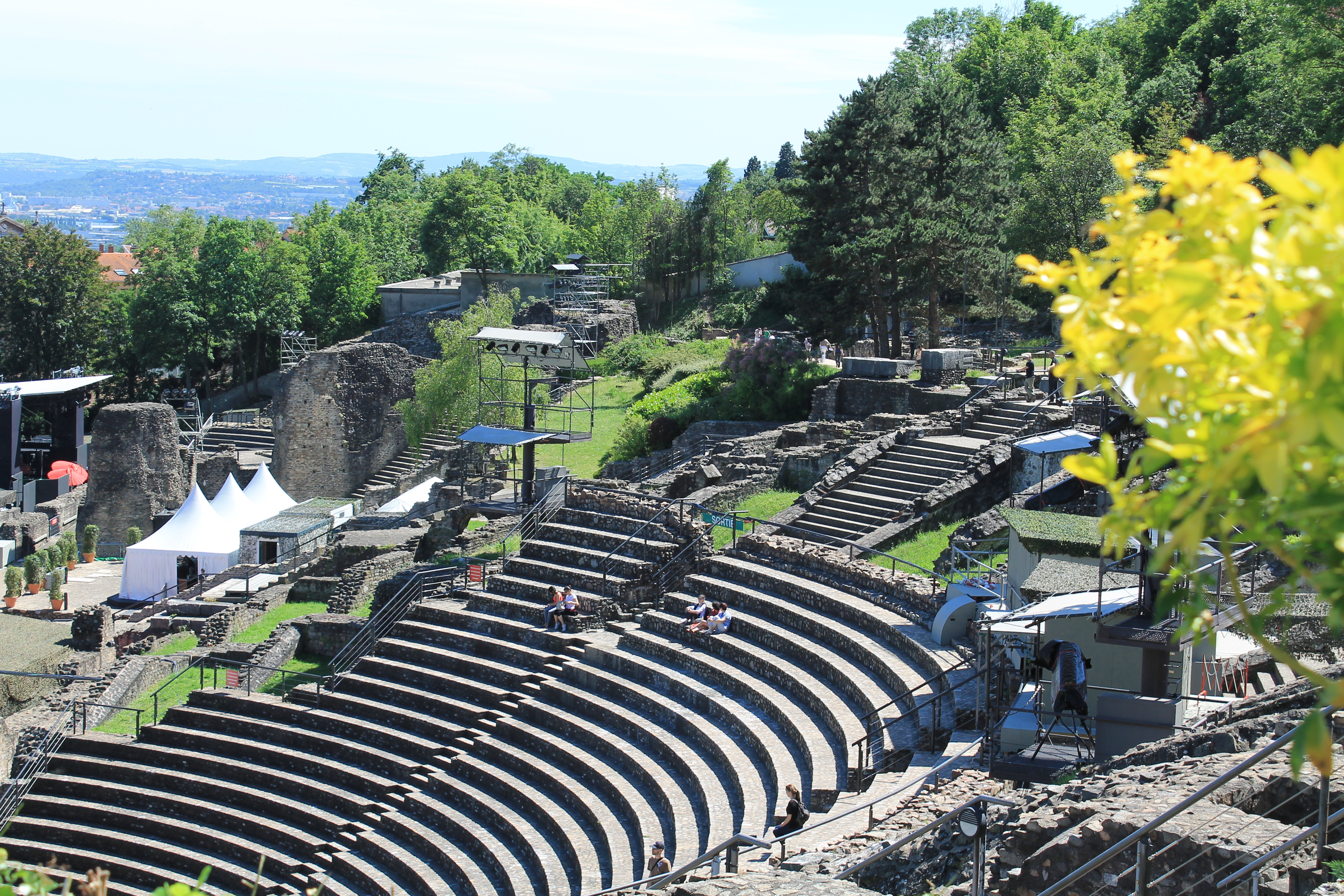
The Roman-era Theatre on the Fourvière Hill

The Romans recognised that Lugdunum's strategic location at the convergence of two navigable rivers made it a natural communications hub. The city became the starting point of main Roman roads in the area, and it quickly became the capital of the province, Gallia Lugdunensis. Two Emperors were born in this city: Claudius, whose speech is preserved in the Lyon Tablet in which he justifies the nomination of Gallic Senators, and Caracalla.

Early Christians in Lyon were martyred for their beliefs under the reigns of various Roman emperors, most notably Marcus Aurelius and Septimius Severus. Local saints from this period include Blandina, Pothinus, and Epipodius, among others. The Greek Irenaeus was the second bishop of Lyon during the latter part of the second century. To this day, the archbishop of Lyon is still referred to as "Primat des Gaules".

Burgundians fleeing the destruction of Worms by the Huns in 437 were re-settled in eastern Gaul. Out of this settlement the Kingdom of Burgundians emerged, first centered in Geneva and then in Lugdunum from 461 to 534.

=== Middle Ages ===
In 534 the Franks conquered the Kingdom of Burgundians, incorporating it into Francia under the Merovingians and, later, the Carolingians.

In 843, under the Treaty of Verdun, Lyon became part of Middle Francia under Lothair I. In 933 it become part of Kingdom of Arles, which itself was incorporated into the Holy Roman Empire in 1033. Lyon did not become part of the Kingdom of France until 1312.

=== Rennaissance to the Revolution ===
Fernand Braudel remarked, "Historians of Lyon are not sufficiently aware of the bi-polarity between Paris and Lyon, which is a constant structure in French development...from the late Middle Ages to the Industrial Revolution". In the late 15th century, the fairs introduced by Italian merchants made Lyon the economic counting house of France. Even the Bourse (treasury), built in 1749, resembled a public bazaar where accounts were settled in the open air. When international banking moved to Genoa, then Amsterdam, Lyon remained the banking centre of France.

During the Renaissance, the city's development was driven by the silk trade, which strengthened its ties to Italy. Italian influence on Lyon's architecture is still visible among historic buildings. In the late 1400s and 1500s Lyon was also a key centre of literary activity and book publishing, both of French writers (such as Maurice Scève, Antoine Héroet, and Louise Labé) and of Italians in exile (such as Luigi Alamanni and Gian Giorgio Trissino).

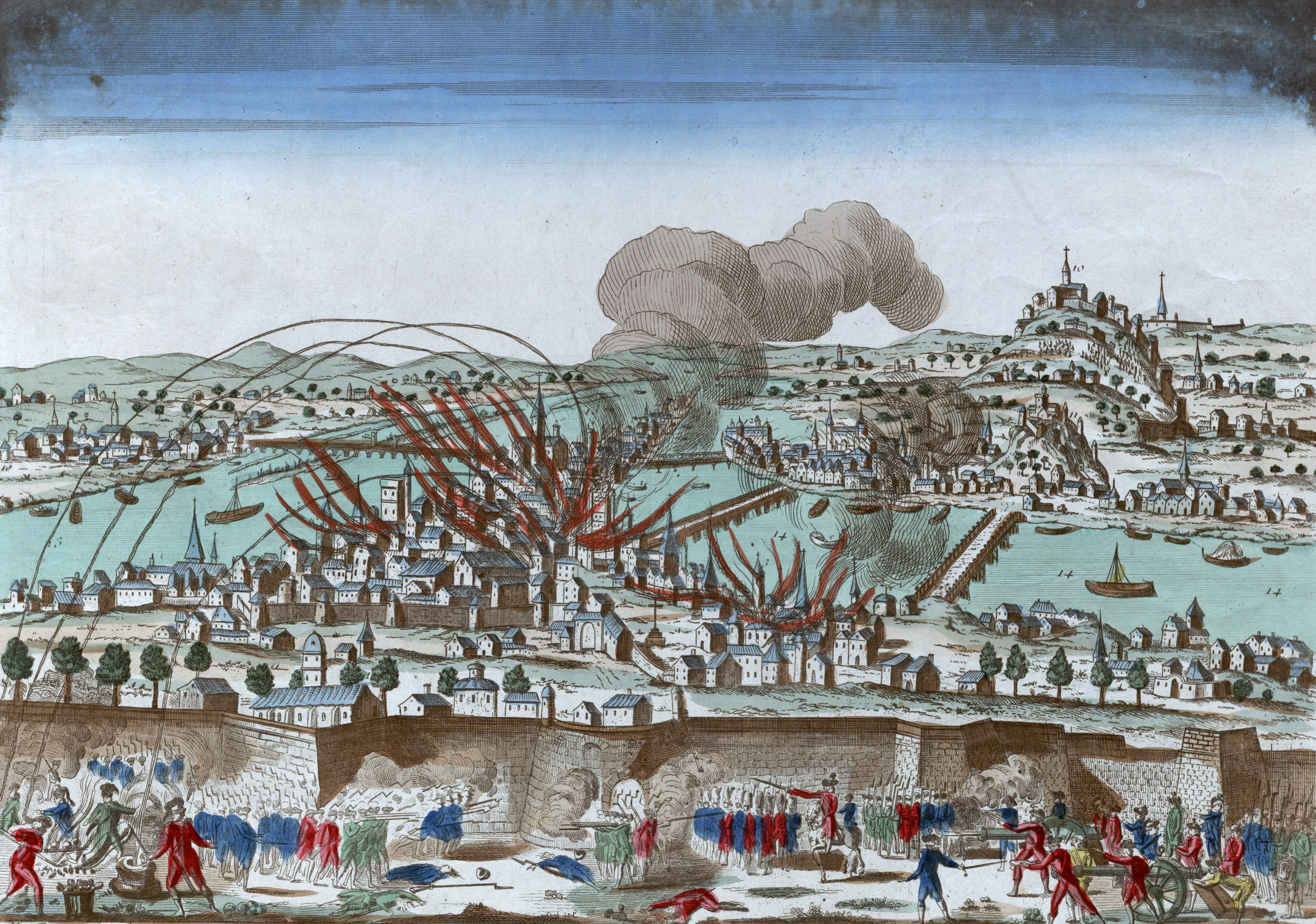
Lyon under siege in 1793

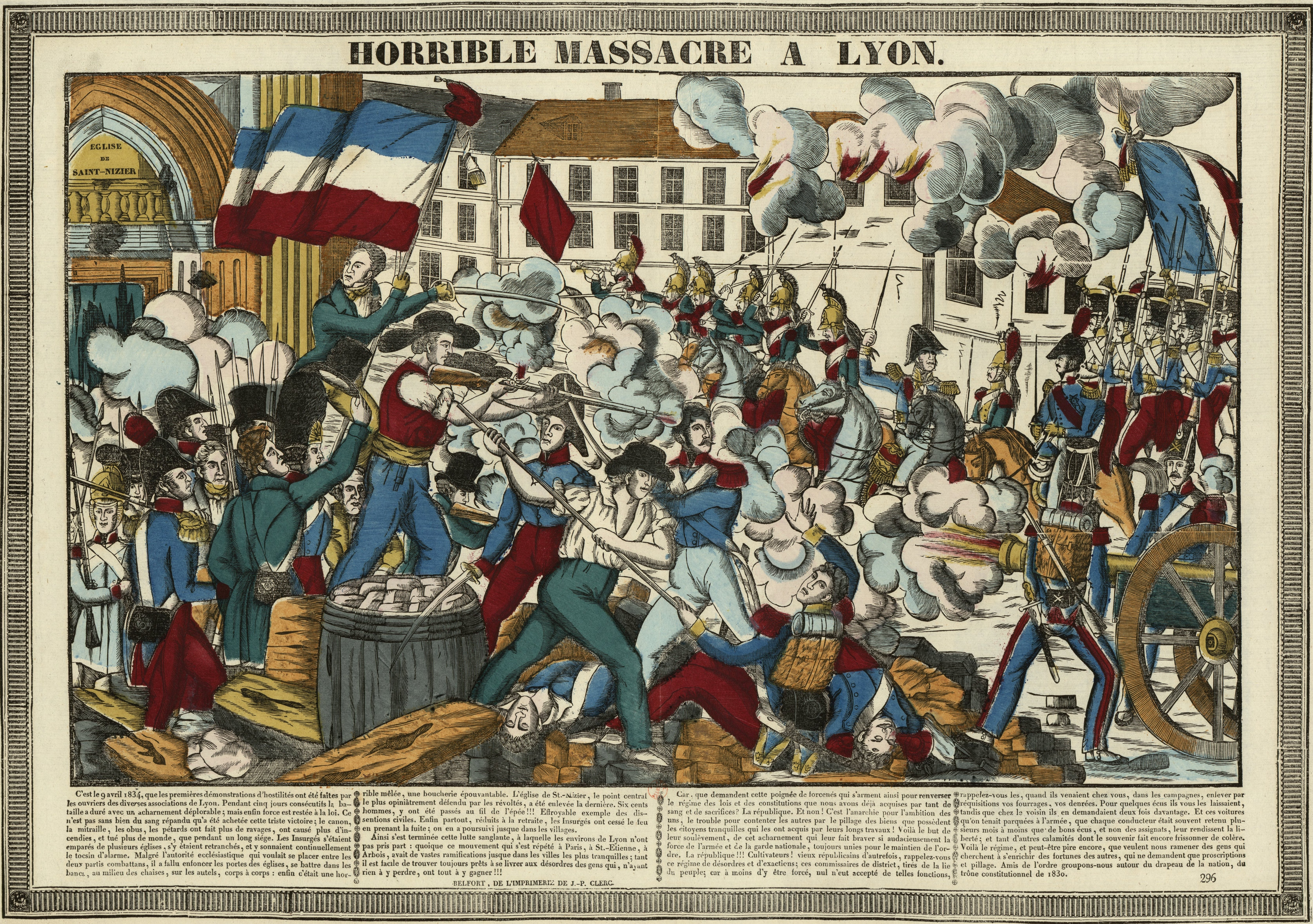
Massacre during the Canut rebellion of 1834

In 1572, Lyon was a scene of mass violence by Catholics against Protestant Huguenots in the St. Bartholomew's Day Massacre.

Two centuries later, Lyon was again convulsed by violence during the French Revolution, when the citizenry rose up against the National Convention and supported the Girondins. The city was besieged by Revolutionary armies for over two months before it surrendered in October 1793. Many buildings were destroyed, especially around the Place Bellecour, and Jean-Marie Collot d'Herbois and Joseph Fouché administered the execution of more than 2,000 people. The Convention ordered that its name be changed to "Liberated City", and a plaque was erected that proclaimed "Lyon made war on Liberty; Lyon no longer exists."

In 1797, days after the Coup of 18 Fructidor, a French Directory commissioner was assassinated in Lyon.

Napoleon ordered the reconstruction of buildings demolished during the Revolution.

=== 19th century ===
The city became an important industrial town in the 19th century. In 1831 and 1834, the canuts (silk workers) of Lyon staged two major uprisings for better working conditions and pay. In 1862, the first of Lyon's extensive network of funicular railways began operation. During the repression of January and February 1894, the police conducted at least dozens of raids targeting the anarchists living there, without much success. Some months later, in June 1894, companion Sante Caserio assassinated the French president responsible for the repression, Sadi Carnot.

=== 20th century to today ===
During World War II, Lyon was a centre for the occupying Nazi forces, including Klaus Barbie, the infamous "Butcher of Lyon". The city was also a stronghold of the French Resistance; the many secret passages known as traboules enabled people to escape Gestapo raids. On 3 September 1944, Lyon was liberated by the 1st Free French Division and the Forces Françaises de l'Intérieur. The city is now home to a Resistance museum.

== Geography ==
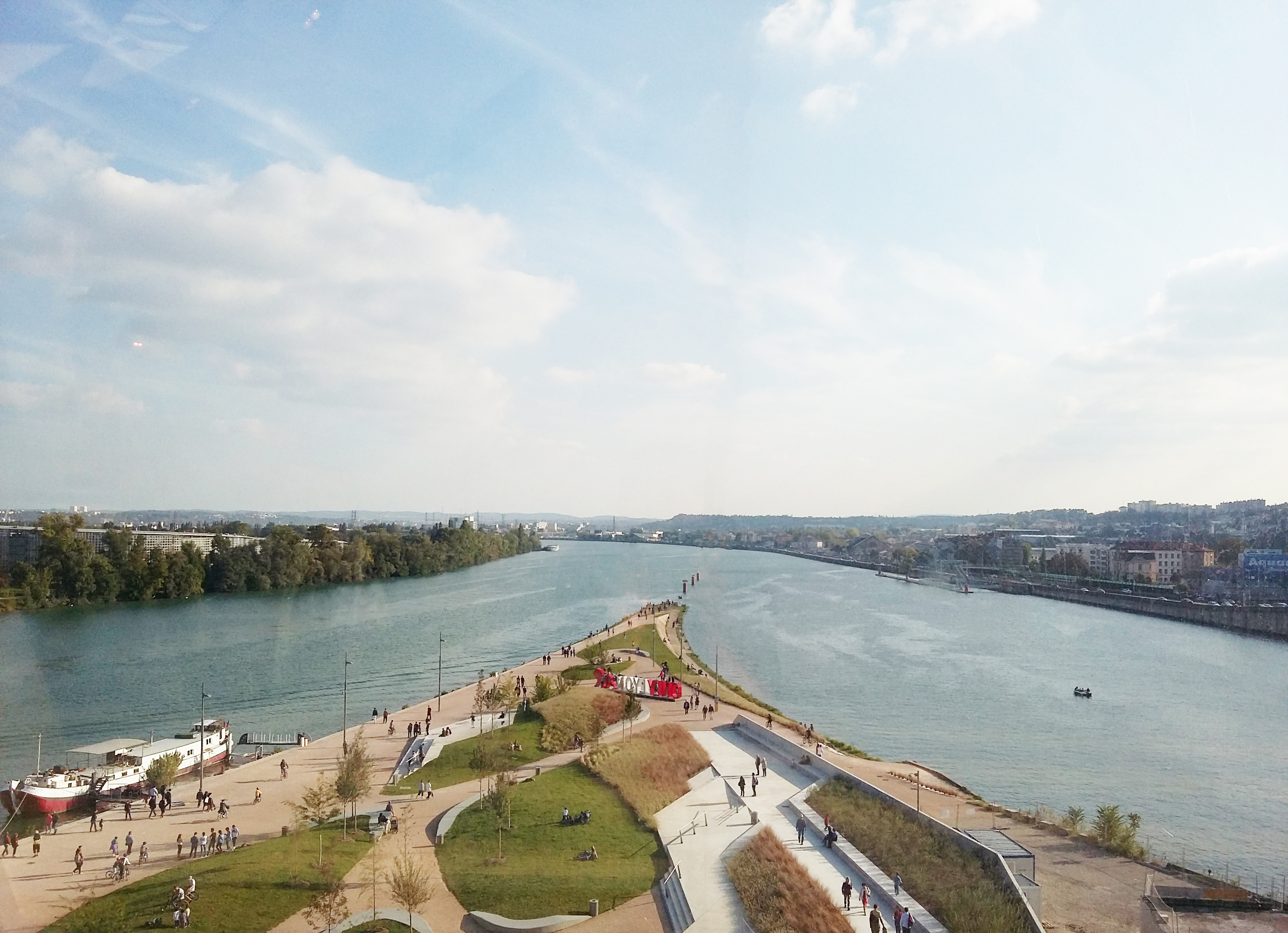
The Saône-Rhône confluence

The Rhône and Saône converge to the south of the historic city centre, forming a peninsula – the "Presqu'île" – bounded by two large hills to the west and north and a large plain eastward.

The western hill is Fourvière, known as "the hill that prays" because it is the location for Basilica of Notre-Dame de Fourvière, several convents, and Archbishop's residence. The northern hill is La Croix-Rousse, known as "the hill that works" because it is traditionally home to many small silk workshops, an industry for which the city has long been renowned.

On the Presqu'île is Place Bellecour, the third-largest public square in France. The broad, pedestrian-only Rue de la République leads north from Place Bellecour.

The district, Vieux Lyon, also hosts the Tour métallique (a highly visible TV tower, replicating the last stage of the Eiffel Tower) and one of the city's railways. Fourvière, along with portions of the Presqu'île and much of La Croix-Rousse, is designated as a UNESCO World Heritage Site.

East of the Rhône from the Presqu'île is a large flat area upon which sits much of modern Lyon and contains most of the city's population. Situated in this area is La Part-Dieu urban centre, which clusters the landmark structures Tour To-Lyon, Tour Incity, Tour Part-Dieu, Tour Oxygène, and Tour Swiss Life, as well as the city's primary railway station, Gare de Lyon-Part-Dieu.

North of this district lays the sixth arrondissement, which is home to one of Europe's largest urban parks, the Parc de la Tête d'or, as well as Lycée du Parc and Interpol's world headquarters.

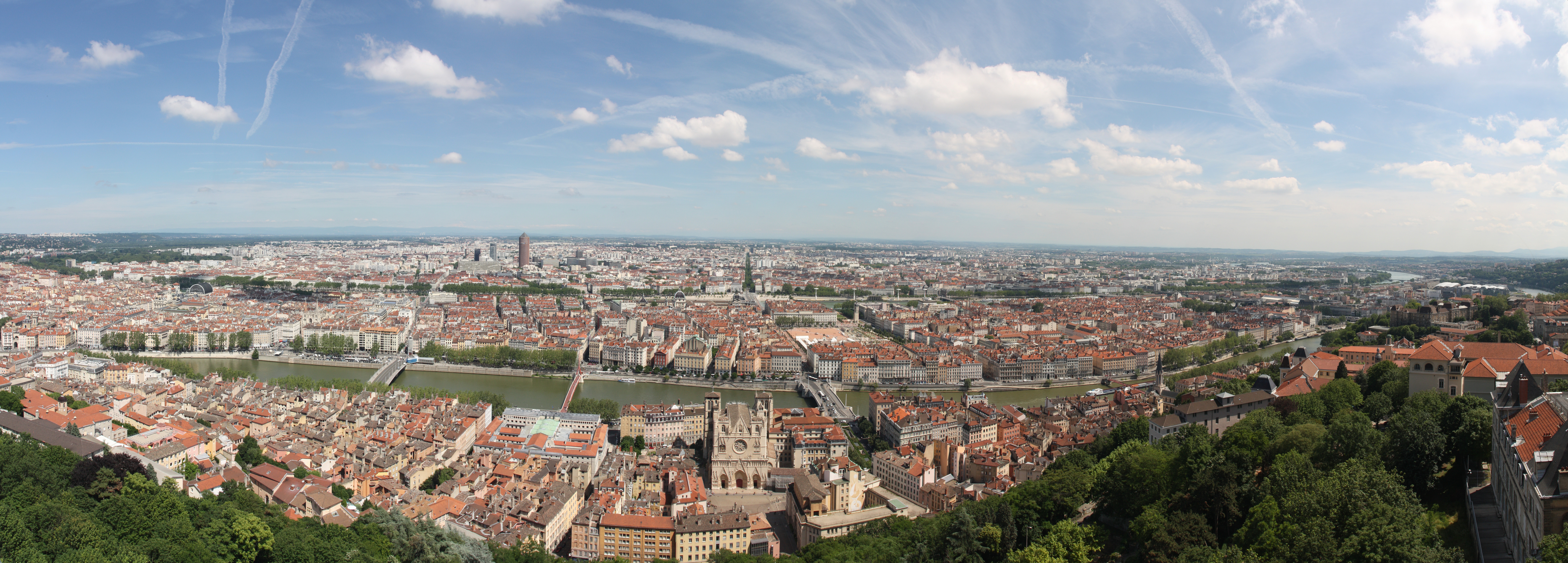
Panorama of the inner city of Lyon, taken from the basilica of Notre-Dame de Fourvière's roof

=== Climate ===
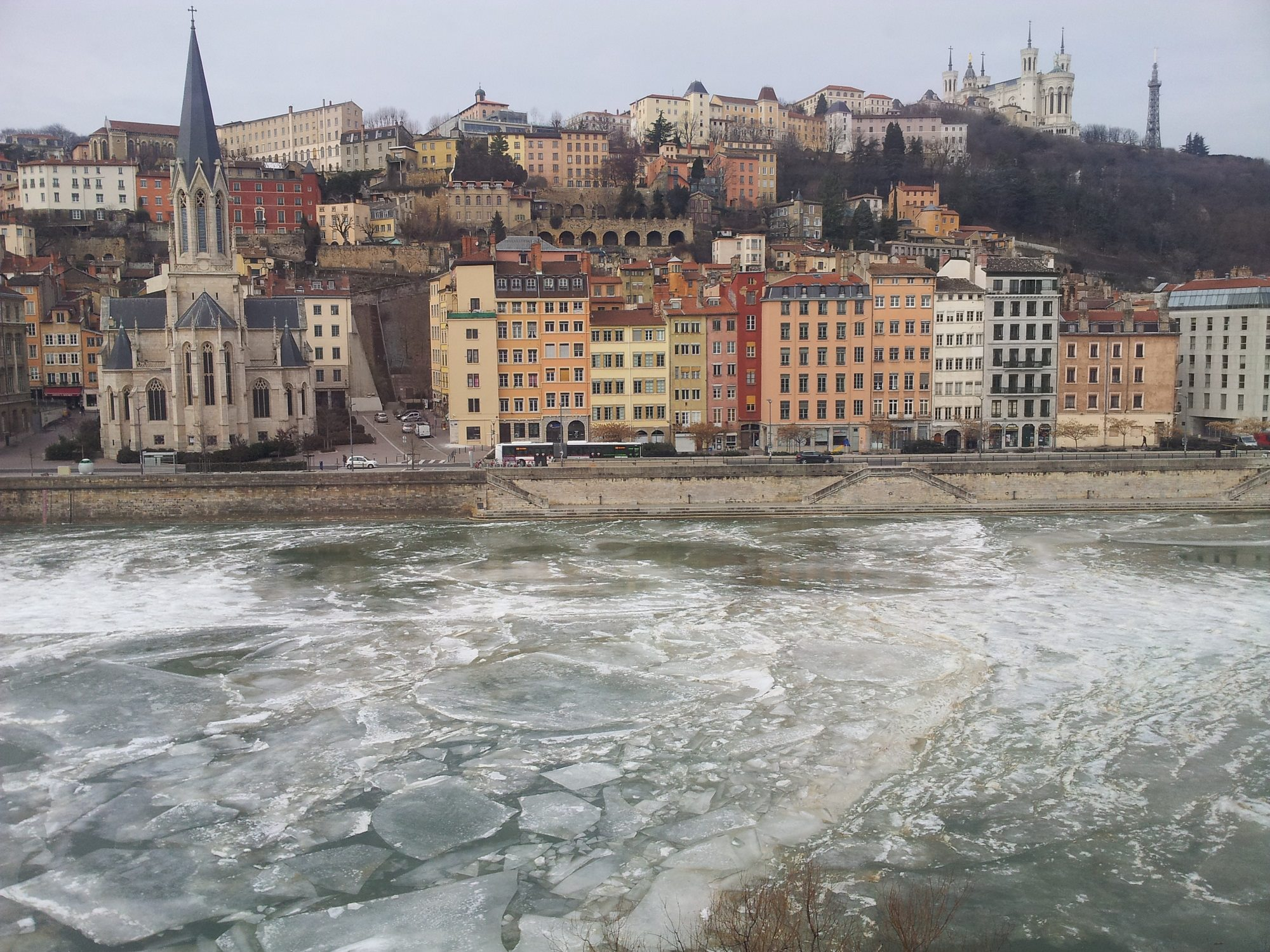
Ice on the Saône, 2012

Lyon has a humid subtropical climate (Köppen: Cfa). The mean temperature in Lyon in the coldest month is 4.1 °C (39.4 °F) in January and in the warmest month in July is 22.6 °C (72.7 °F). Precipitation is adequate year-round, at an average of 820 mm (32.3 in); the winter months are the driest. The highest recorded temperature was 41.4 °C (106.5 °F) on 24 August 2023 while the lowest recorded temperature was −24.6 °C (−12.3 °F) on 22 December 1938.

Climate data for Lyon - Bron (LYN), elevation: 202 m (663 ft) (1991–2020 normals, extremes 1920–present)
Month	Jan	Feb	Mar	Apr	May	Jun	Jul	Aug	Sep	Oct	Nov	Dec	Year
Record high °C (°F)	19.1 (66.4)	21.9 (71.4)	26.0 (78.8)	30.1 (86.2)	34.2 (93.6)	39.0 (102.2)	40.4 (104.7)	41.4 (106.5)	35.8 (96.4)	30.6 (87.1)	23.0 (73.4)	20.2 (68.4)	41.4 (106.5)
Mean daily maximum °C (°F)	7.1 (44.8)	9.0 (48.2)	13.8 (56.8)	17.4 (63.3)	21.5 (70.7)	25.6 (78.1)	28.2 (82.8)	28.0 (82.4)	23.1 (73.6)	17.7 (63.9)	11.4 (52.5)	7.7 (45.9)	17.5 (63.5)
Daily mean °C (°F)	4.1 (39.4)	5.2 (41.4)	9.0 (48.2)	12.3 (54.1)	16.3 (61.3)	20.3 (68.5)	22.6 (72.7)	22.3 (72.1)	17.9 (64.2)	13.7 (56.7)	8.1 (46.6)	4.8 (40.6)	13.0 (55.4)
Mean daily minimum °C (°F)	1.1 (34.0)	1.4 (34.5)	4.2 (39.6)	7.2 (45.0)	11.2 (52.2)	15.0 (59.0)	17.0 (62.6)	16.6 (61.9)	12.8 (55.0)	9.6 (49.3)	4.9 (40.8)	2.0 (35.6)	8.6 (47.5)
Record low °C (°F)	−23.0 (−9.4)	−22.5 (−8.5)	−10.5 (13.1)	−4.4 (24.1)	−3.8 (25.2)	2.3 (36.1)	6.1 (43.0)	4.6 (40.3)	0.2 (32.4)	−4.5 (23.9)	−9.4 (15.1)	−24.6 (−12.3)	−24.6 (−12.3)
Average precipitation mm (inches)	49.8 (1.96)	41.6 (1.64)	49.4 (1.94)	68.9 (2.71)	80.9 (3.19)	74.1 (2.92)	67.4 (2.65)	65.5 (2.58)	82.5 (3.25)	99.8 (3.93)	87.2 (3.43)	53.7 (2.11)	820.8 (32.31)
Average precipitation days (≥ 1.0 mm)	8.1	7.9	8.4	9.0	10.3	8.5	7.5	7.2	7.3	9.9	9.4	9.2	102.8
Average relative humidity (%)	82	75	67	63	64	61	58	61	68	77	82	83	70
Average dew point °C (°F)	1 (34)	1 (34)	3 (37)	5 (41)	9 (48)	12 (54)	13 (55)	14 (57)	11 (52)	9 (48)	5 (41)	2 (36)	7 (45)
Mean monthly sunshine hours	71.1	102.4	173.7	197.7	223.8	256.5	288.1	263.1	204.1	131.4	78.9	58.7	2,049.5
Source 1: Meteociel
Source 2: Time and Date

Climate data for Lyon (LYN), elevation: 201 m, 1961–1990 normals and extremes
Month	Jan	Feb	Mar	Apr	May	Jun	Jul	Aug	Sep	Oct	Nov	Dec	Year
Record high °C (°F)	16.3 (61.3)	21.4 (70.5)	25.7 (78.3)	28.0 (82.4)	29.4 (84.9)	34.4 (93.9)	39.8 (103.6)	37.1 (98.8)	33.8 (92.8)	28.4 (83.1)	22.6 (72.7)	20.2 (68.4)	39.8 (103.6)
Mean maximum °C (°F)	10.2 (50.4)	14.4 (57.9)	15.9 (60.6)	18.6 (65.5)	23.1 (73.6)	28.8 (83.8)	32.8 (91.0)	28.1 (82.6)	27.3 (81.1)	19.7 (67.5)	14.1 (57.4)	9.5 (49.1)	32.8 (91.0)
Mean daily maximum °C (°F)	6.1 (43.0)	8.2 (46.8)	11.6 (52.9)	15.2 (59.4)	19.1 (66.4)	22.9 (73.2)	26.1 (79.0)	26.0 (78.8)	22.4 (72.3)	17.1 (62.8)	10.0 (50.0)	6.4 (43.5)	15.9 (60.7)
Daily mean °C (°F)	3.0 (37.4)	4.9 (40.8)	7.4 (45.3)	10.2 (50.4)	14.0 (57.2)	17.6 (63.7)	20.6 (69.1)	20.0 (68.0)	17.1 (62.8)	12.7 (54.9)	6.7 (44.1)	3.9 (39.0)	11.5 (52.7)
Mean daily minimum °C (°F)	0.2 (32.4)	1.4 (34.5)	2.9 (37.2)	5.2 (41.4)	9.1 (48.4)	12.5 (54.5)	14.8 (58.6)	14.4 (57.9)	11.7 (53.1)	8.3 (46.9)	3.5 (38.3)	0.7 (33.3)	7.1 (44.7)
Mean minimum °C (°F)	−7.0 (19.4)	−4.7 (23.5)	−1.4 (29.5)	3.2 (37.8)	7.6 (45.7)	10.9 (51.6)	13.1 (55.6)	12.9 (55.2)	8.1 (46.6)	4.5 (40.1)	1.0 (33.8)	−4.7 (23.5)	−7.0 (19.4)
Record low °C (°F)	−23.0 (−9.4)	−19.3 (−2.7)	−10.5 (13.1)	−3.2 (26.2)	−0.3 (31.5)	3.6 (38.5)	6.1 (43.0)	5.2 (41.4)	1.9 (35.4)	−3.2 (26.2)	−7.1 (19.2)	−16.0 (3.2)	−23.0 (−9.4)
Average precipitation mm (inches)	54.0 (2.13)	53.8 (2.12)	72.2 (2.84)	56.1 (2.21)	72.6 (2.86)	73.2 (2.88)	54.5 (2.15)	71.6 (2.82)	53.2 (2.09)	56.2 (2.21)	68.0 (2.68)	55.8 (2.20)	741.2 (29.19)
Average precipitation days (≥ 1.0 mm)	10.4	9.3	9.7	9.6	10.9	8.2	6.8	8.2	7.3	8.5	8.9	9.8	107.6
Average snowy days	5.5	3.9	2.5	1.1	0.0	0.0	0.0	0.0	0.0	0.0	2.0	4.6	19.6
Average relative humidity (%)	84	80	74	71	72	70	65	70	76	82	84	86	76
Mean monthly sunshine hours	62.6	89.8	147.5	184.2	215.9	250.9	292.6	259.0	208.1	134.3	75.3	55.4	1,975.6
Percentage possible sunshine	23	31	41	46	47	54	62	60	56	40	27	21	42
Source 1: NOAA
Source 2: Infoclimat.fr (humidity)

== Administration ==
=== Commune ===
Map of the City of Lyon divided into 9 arrondissements

Like Paris and Marseille, the commune (municipality) of Lyon is divided into a number of municipal arrondissements, each of which is identified by a number and has its own council and town hall. Five arrondissements were originally created in 1852, when three neighbouring communes (La Croix-Rousse, La Guillotière, and Vaise) were annexed by Lyon. Between 1867 and 1959, the third arrondissement (which originally covered the whole of the Left Bank of the Rhône) was split three times, creating a new arrondissement in each case. Then, in 1963, the commune of Saint-Rambert-l'Île-Barbe was annexed to Lyon's fifth arrondissement. A year later, in 1964, the fifth was split to create Lyon's 9th – and, to date, final – arrondissement. Within each arrondissement, the recognisable quartiers or neighbourhoods are:

- 1st arrondissement: Slopes of La Croix-Rousse, Terreaux, Martinière/St-Vincent
- 2nd arrondissement: Cordeliers, Bellecour, Ainay, Perrache, Confluence, Sainte-Blandine
- 3rd arrondissement: Guillotière (north), Préfecture, Part-Dieu, Villette, Dauphiné/Sans Souci, Montchat, Grange Blanche (north), Monplaisir (north)
- 4th arrondissement: Plateau de la Croix-Rousse, Serin
- 5th arrondissement: Vieux Lyon (Saint-Paul, Saint-Jean, Saint-Georges), Saint-Just, Saint-Irénée, Fourvière, Point du Jour, Ménival, Battières, Champvert (south)
- 6th arrondissement: Brotteaux, Bellecombe, Parc de la Tête d'or, Cité Internationale
- 7th arrondissement: Guillotière (south), Jean Macé, Gerland
- 8th arrondissement: Monplaisir (south), Bachut, États-Unis, Grand Trou/Moulin à Vent, Grange Blanche (south), Laënnec, Mermoz, Monplaisir-la-Plaine
- 9th arrondissement: Vaise, Duchère, Rochecardon, St-Rambert-l'Île-Barbe, Gorge de Loup, Observance, Champvert (north)

Geographically, Lyon's two main rivers, the Saône and the Rhône, divide the arrondissements into three groups:

- To the west of the Saône, the fifth arrondissement covers the old city of Vieux Lyon, Fourvière hill and the plateau beyond. The 9th is immediately to the north, and stretches from Gorge de Loup, through Vaise to the neighbouring suburbs of Écully, Champagne-au-Mont-d'Or, Saint-Didier-au-Mont-d'Or, Saint-Cyr-au-Mont-d'Or and Collonges-au-Mont-d'Or.
- Between the two rivers, on the Presqu'île, are the second, first, and fourth arrondissements. The second includes most of the city centre, Bellecour and Perrache railway station, and reaches as far as the confluence of the two rivers. The first is directly to the north of the second and covers part of the city centre (including the Hôtel de Ville) and the slopes of La Croix-Rousse. To the north of the Boulevard is the fourth arrondissement, which covers the Plateau of La Croix-Rousse, up to its boundary with the commune of Caluire-et-Cuire.
- To the east of the Rhône, are the third, sixth, seventh, and eighth arrondissements.

==== Mayors ====
This is a list of mayors of the commune of Lyon since the end of the 19th century.

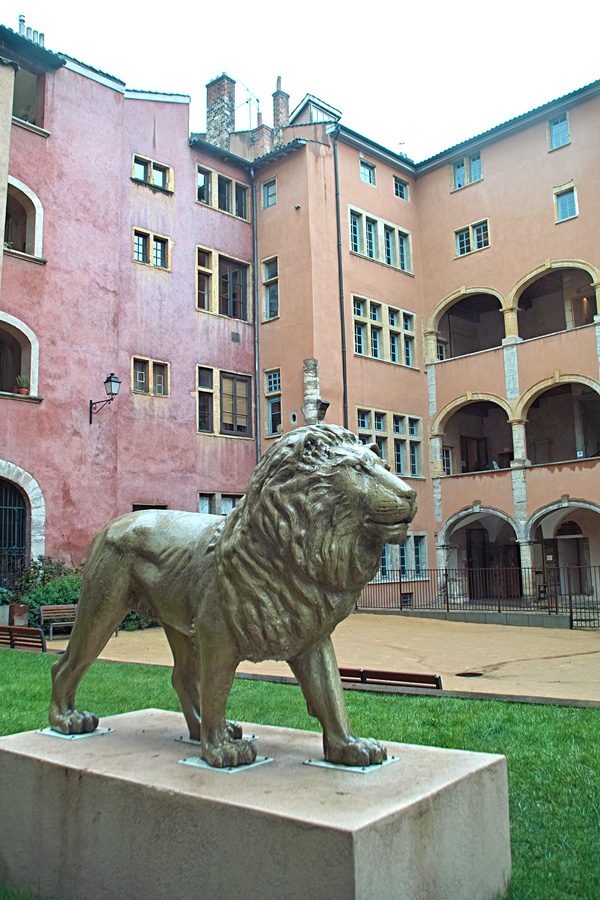
The lion, symbol of the city, on display at Maison des avocats

Mayor	Term start	Term end	Party
Antoine Gailleton	1881	1900	
Victor Augagneur	1900	30 October 1905	PRS
Édouard Herriot	30 October 1905	20 September 1940	Radical
Georges Cohendy	20 September 1940	1941	Nominated and dismissed by Vichy
Georges Villiers	1941	1942	Nominated and dismissed by Vichy
Pierre-Louis-André Bertrand	1942	1944	Nominated by Vichy
Justin Godart	1944	18 May 1945	Radical
Édouard Herriot	18 May 1945	26 March 1957	Radical
Pierre Montel, ad interim	26 March 1957	14 April 1957	Radical
Louis Pradel	14 April 1957	27 November 1976	DVD
Armand Tapernoux, ad interim	27 November 1976	5 December 1976	DVD
Francisque Collomb	5 December 1976	24 March 1989	DVD
Michel Noir	24 March 1989	25 June 1995	RPR
Raymond Barre	25 June 1995	25 March 2001	DVD
Gérard Collomb	25 March 2001	17 July 2017	PS
Georges Képénékian	17 July 2017	5 November 2018	LREM
Gérard Collomb	5 November 2018	4 July 2020	LREM
Grégory Doucet	4 July 2020	Incumbent	EELV

=== Metropolis ===
Map of the Metropolis of Lyon and its 59 communes (The commune of Lyon is in red.)

Map showing the 14 electoral wards of the Metropolis of Lyon

Since 2015, the commune of Lyon (48 km^{2}; 19 sq mi in land area) and 58 suburban communes have formed the Metropolis of Lyon (534 km^{2}; 206 sq mi in land area), a directly elected metropolitan authority now in charge of most urban issues. The Metropolis of Lyon is the only metropolitan authority in France which is a territorial collectivity, on par with French communes and departments. Its metropolitan council was for the first time directly elected by universal suffrage in 2020 within 14 electoral wards, the only directly elected metropolitan council in France.

The 14 electoral wards are the following (see map for location):

Lônes et coteaux
Lyon-Centre (Lyon-Centre)
Lyon-Est (Lyon-East)
Lyon-Nord (Lyon-North)
Lyon-Ouest
Lyon-Sud
Lyon-Sud-Est
Ouest
Plateau Nord-Caluire
Porte des Alpes
Portes du Sud
Rhône Amont
Val de Saône
Villeurbanne

The six wards with names starting with "Lyon" are all located within the commune of Lyon. The Villeurbanne ward is coterminous with the namesake commune. All other seven wards each group various suburban communes.

The division of the Metropolis of Lyon in large electoral wards often grouping various communes and dividing the commune of Lyon into six wards was criticized by the suburban mayors, as it ended the rule of 'one commune, one metropolitan councilor'. The goal of this electoral division of the metropolis was to focus metropolitan elections more on metropolitan issues than parochial communal issues, and ensure the 'one person, one vote' rule be respected, by creating electoral wards of more homogeneous population sizes. Opponents said it diluted the voice of the small suburban communes, which are now part of large electoral wards and do not each possess a representative in the metropolitan council anymore.

==== Presidents of the Metropolitan Council ====
The two first presidents of the Metropolis of Lyon's metropolitan council were chosen by indirectly elected metropolitan councilors. The current president since July 2020 was elected by new metropolitan councilors following their election by universal suffrage in March (1st round) and June (2nd round) 2020, the first direct election of a metropolitan council in France.

President of the Metropolitan Council	Term start	Term end	Party
Gérard Collomb	1 January 2015	10 July 2017	PS
David Kimelfeld	10 July 2017	2 July 2020	LREM
Bruno Bernard	2 July 2020	Incumbent	EELV

== Main sights ==
=== Antiquity ===
- The Roman ruins on the hillside near the Fourvière Basilica, with the Ancient Theatre of Fourvière, the Odeon of Lyon and the accompanying Gallo-Roman museum
- Amphitheatre of the Three Gauls – ruins of a Roman amphitheatre.
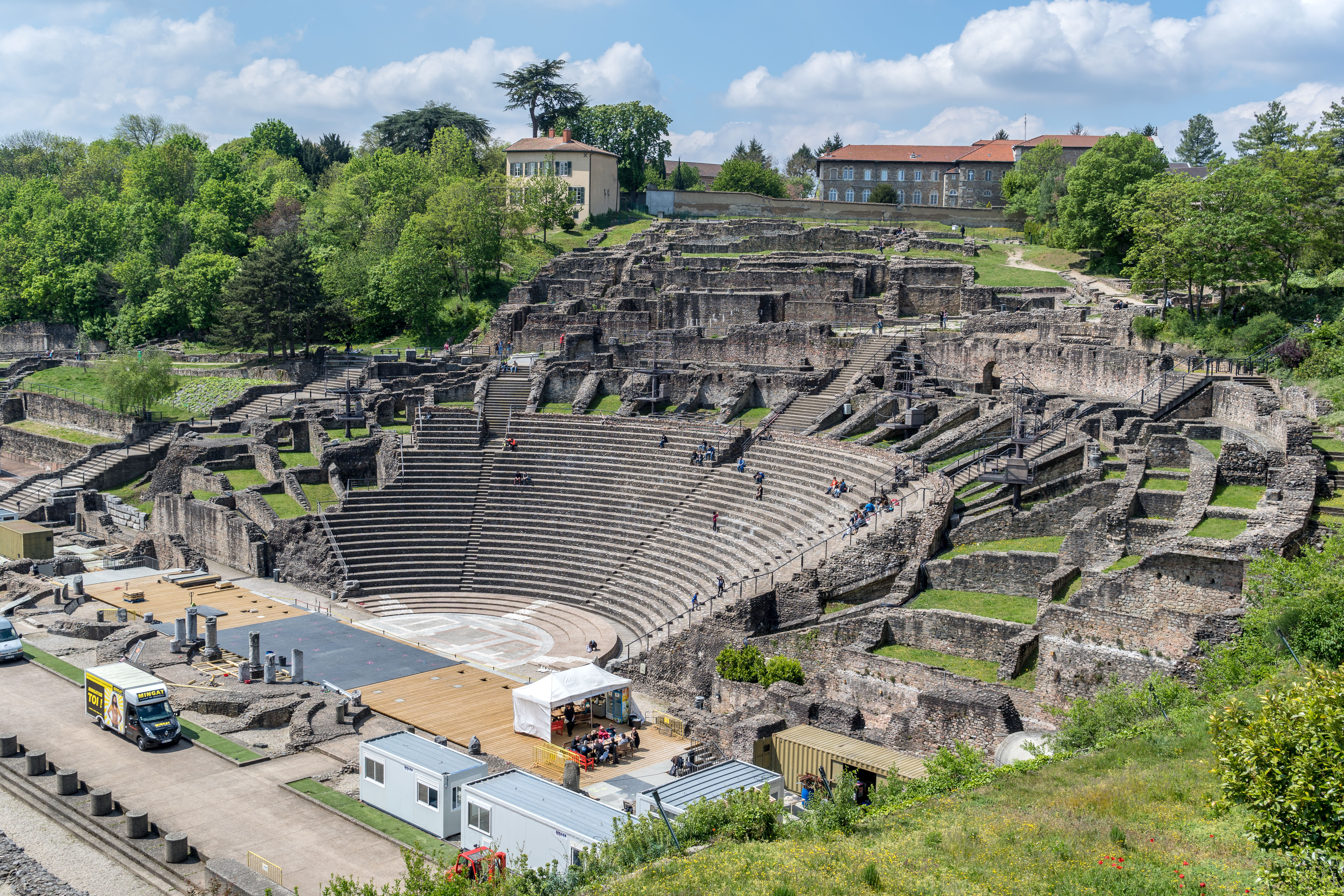
Ancient Theatre of Fourvière

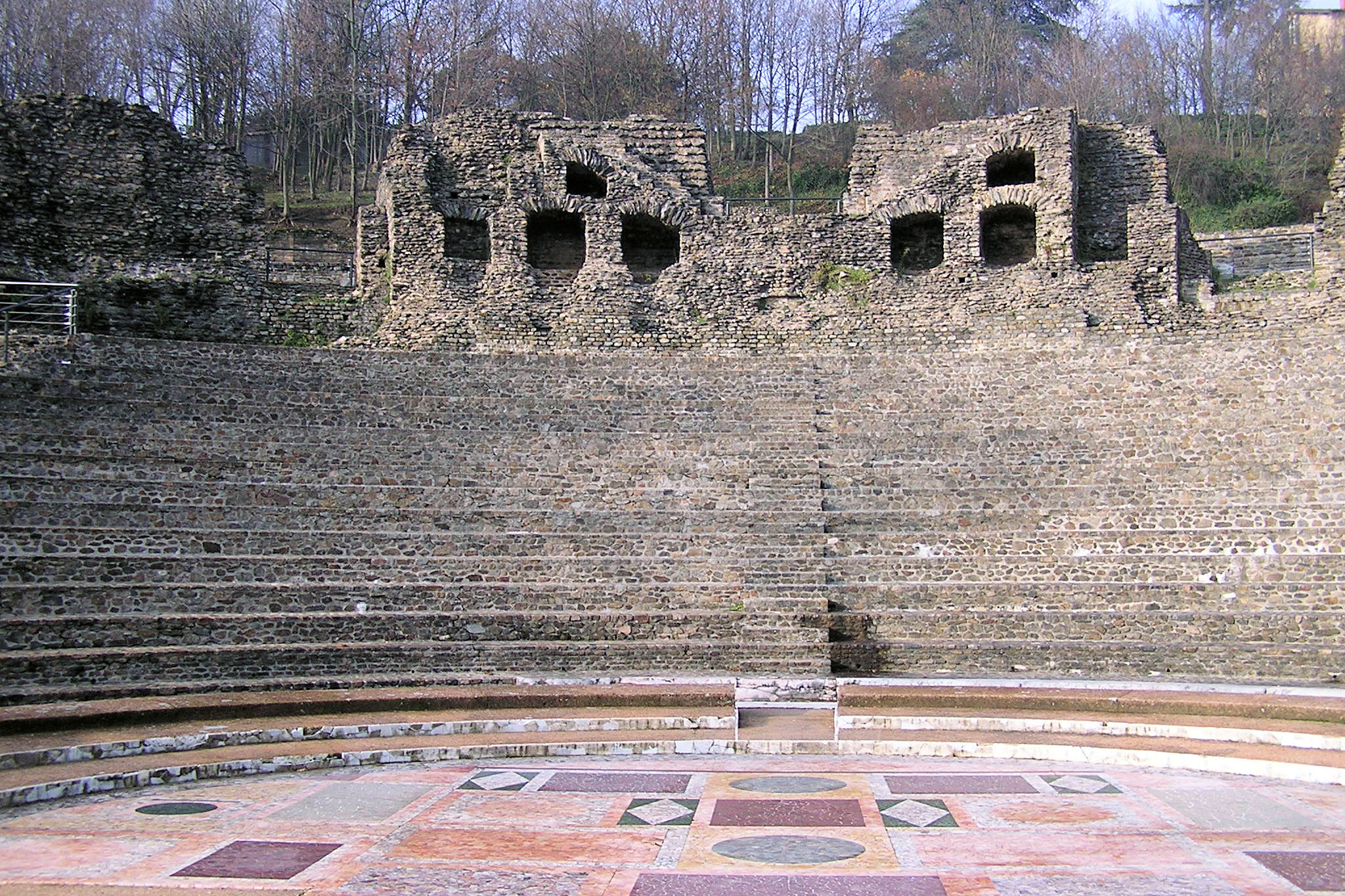
Odeon of Lyon

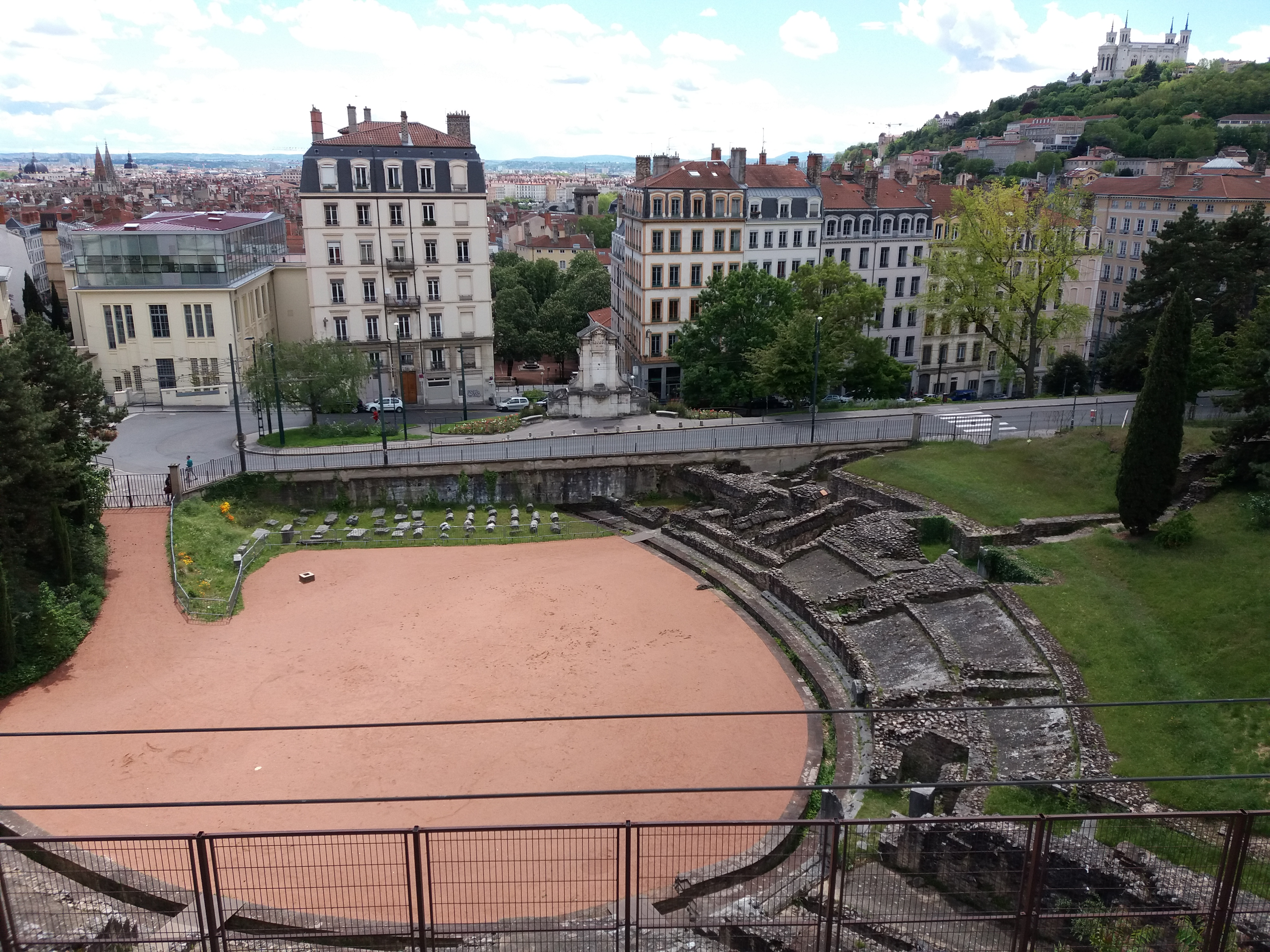
Amphitheatre of the Three Gauls

=== Middle Ages and Renaissance ===
- Cathedral of St. John, a medieval church with architectural elements of the 13th, 14th and 15th centuries, also the principal religious structure in the city and the seat of the Archbishop of Lyon
- Basilica of St-Martin-d'Ainay, one of the rare surviving Romanesque basilica-style churches in Lyon
- Église Saint-Paul, Romanesque (12th and 13th century) and Gothic (15th–16th century) church
- Église Saint-Bonaventure, 14th- and 15th-century Gothic church
- Église Saint-Nizier, Gothic church from the 15th century, having a doorway carved in the 16th century by Philibert Delorme
- Vieux Lyon (English: Old Lyon) area, Medieval and Renaissance quarter of the town, with shops, dining and cobbled streets
- The many Renaissance hôtels particuliers of the Old Lyon quarter, such as the Hôtel de Bullioud, were also built by Philibert Delorme
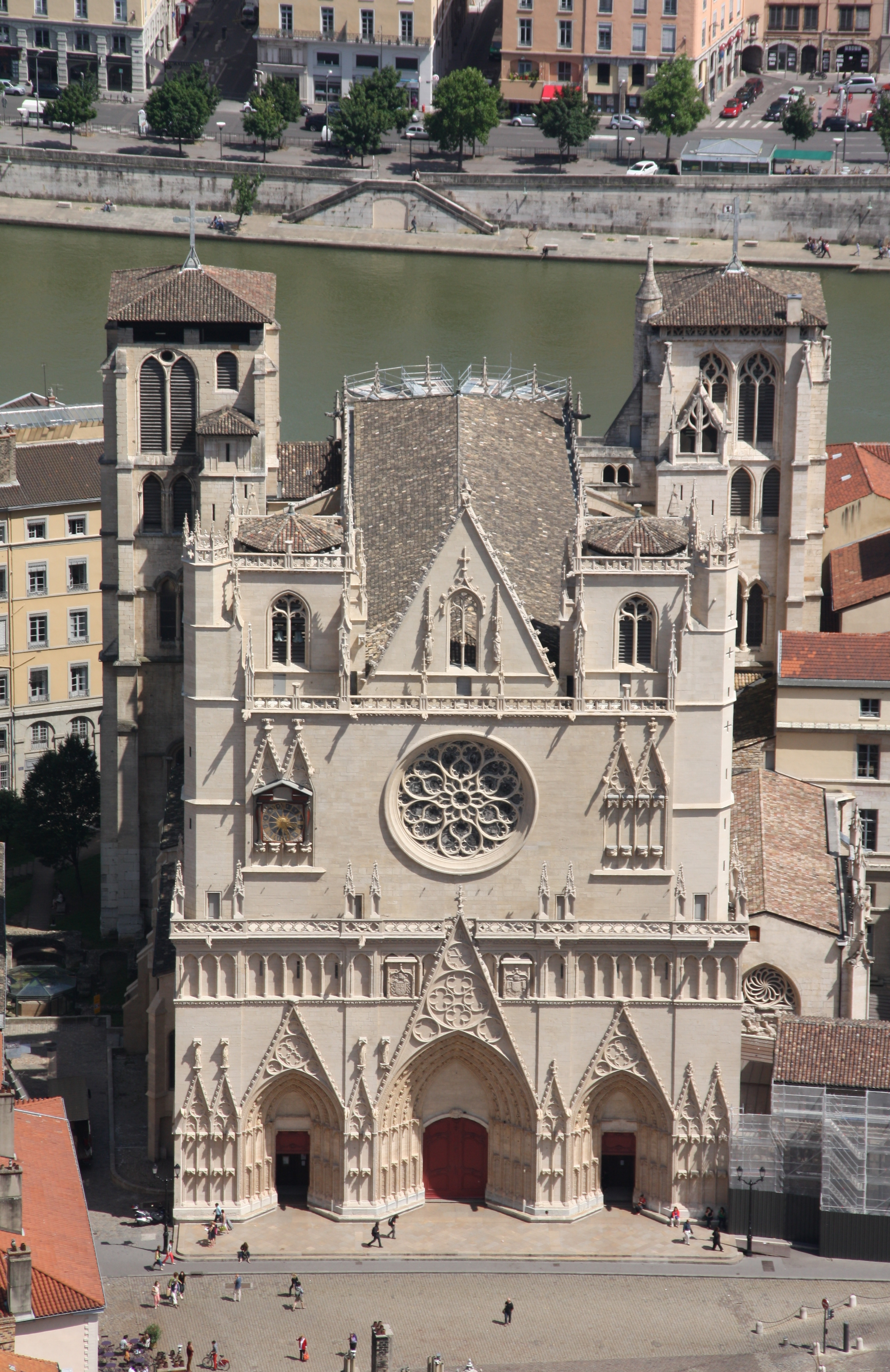
Lyon Cathedral

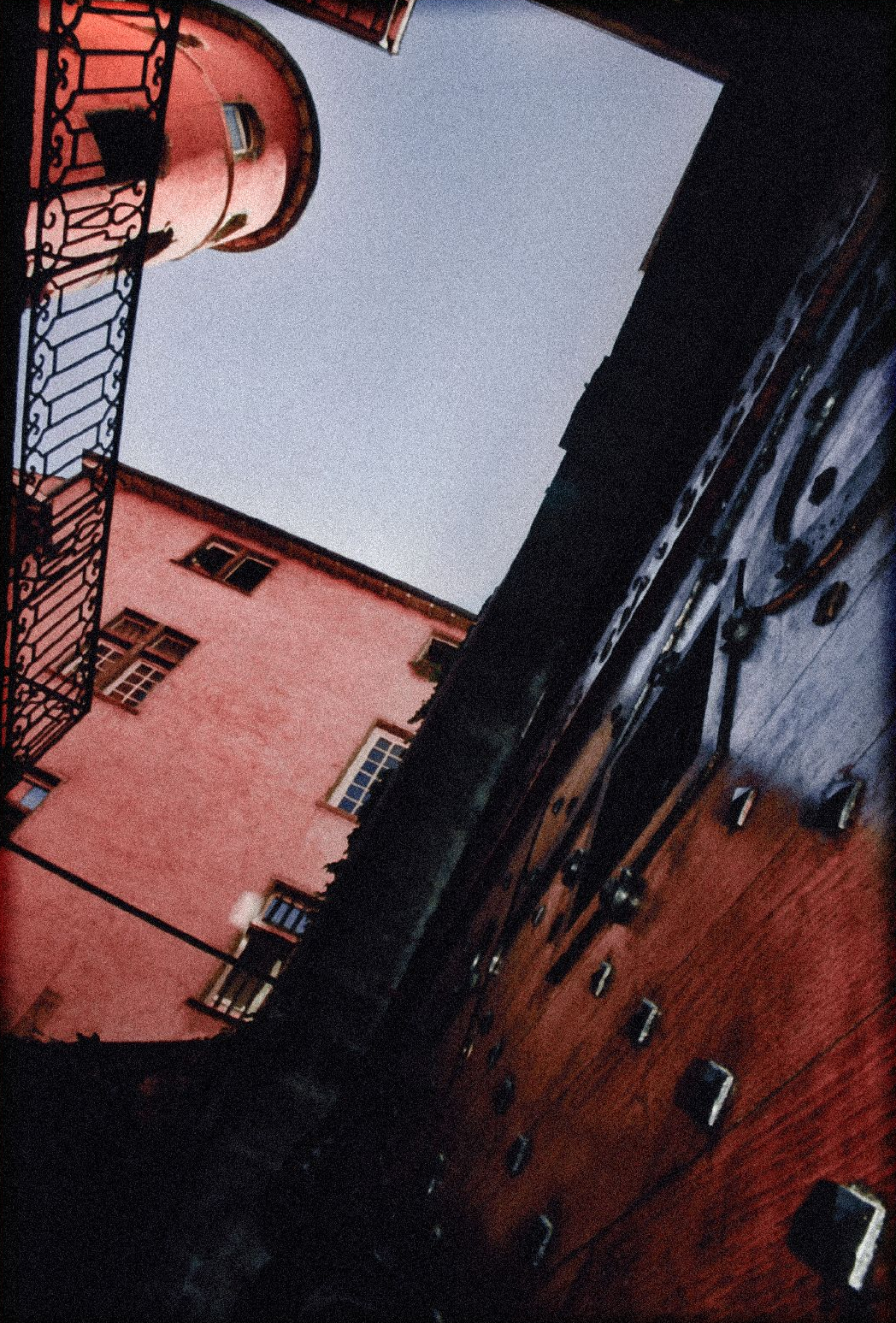
Maison du Crible (16th century) in the Vieux Lyon

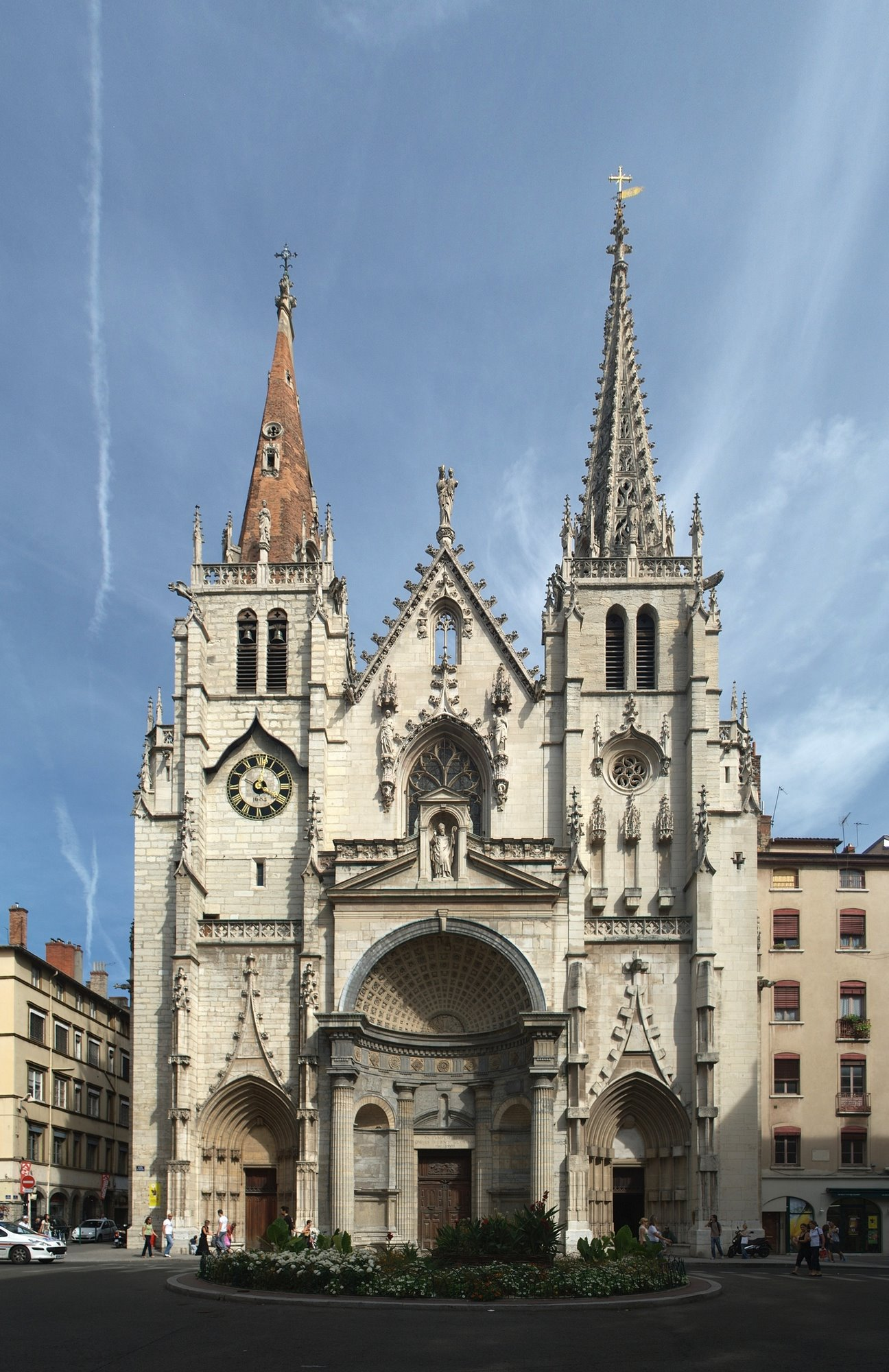
Saint-Nizier Church

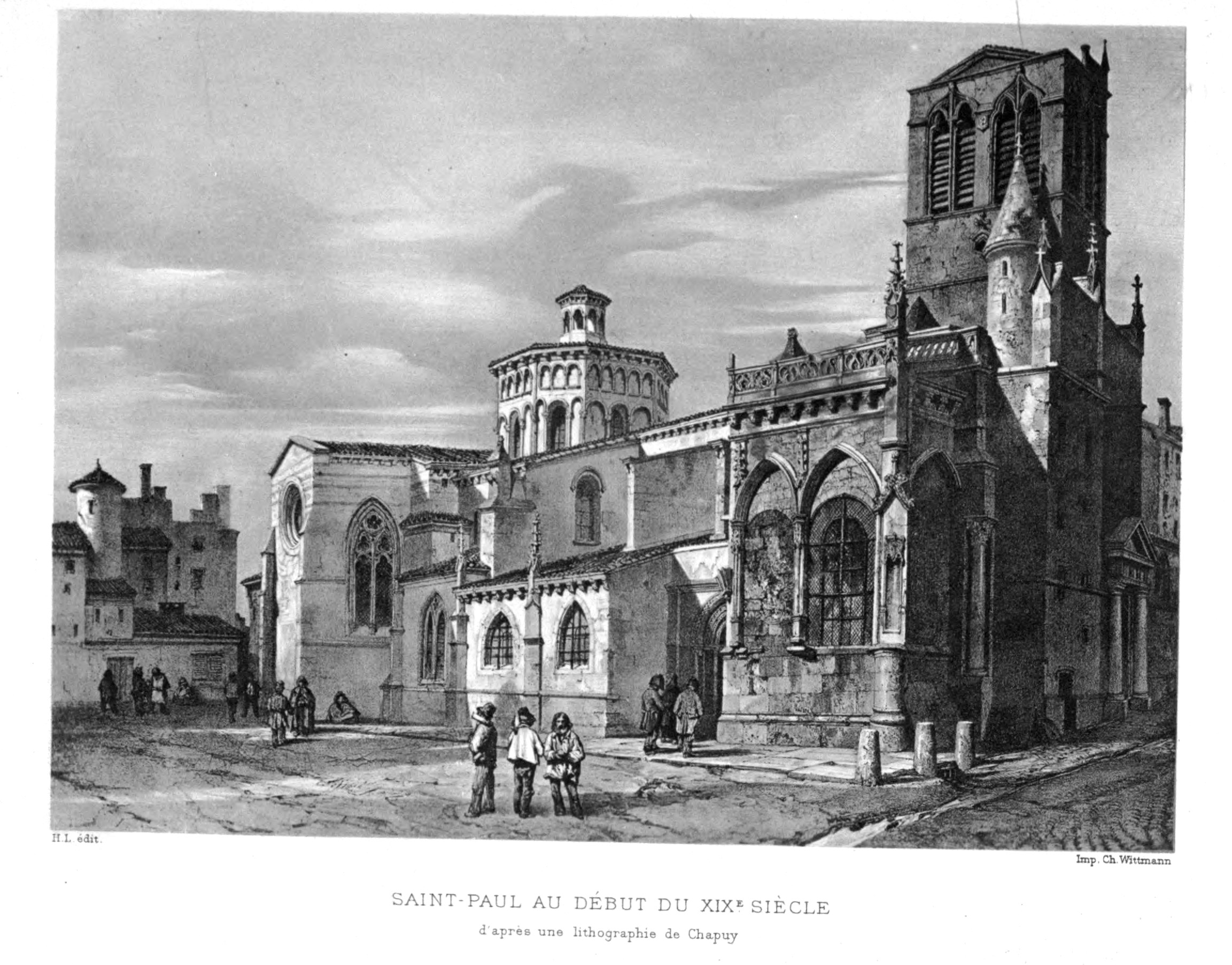
Église Saint-Paul

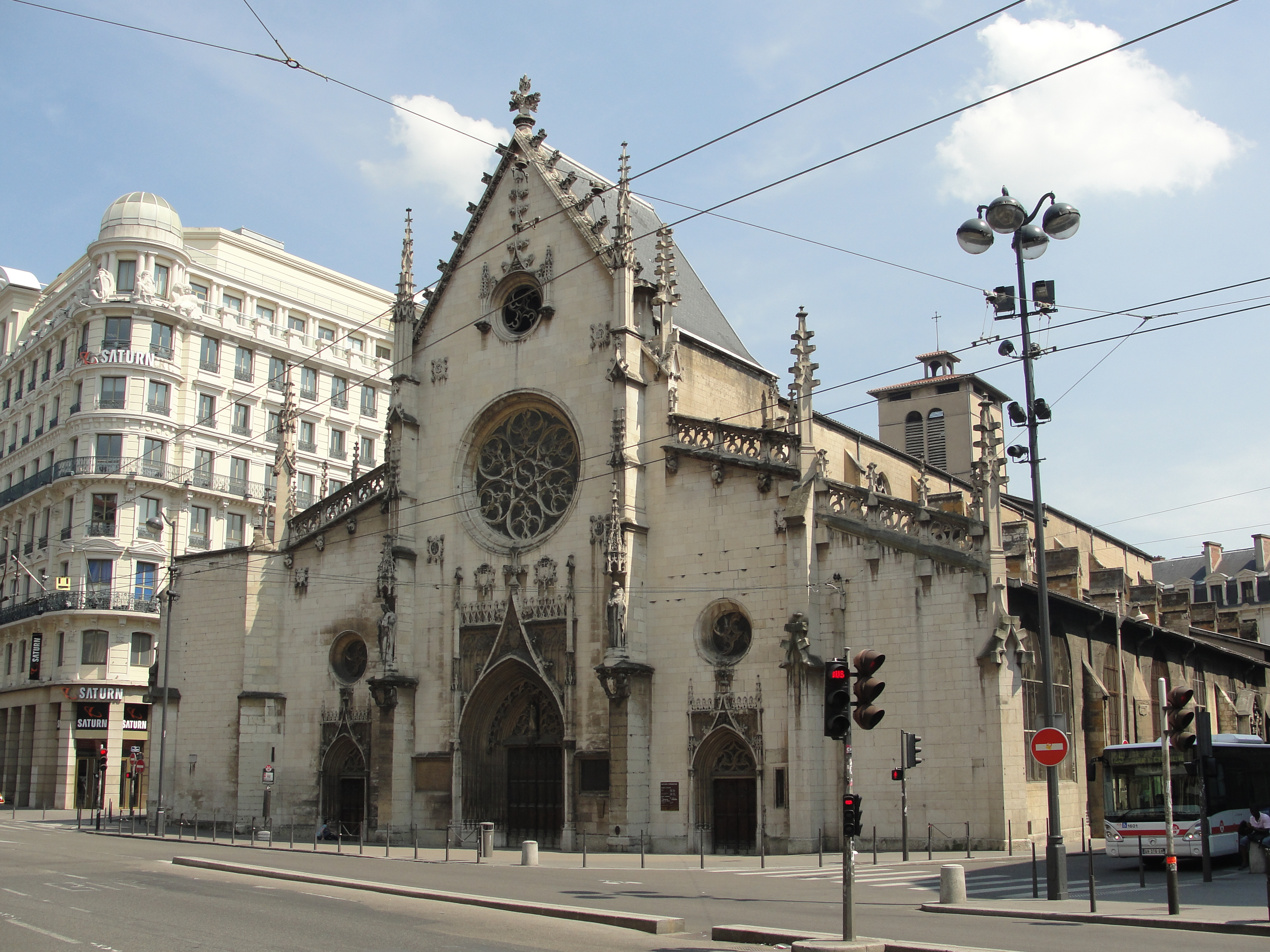
Église Saint-Bonaventure

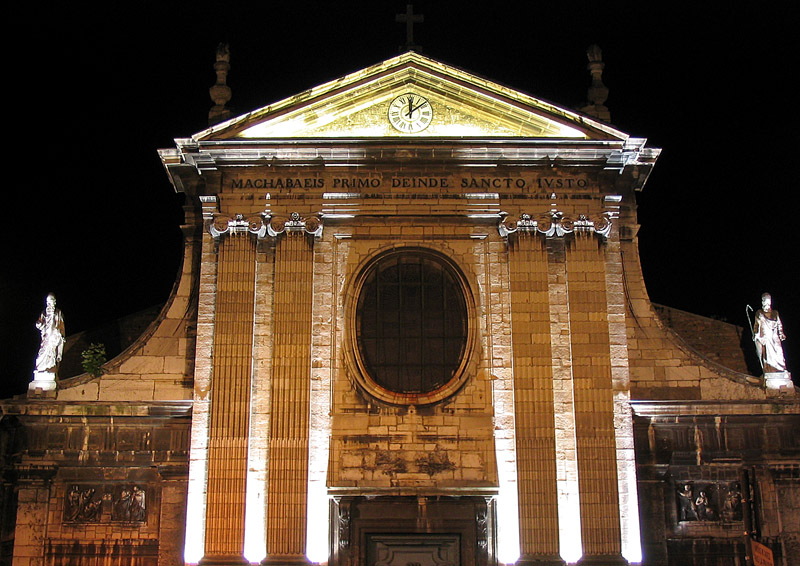
Church of Saint-Just, Lyon

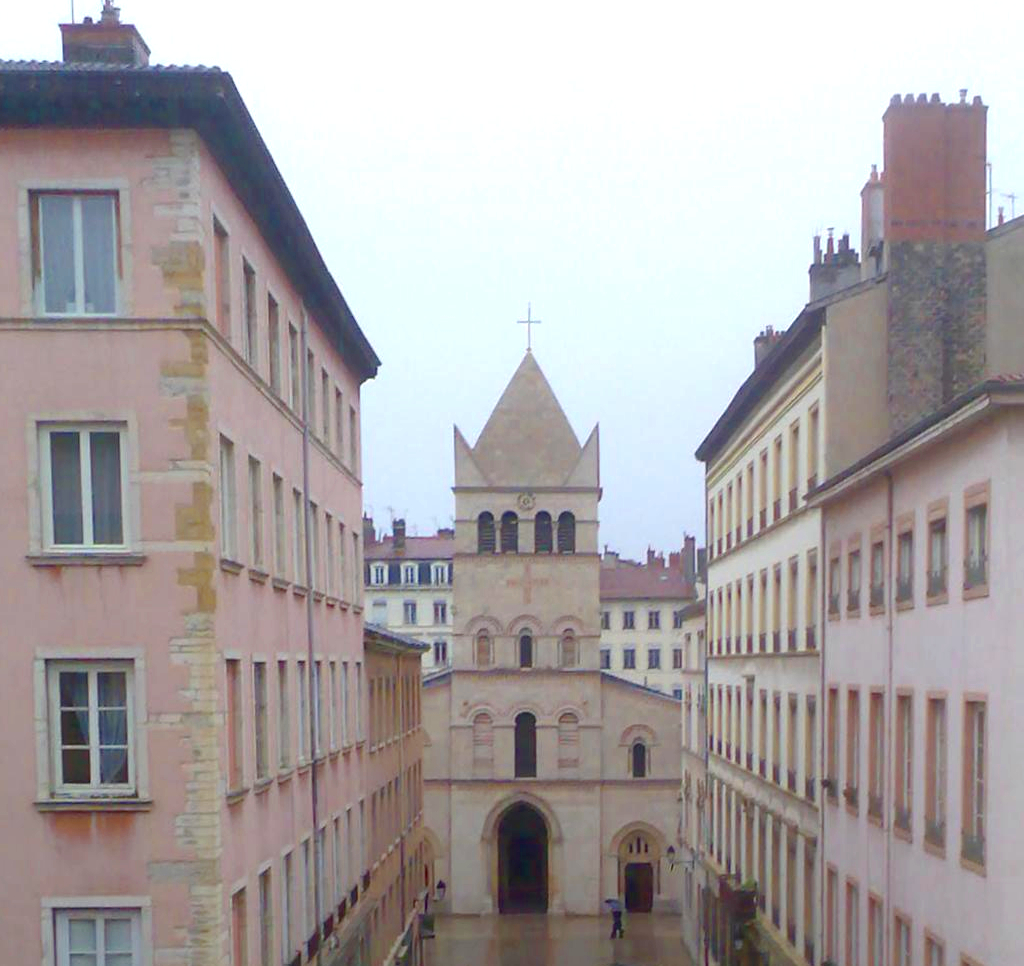
Basilica of Saint-Martin d'Ainay

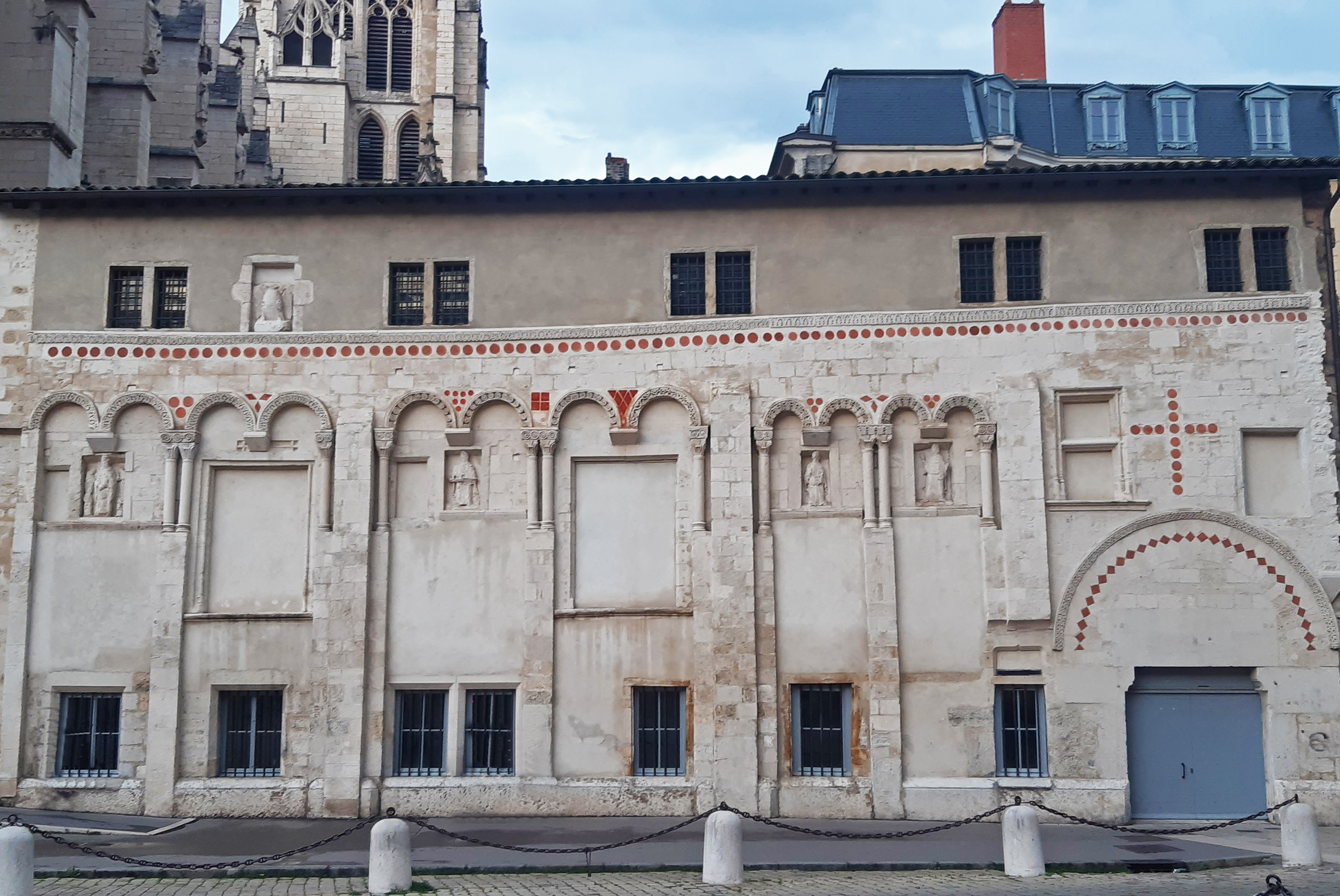
Manécanterie, Lyon

=== 17th and 18th centuries ===
- City Hall on the Place des Terreaux, built by architects Jules Hardouin-Mansart and Robert de Cotte
- Musée des beaux-arts de Lyon, fine arts museum housed in a former convent of the 17th century, including the Baroque chapelle Saint-Pierre
- Hôtel-Dieu de Lyon (17th and 18th century), historical hospital with a baroque chapel
- Temple du Change (17th and 18th century), former stock exchange of Lyon, Protestant temple since the 18th century
- Place Bellecour, one of the largest town squares in Europe
- Chapelle de la Trinité (1622), the first Baroque chapel built in Lyon, and part of the former École de la Trinité, now Collège-lycée Ampère
- Église Saint-Polycarpe (1665–1670), Classical church
- Église Saint-Just (16th to 18th century), Classical church
- Saint-Bruno des Chartreux (17th and 18th century), church, masterpiece of Baroque architecture
- Église Notre Dame Saint-Vincent (18th century), Neo-classical church
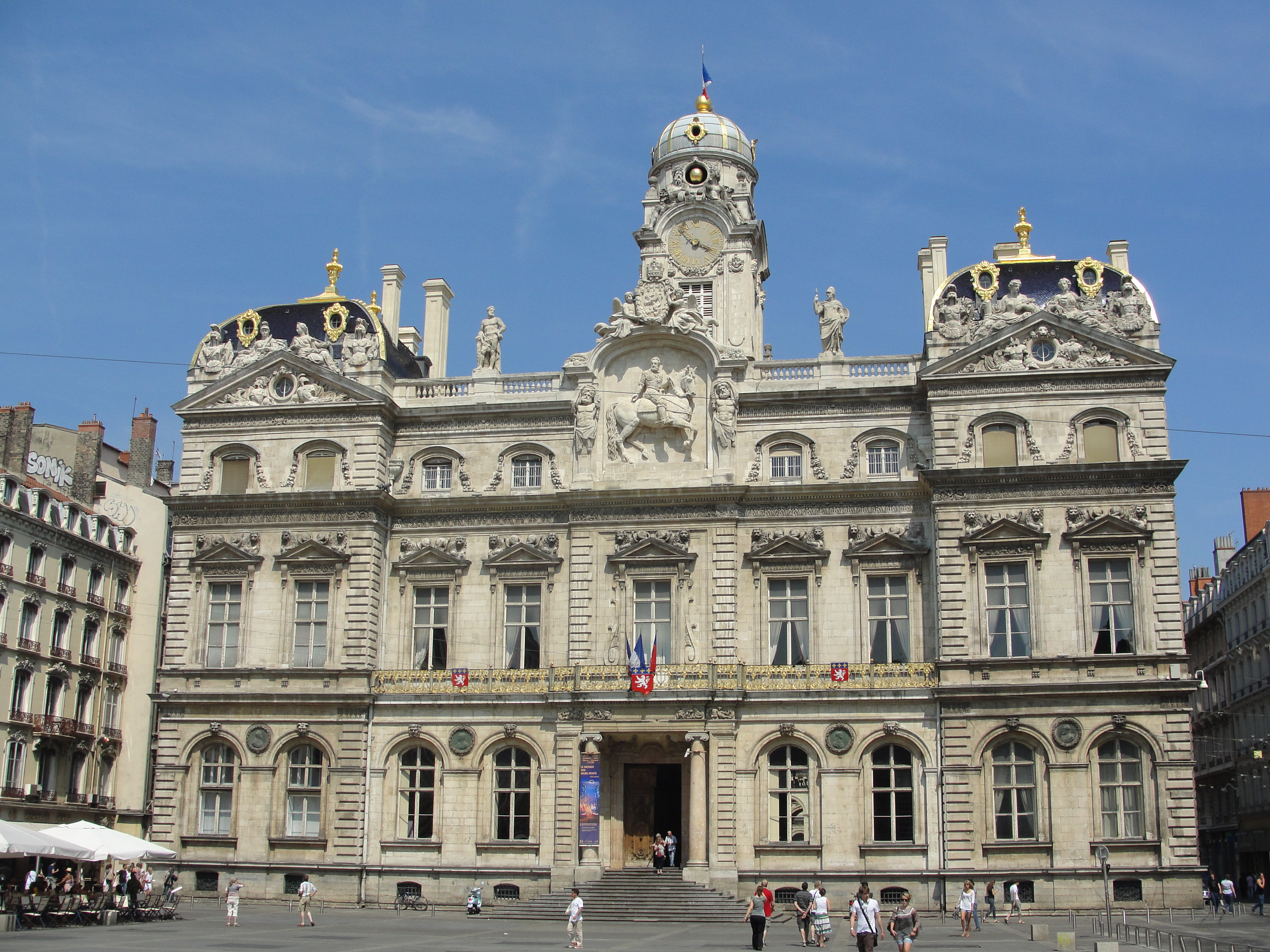
Hôtel de Ville, Lyon

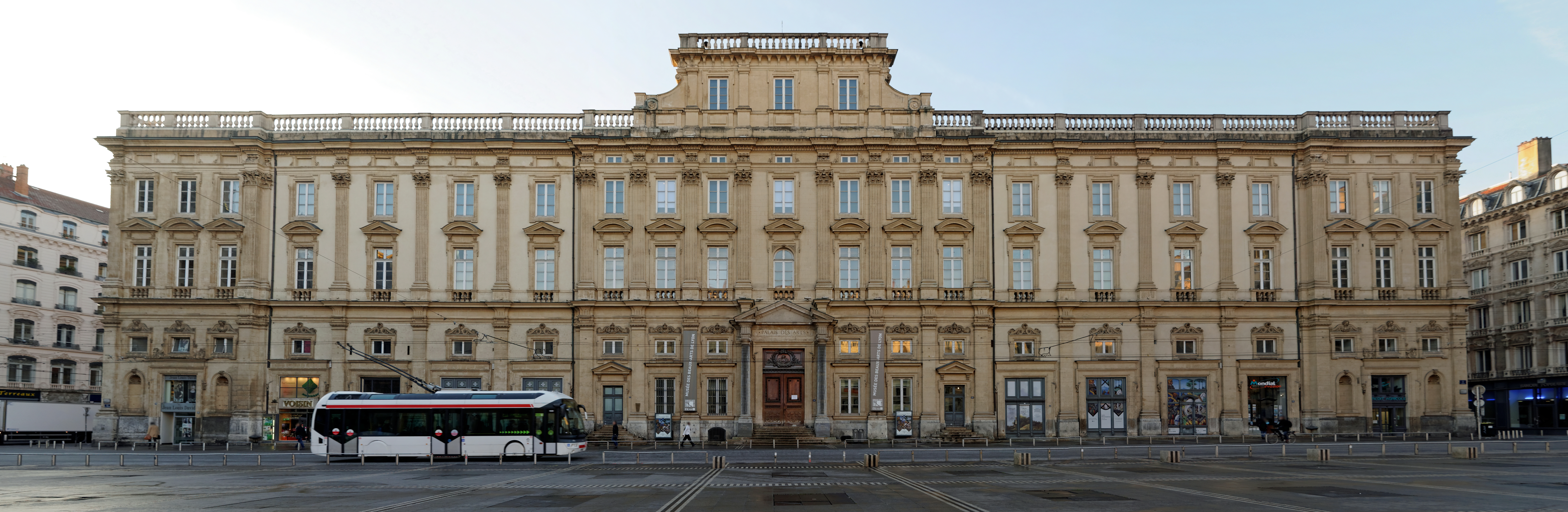
Museum of Fine Arts of Lyon

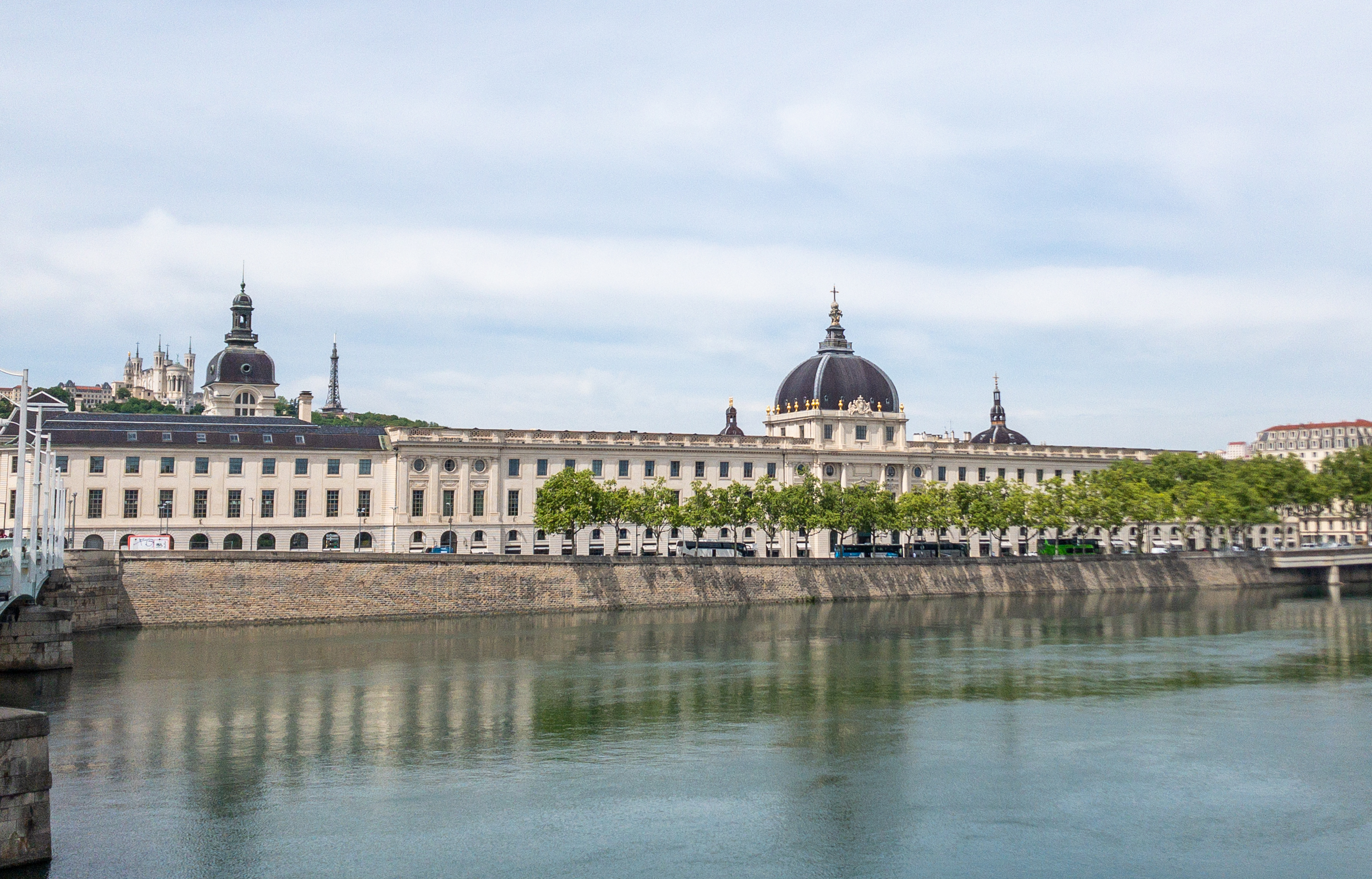
Hôtel-Dieu de Lyon

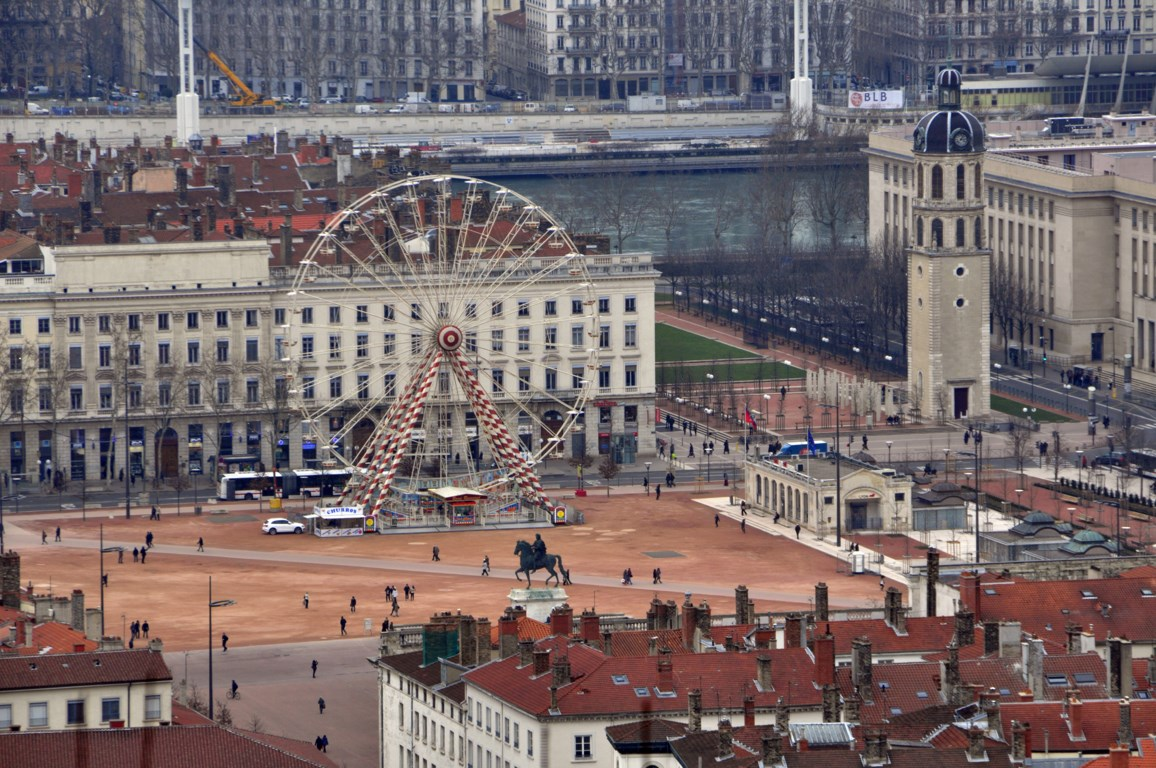
Place Bellecour

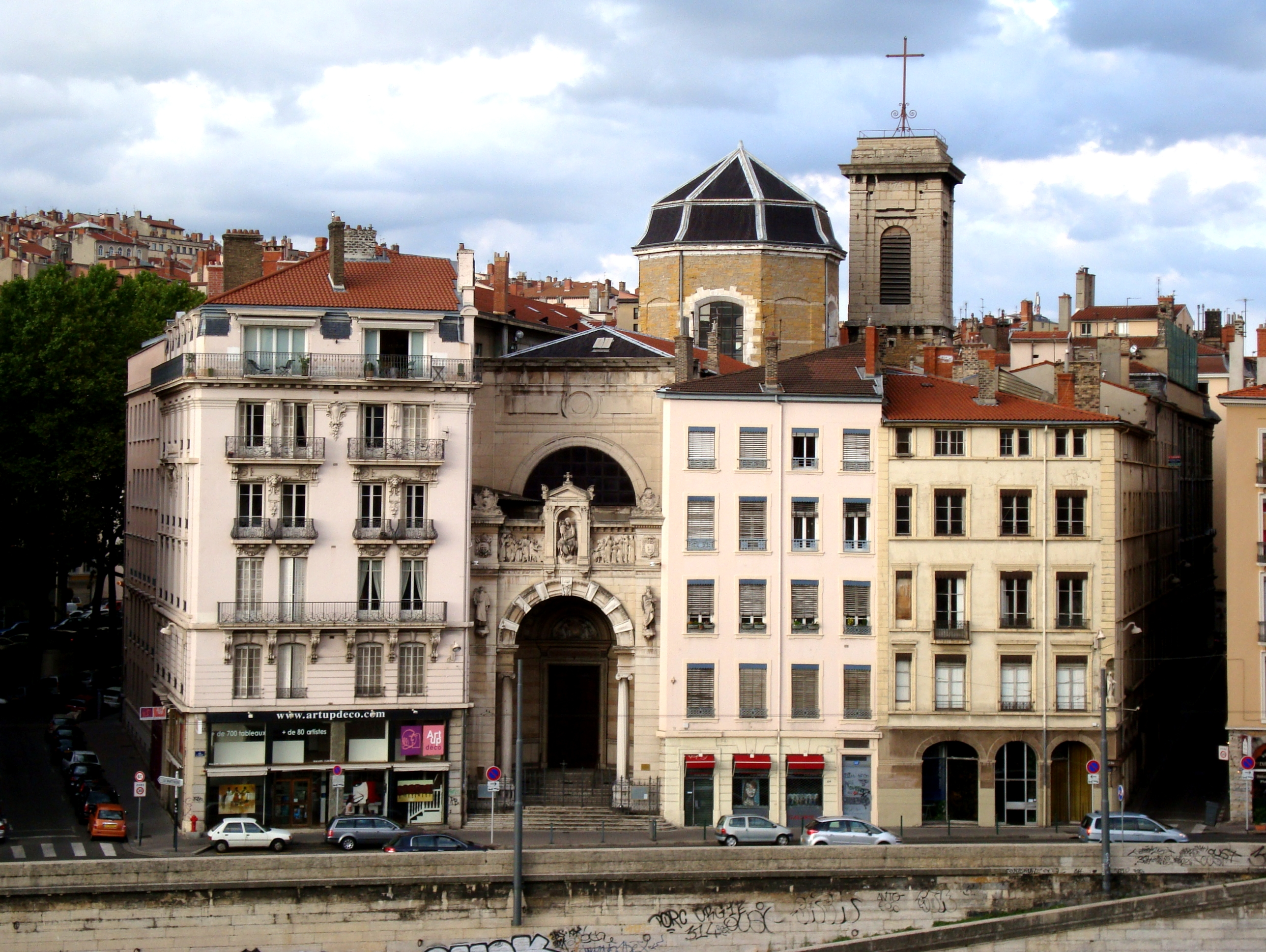
Église Notre Dame Saint-Vincent

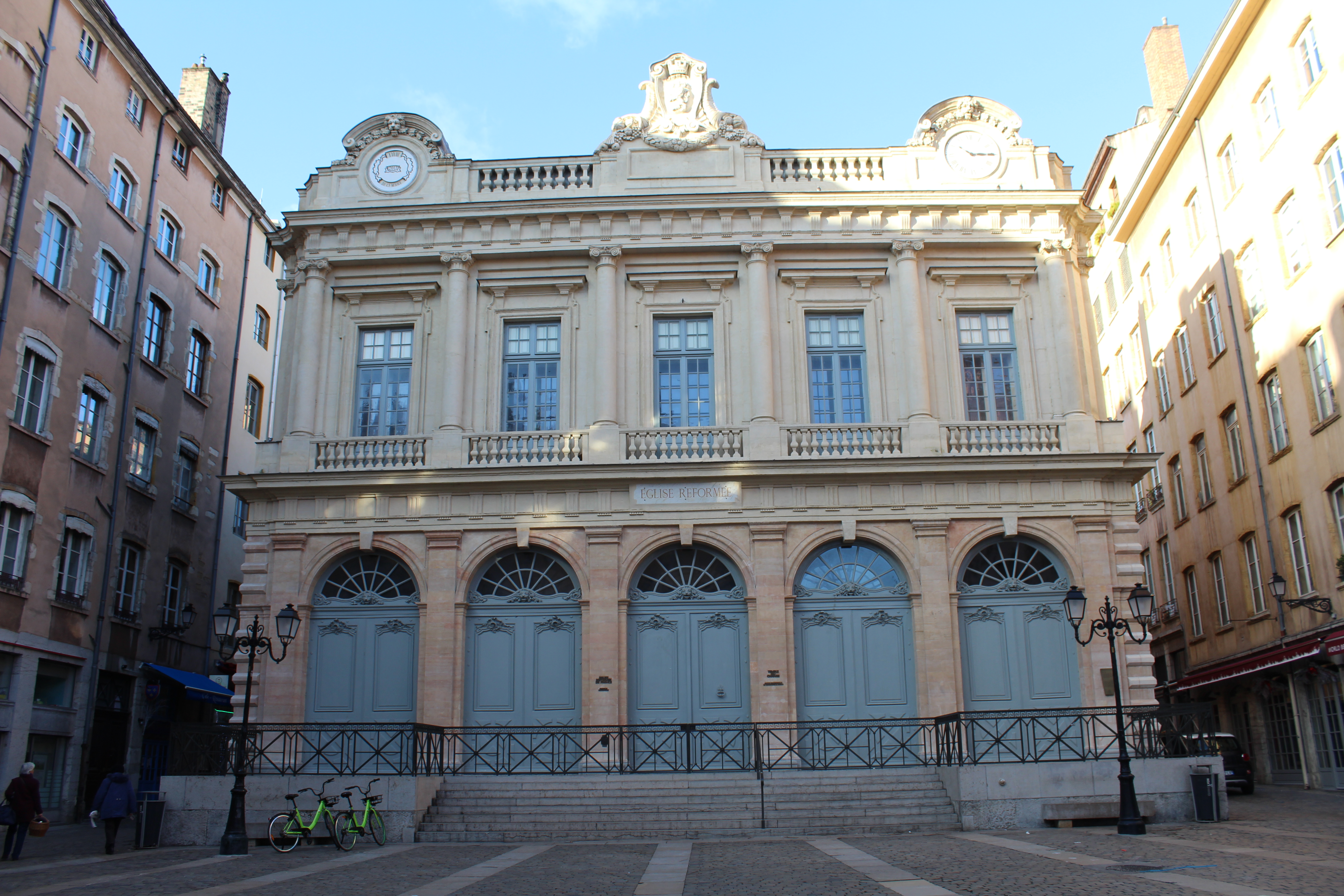
Temple du Change

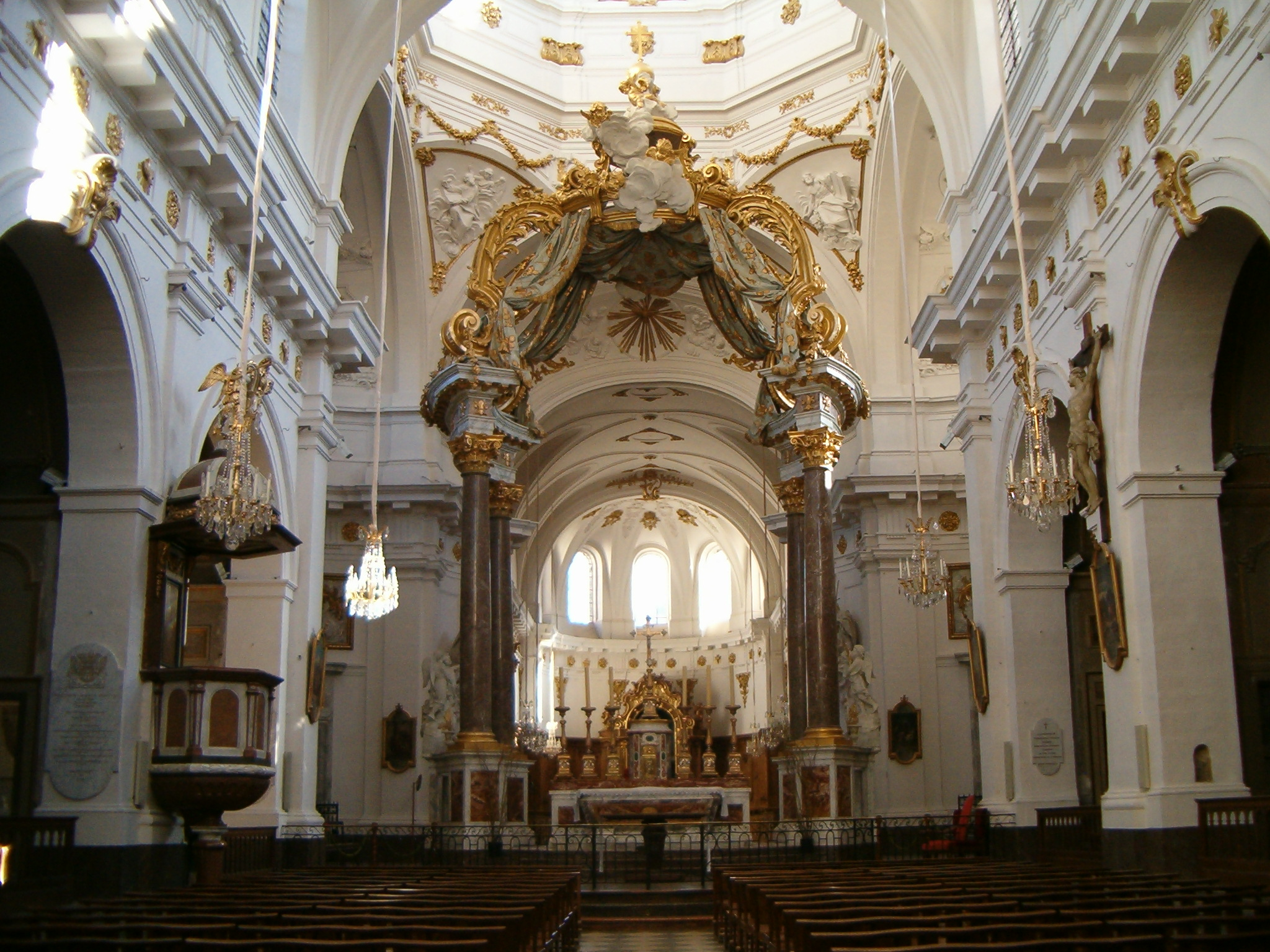
Church of Saint-Bruno des Chartreux

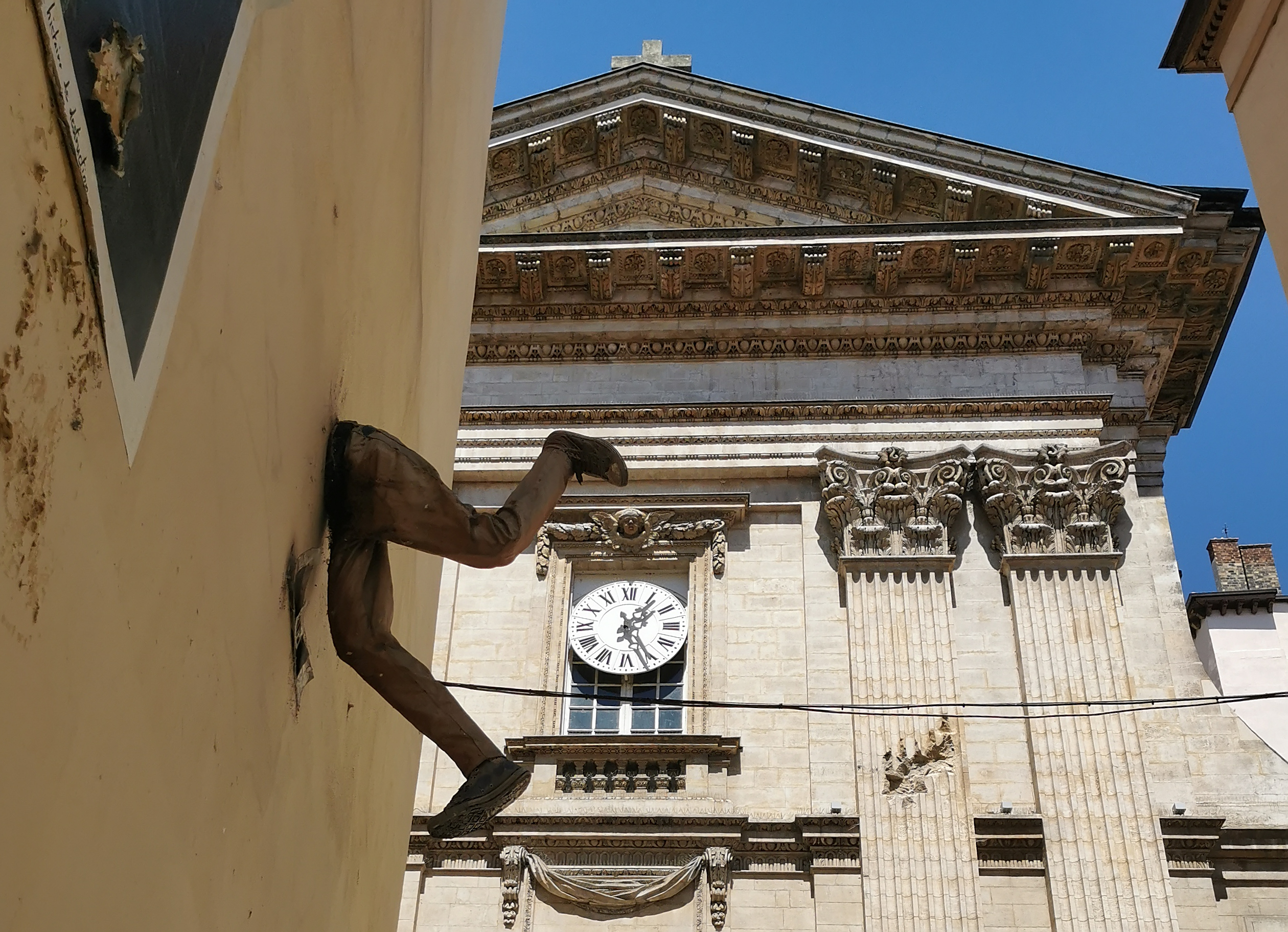
Église Saint-Polycarpe

=== 19th century and modern city ===
- Opéra Nouvel (1831), renovated in 1993 by Jean Nouvel
- Théâtre des Célestins (1877), designed by Gaspard André
- Basilica of Notre-Dame de Fourvière, large 19th-century basilica on the top of Fourvière Hill
- Tour métallique de Fourvière (1894)
- Vacherie du Parc (1904–1905), designed by Tony Garnier.
- La Mouche Cattle Market and Abattoir (1914, 1928), also by Garnier
- Sainte Marie de La Tourette monastery (1960), designed by Le Corbusier
- Saint-Exupéry International Airport (formerly Satolas Airport), designed by Guillaume Gillet
- Gare de Lyon Saint-Exupéry (1994) by Santiago Calatrava
- Palais des congrès de Lyon (1998), designed by Renzo Piano and a group of buildings for various functions
- Tour du Crédit Lyonnais
- Tour Oxygène
- Tour Incity
- Great mosque of Lyon
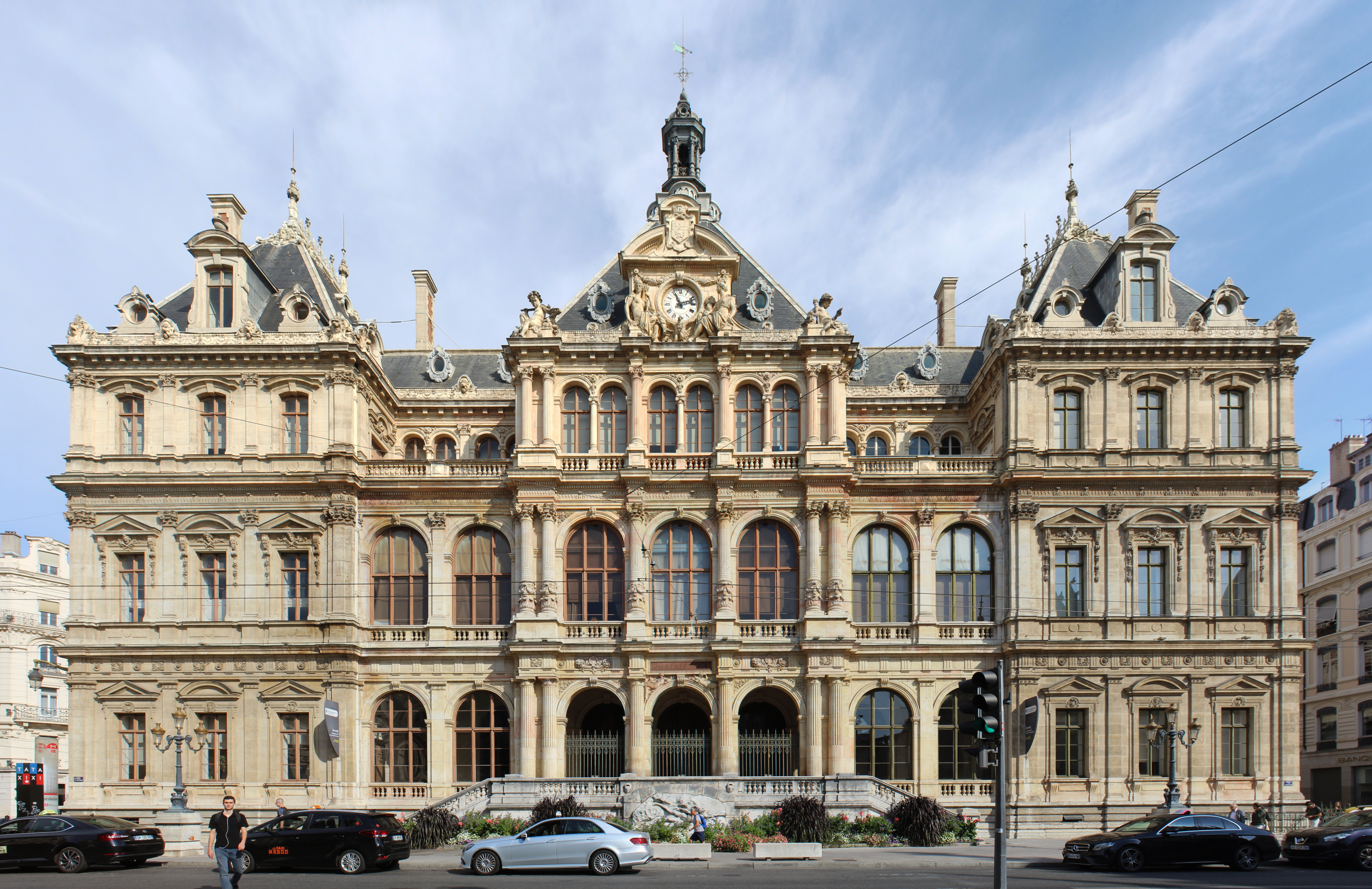
Palais de la Bourse, Lyon

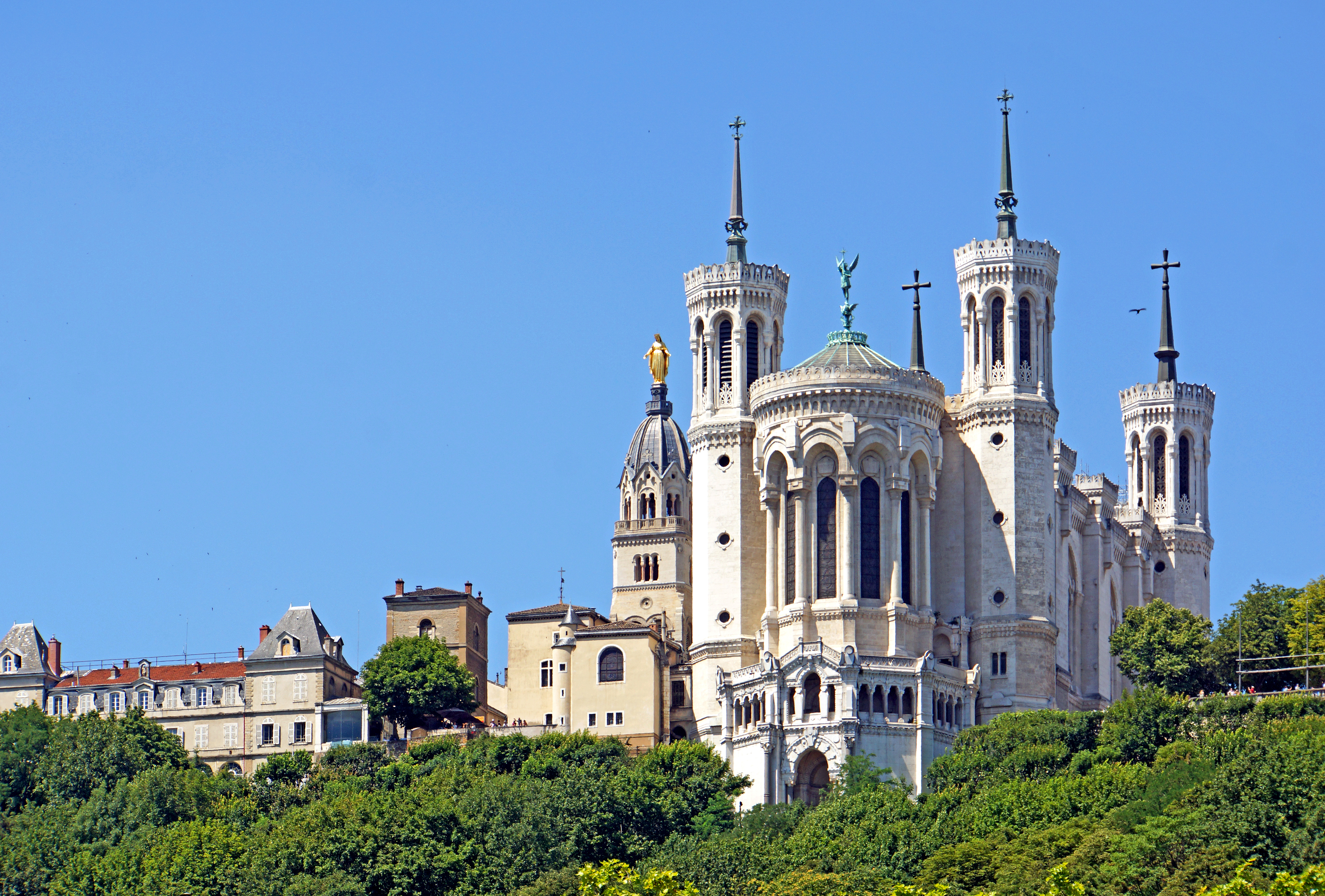
Basilica of Notre-Dame de Fourvière

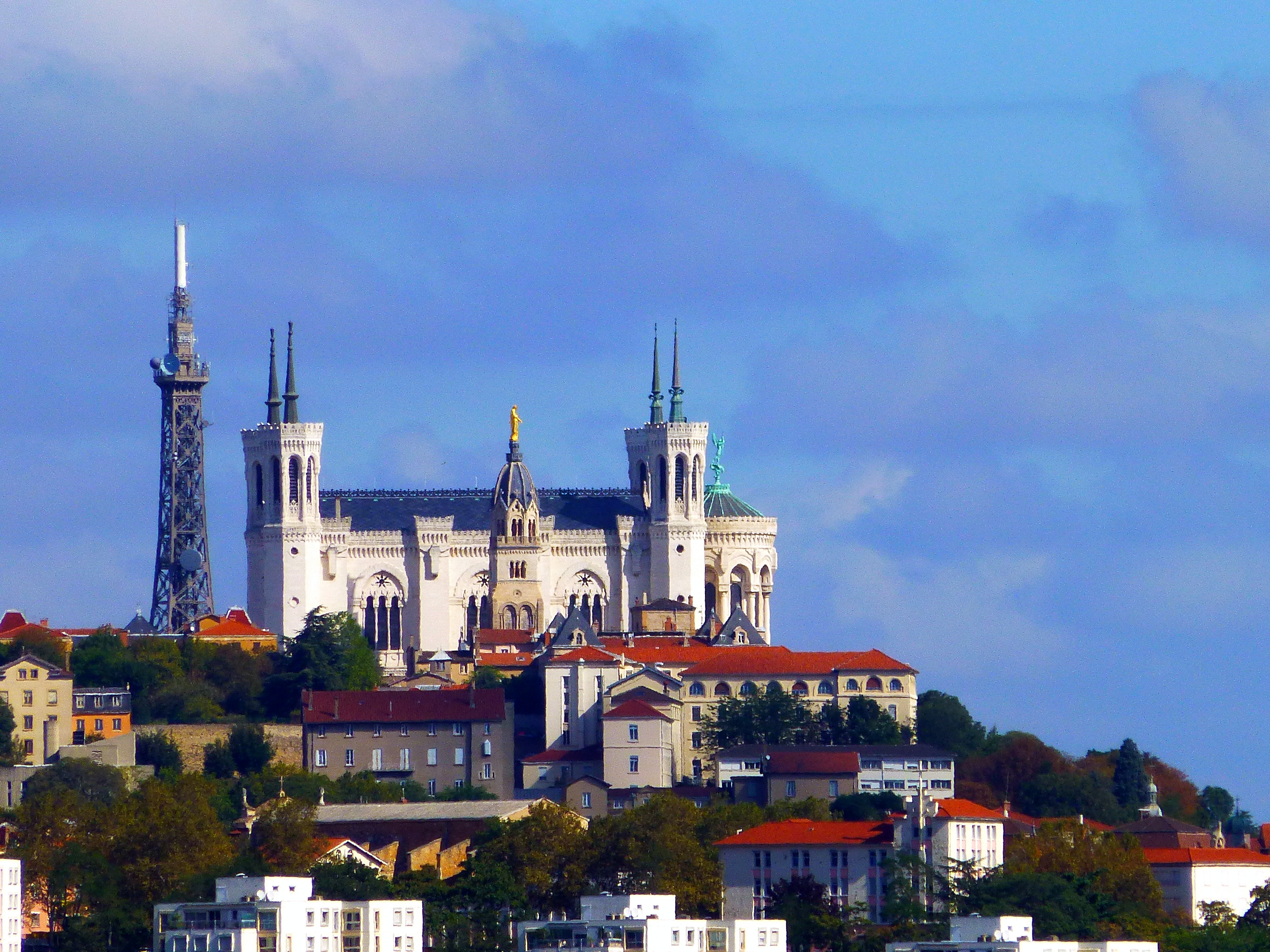
Metallic tower of Fourvière

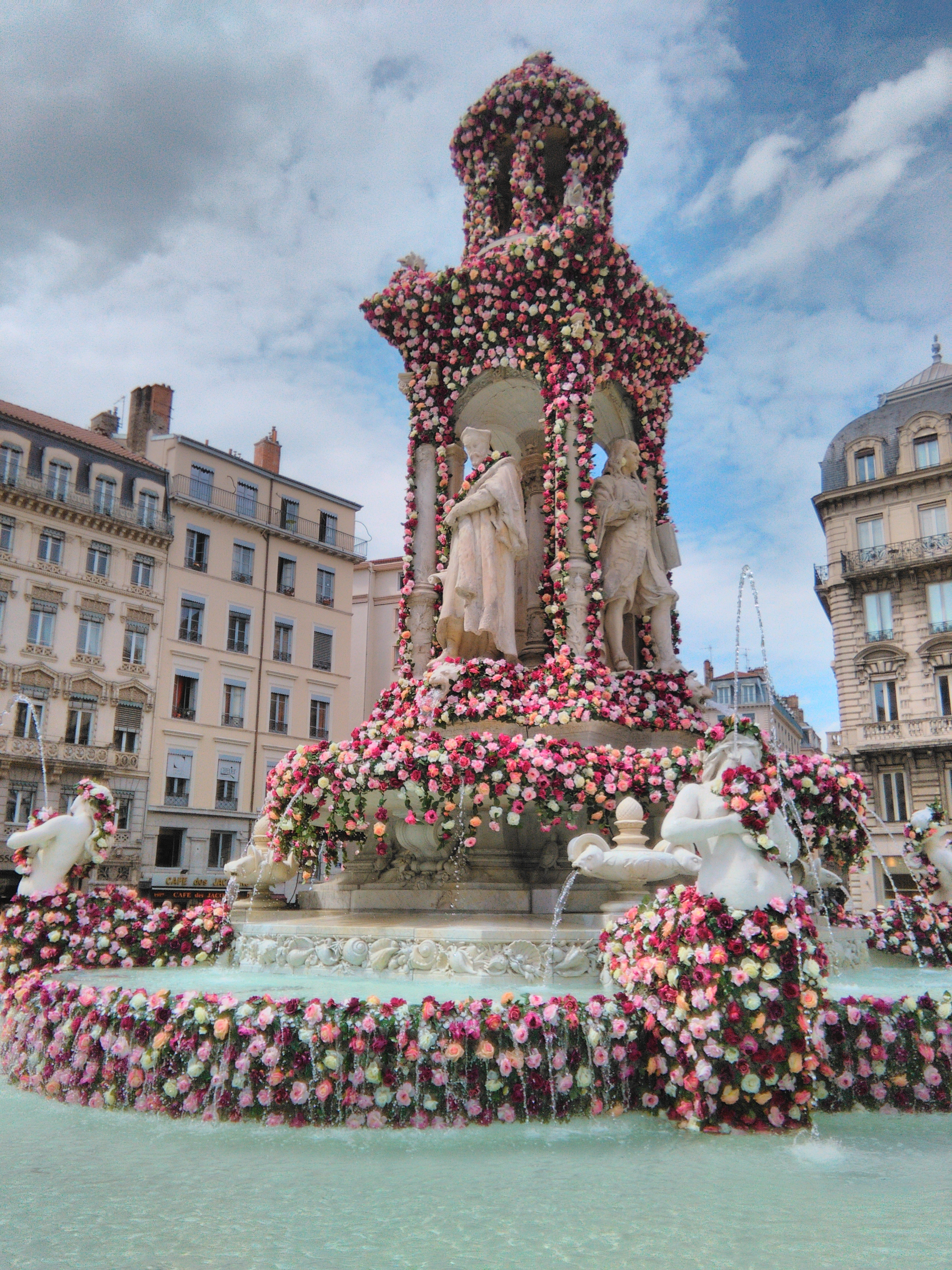
Fountain, place des Jacobins

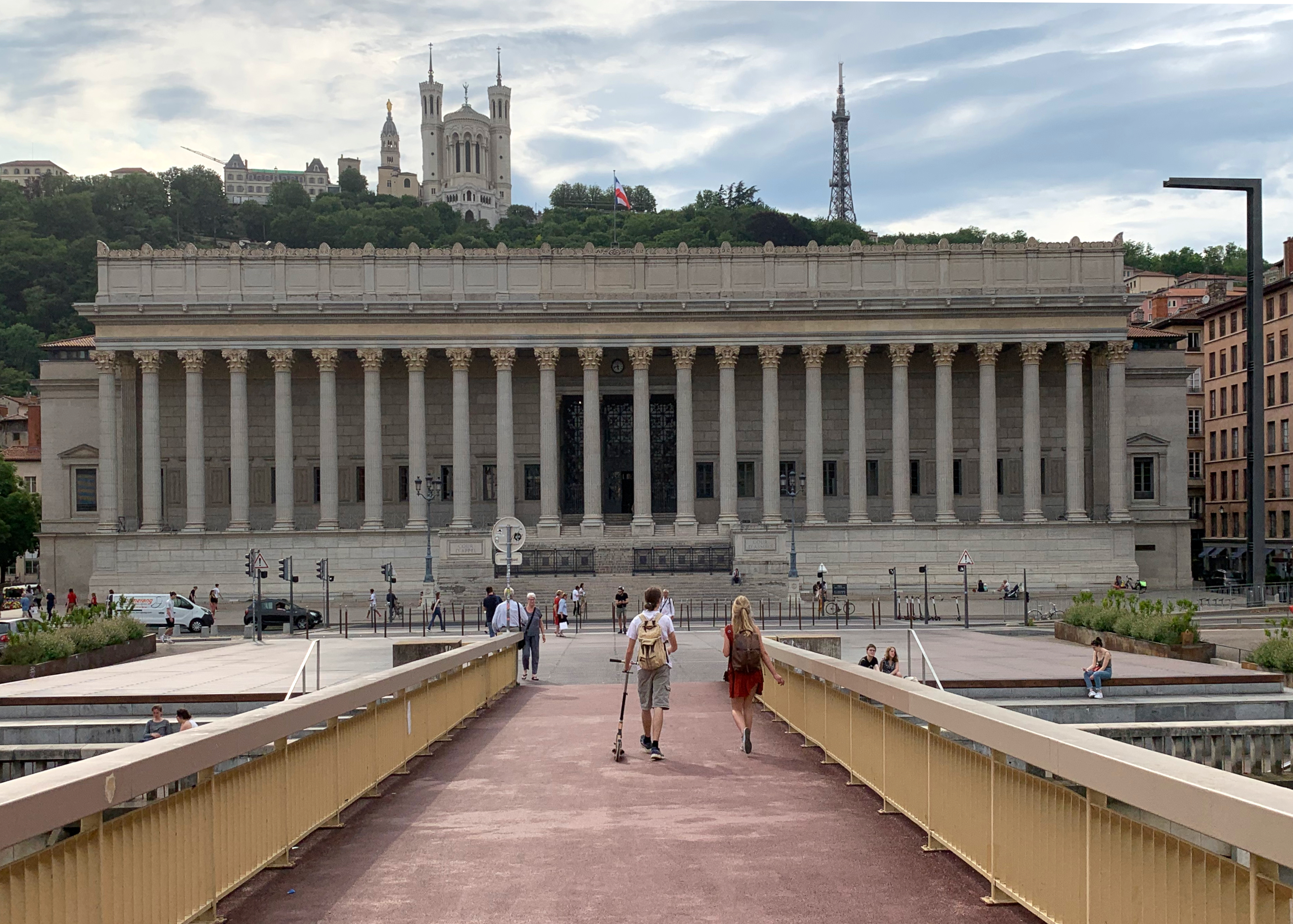
Palais de justice historique de Lyon

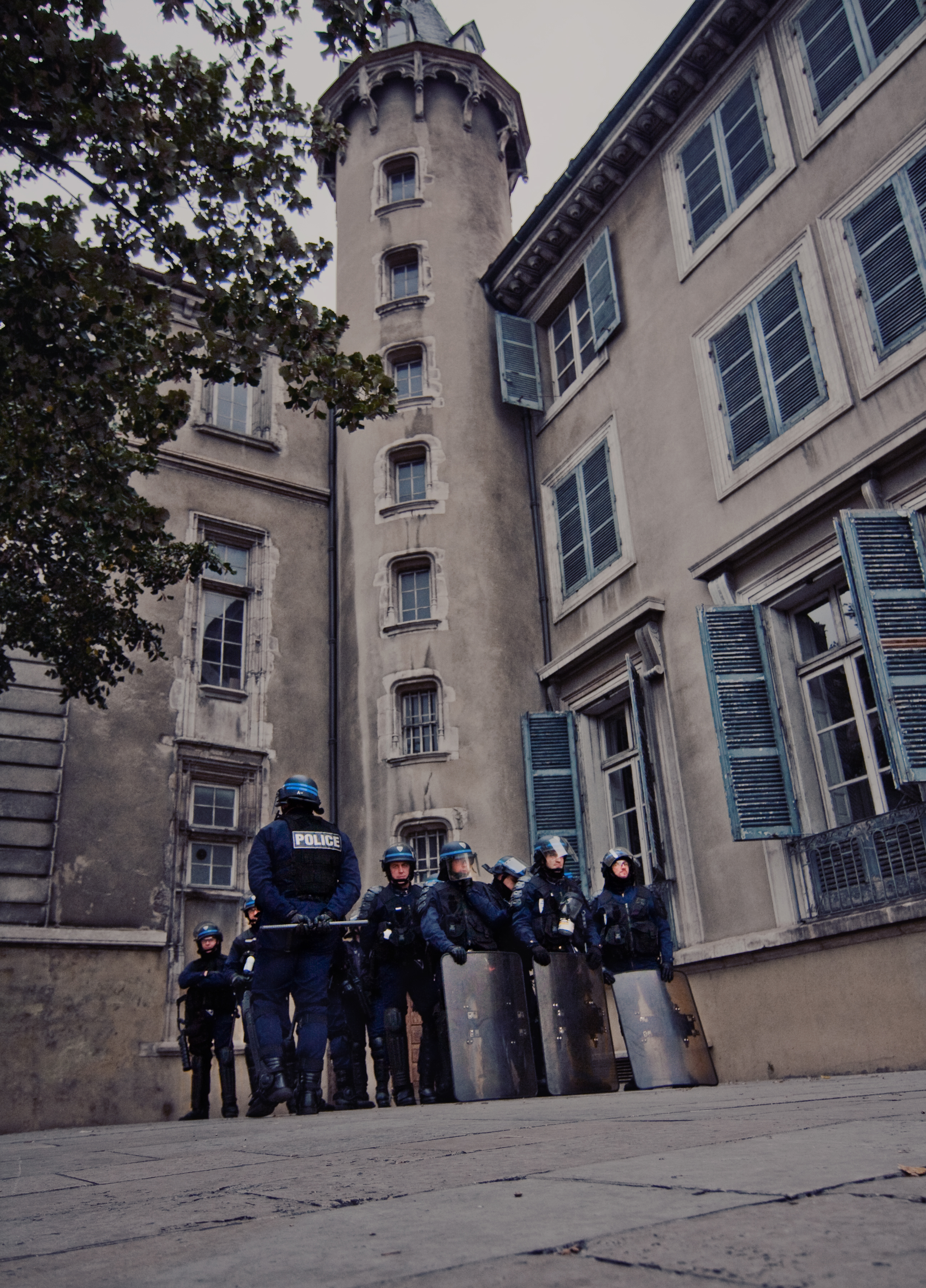
Arch-episcopal palace of Lyon (5th district public library)

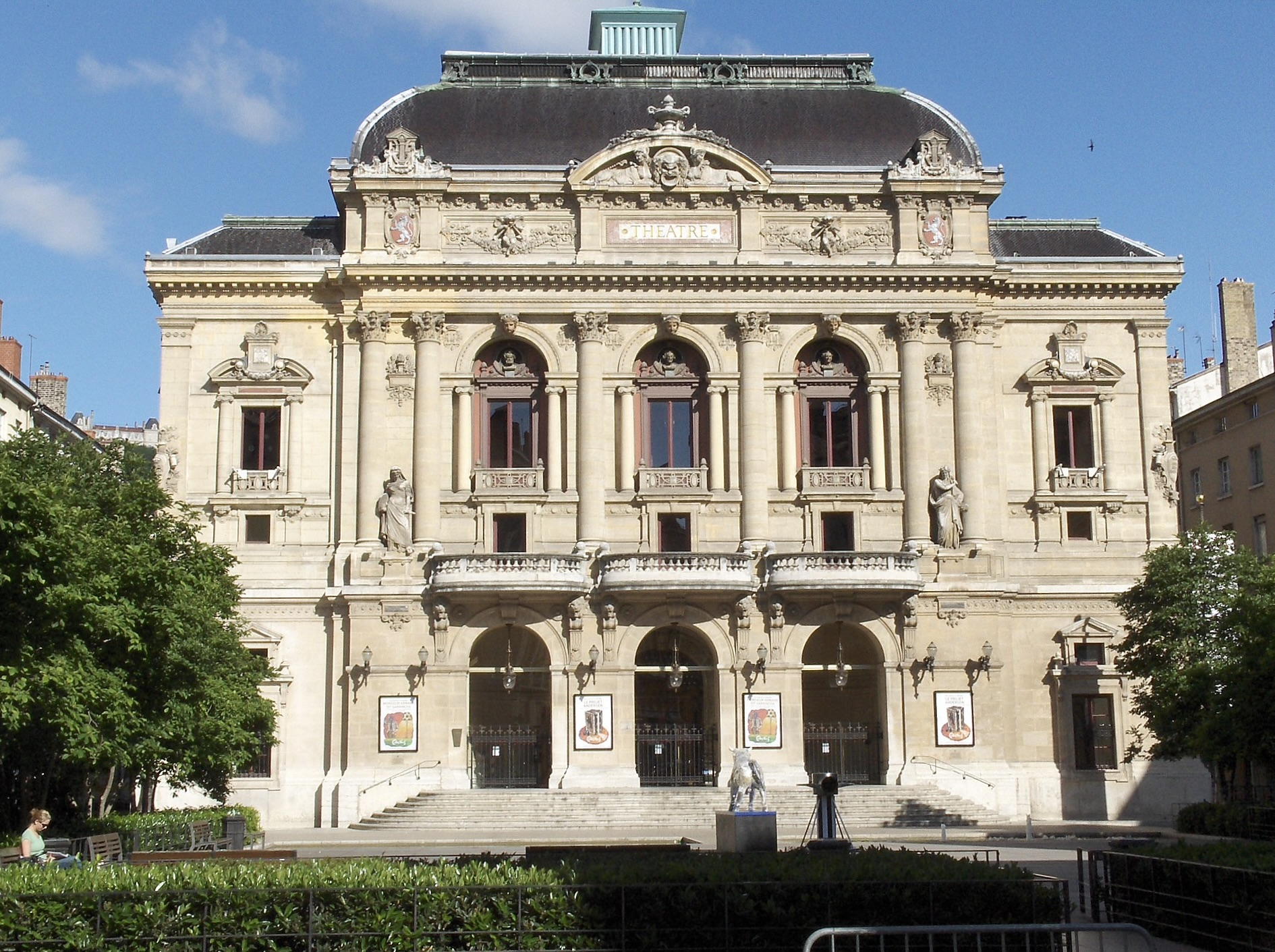
Théâtre des Célestins

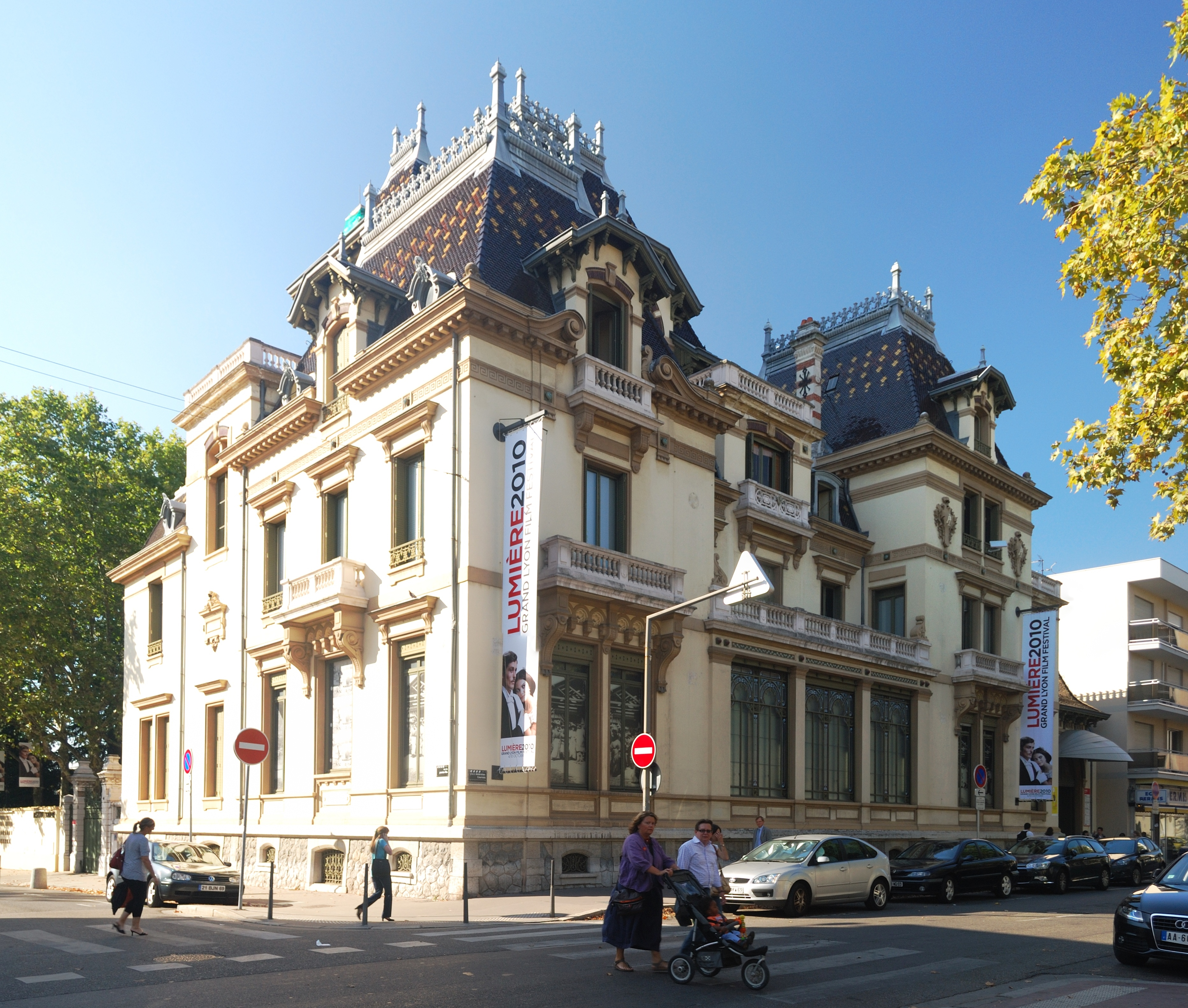
Museum of Institut Lumière

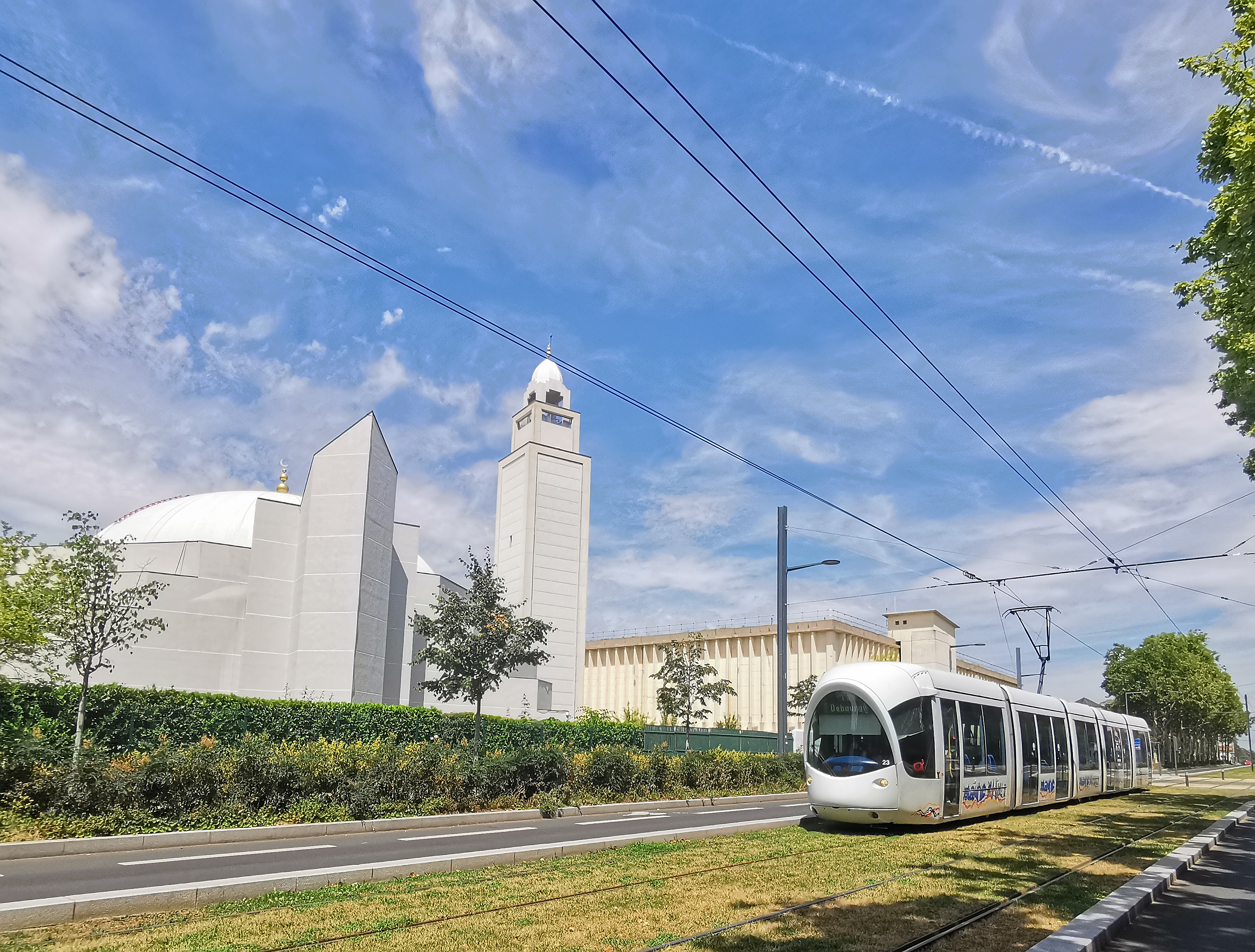
Grande mosquée de Lyon

=== Museums ===
The Musée des Confluences from the Raymond Barre bridge

- Musée des beaux-arts de Lyon (Fine Arts Museum), main museum of the city and one of the larger art galleries in France. Housed in the Palais Saint Pierre, a former 17th-century convent, it displays a major collection of paintings by artists (including Tintoretto; Paolo Veronese; Nicolas Poussin; Rubens; Rembrandt; Zurbaran; Canaletto; Delacroix; Monet; Gauguin; Van Gogh; Cézanne; Matisse; Picasso; Francis Bacon...); collections of sculptures, drawings and printings, decorative arts, Roman and Greek antiquities; the second largest collection of Egyptian antiquities in France after that of the Louvre; and a medal cabinet of 50.000 medals and coins.
- The Gallo-Roman Museum displaying many valuable objects and artworks found on the site of Roman Lyon (Lugdunum) such as Circus Games Mosaic, Coligny calendar and the Taurobolic Altar
- Centre d'histoire de la résistance et de la déportation
- Musée des Confluences, new museum of sciences and anthropology, which opened its doors on 20 December 2014
- La Sucrière, contemporary art centre
- Hôtel-Dieu de Lyon houses the "Musée des Hospices Civils", a permanent exhibit tracing the history and practice of medicine from the Middle Ages to modern times
- Musée des Tissus et des Arts décoratifs, decorative arts and textile museum, which is one of the world's larger textile collections with 2.5 million works
- Musée d'art contemporain de Lyon, contemporary art museum
- Musée de L'imprimerie, printing museum
- Musée Gadagne, museum of the history of Lyon housed in a historic building in Vieux Lyon, which includes a large collection of marionettes
- Musée des Automates, museum of automated puppets in Vieux Lyon, open since 1991
- Musée Miniature & Cinéma, museum featuring miniature movie sets, movie props, and special effects

=== Parks and gardens ===
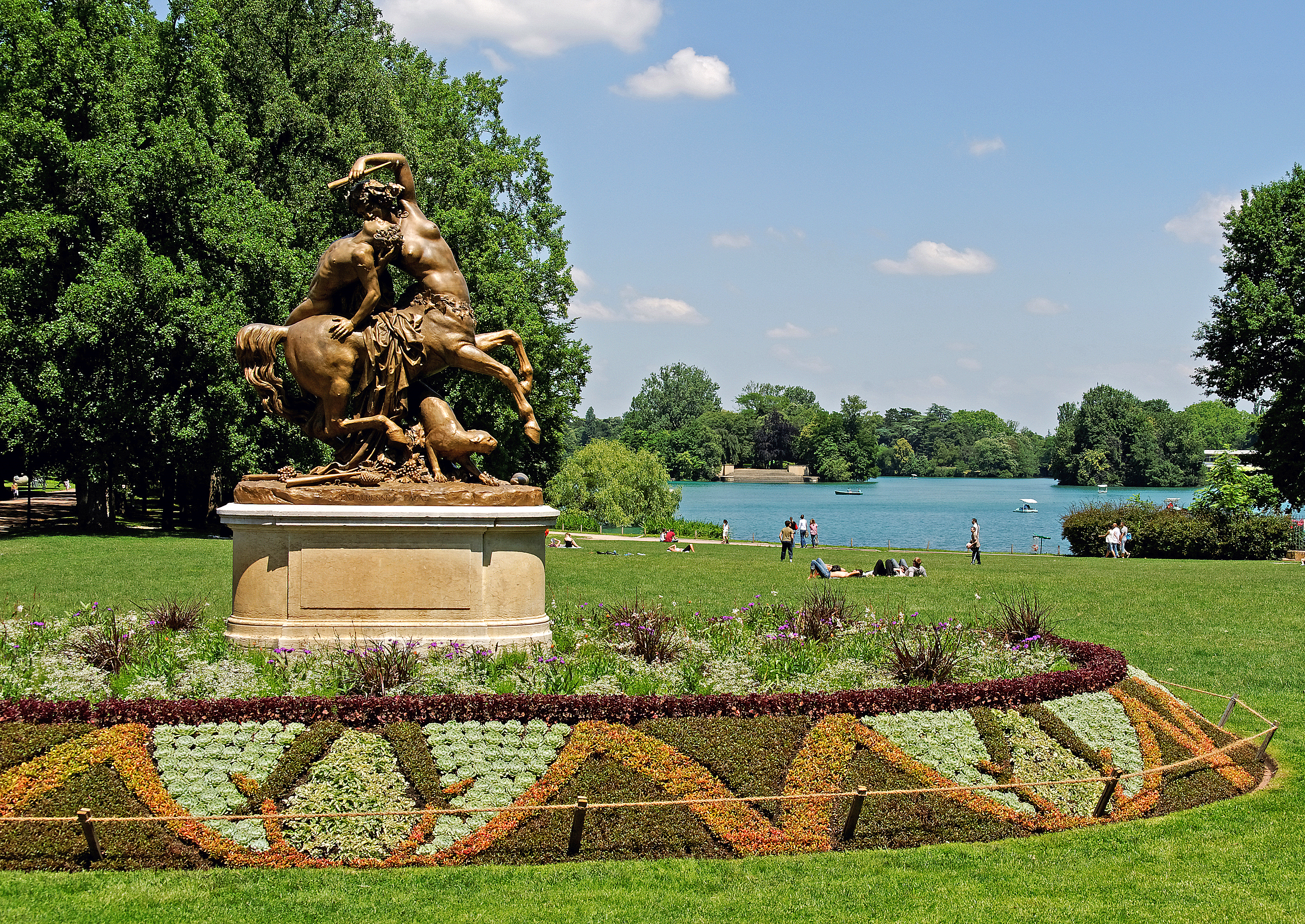
The lake in the Parc de la Tête d'or, with the Centauress and Faun sculpture in front

- Parc de la Tête d'or, aka Golden Head Park, in central Lyon is the largest urban park in France at 117 hectares (290 acres). Located in the 6th arrondissement, it features a large lake on which boating takes place during the summer months.
- Jardin botanique de Lyon (8 hectares; 20 acres), included in the Parc de la Tête d'Or, is a municipal botanical garden and is open weekdays without charge. The garden was established in 1857 as a successor to earlier botanical gardens dating to 1796, and now describes itself as France's largest municipal botanical garden.
- Parc de Gerland, in the south of the city (80 hectares; 200 acres)
- Parc des hauteurs, in Fourvières
- Parc de Miribel-Jonage (2,200 hectares; 5,400 acres)
- Parc de Lacroix-Laval (115 hectares; 280 acres)
- Parc de Parilly (178 hectares; 440 acres)

== Economy ==
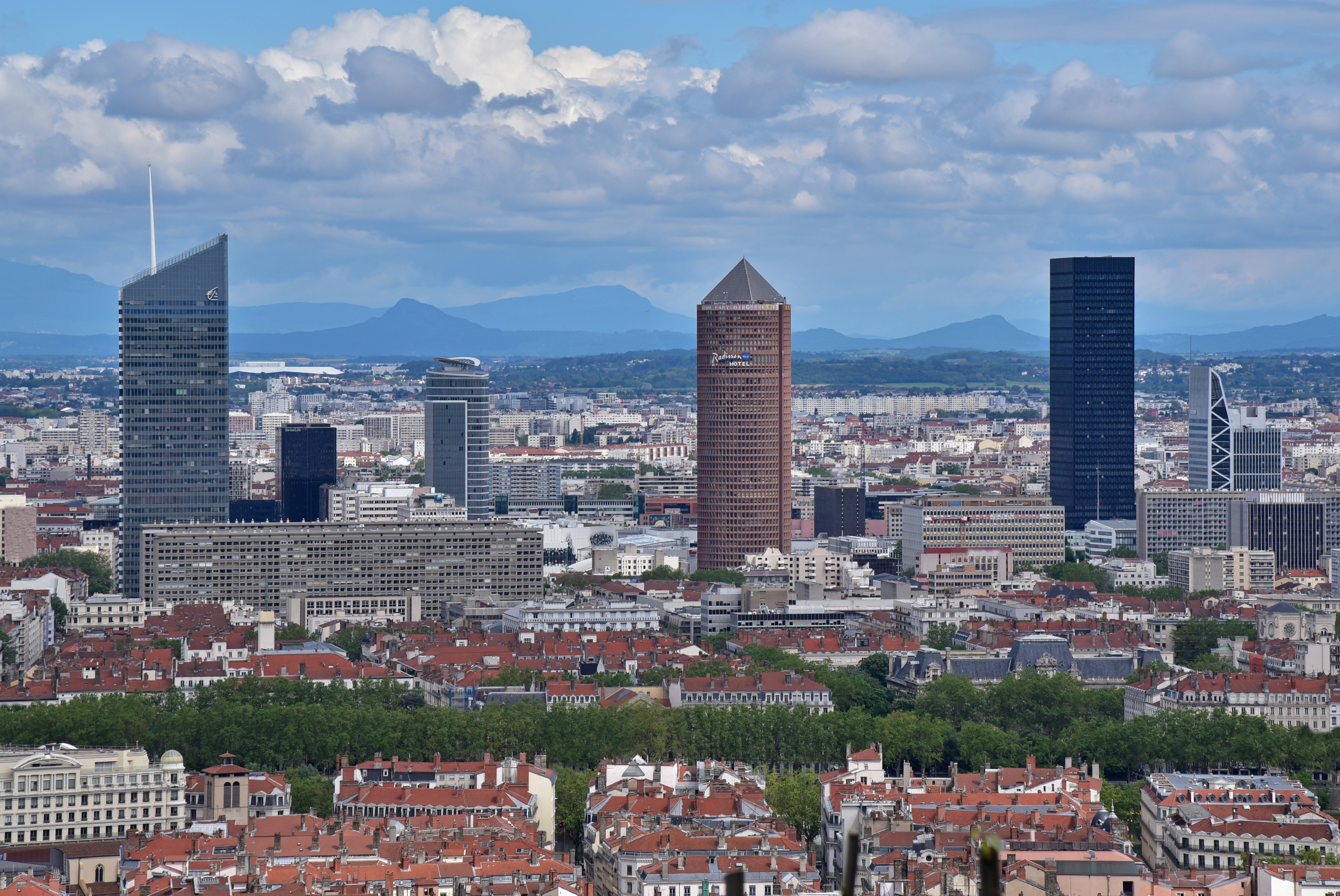
La Part-Dieu, the city's central business district

The GDP of Lyon was 124 billion US dollars in 2019, (Note: Constant PPP US dollars, base year 2015.) making it the second richest city in France after Paris. Lyon and its region Rhône-Alpes represent one of the most important economies in Europe and, according to Loughborough University, can be compared to Philadelphia, Mumbai or Athens with regard to its international position. The city of Lyon is working in partnership to more easily enable the establishment of new headquarters in the territory (ADERLY, Chambre du commerce et d'industrie, Grand Lyon...). High-tech industries such as biotechnology, software development, video game (Arkane Studios, Ivory Tower, Eden Games, EA France, Bandai Namco Entertainment Europe), and internet services are also growing. Other important sectors include medical research and technology, non-profit institutions, and universities. Lyon is home to the P4-Inserm–ean Merieux Laboratory which conducts top-level vaccine research.

The city is home to the headquarters of many large companies such as Groupe SEB, Sanofi Pasteur, Renault Trucks, Norbert Dentressangle, LCL S.A., Descours & Cabaud, Merial, Point S, BioMérieux, Iveco Bus, Compagnie Nationale du Rhône, GL Events, April Group, Boiron, Feu Vert, Panzani, Babolat, Lyon Airports, LVL Medical, and inter-governmental agencies IARC and Interpol. The specialisation of some sectors of activities has led to the creation of many main business centres: La Part-Dieu, located in the 3rd arrondissement is the second biggest business quarter after La Défense in Paris with over 1,600,000 m^{2} (17,222,256.67 sq ft) of office space and services and more than 55,000 jobs. Cité Internationale, created by the architect Renzo Piano is located in the border of the Parc de la Tête d'Or in the 6th arrondissement. The worldwide headquarters of Interpol is located there. The district of Confluence, in the south of the historic centre, is a new pole of economical and cultural development.

Tourism is an important part of the Lyon economy, with one billion euros in 2007 and 3.5 million hotel-nights in 2006 provided by non-residents. Approximately 60% of tourists visit for business, with the rest for leisure. In January 2009, Lyon ranked first in France for hostels business. The festivals most important for attracting tourists are the Fête des lumières, the Nuits de Fourvière every summer, the Biennale d'art contemporain and the Nuits Sonores.

== Culture ==
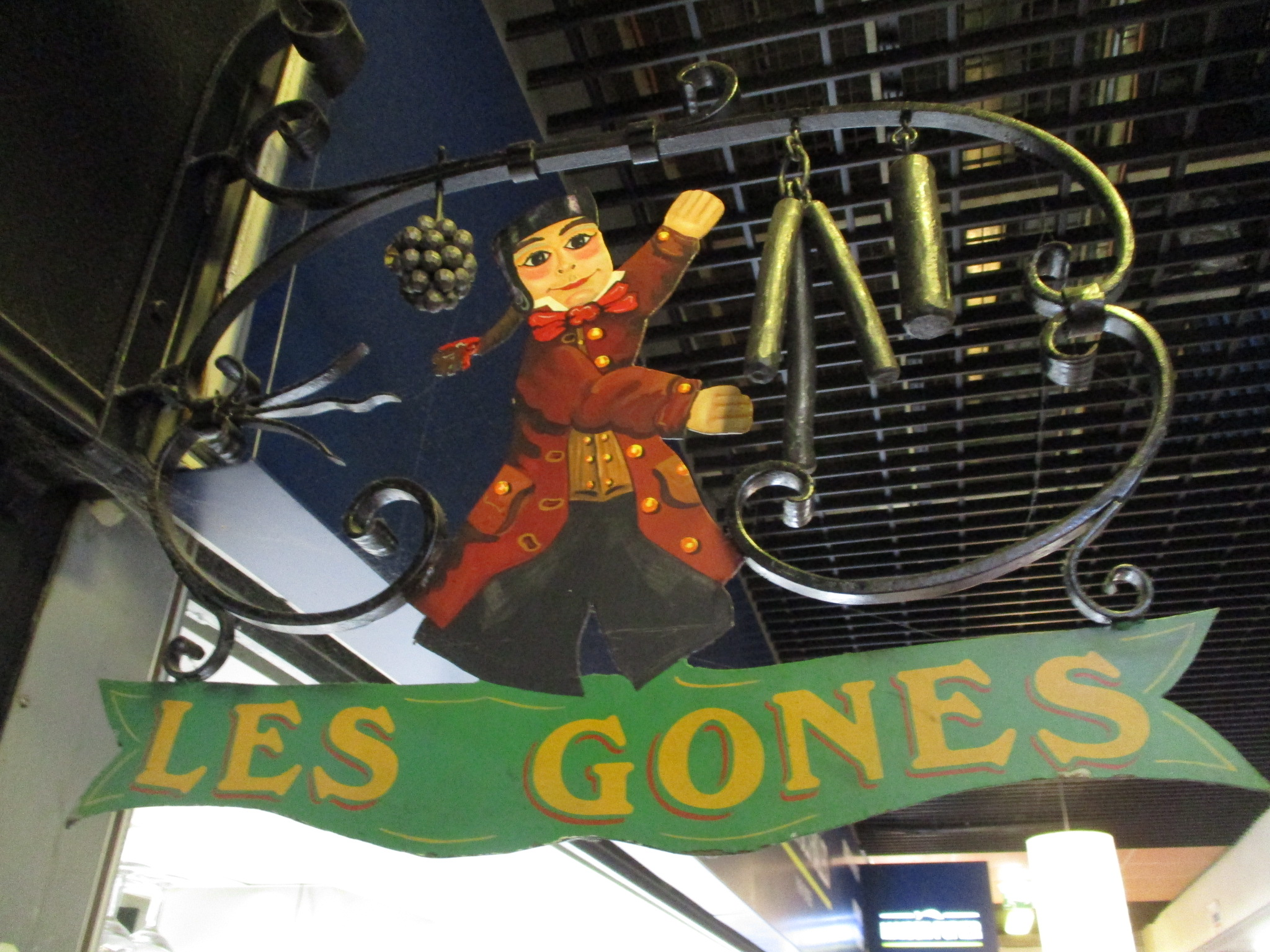
Guignol, created in the early 19th century, associated with the silk-workers

Since the Middle Ages, the region residents have spoken several dialects of Franco-Provençal. The Lyonnais dialect was replaced by the French language as the importance of the city grew. However some "frenchified" Franco-Provençal words can also be heard in the French of the Lyonnais, who call their little boys and girls "gones" and "fenottes" for example.

- The Lumière brothers pioneered cinema in the town in 1895. The Institut Lumière, built as Auguste Lumiere's house, and a fascinating piece of architecture in its own right, holds many of their first inventions and other early cinematic and photographic artifacts.
- 8 December each year is marked by the Festival of Lights (la Fête des lumières), a celebration of thanks to the Virgin Mary, who purportedly saved the city from a deadly plague in the Middle Ages. During the event, the local population places candles (luminions) at their windows and the city of Lyon organizes large-scale light shows onto the sides of important Lyonnais monuments, such as the medieval Cathédrale St-Jean.
- The Saint Francis of Sales church is famous for its large and unaltered Cavaillé-Coll pipe organ, attracting audiences from around the world.
- The Opéra Nouvel (New Opera House) is the home of the Opéra National de Lyon. The original opera house was re-designed by the distinguished French architect Jean Nouvel between 1985 and 1993 and is named after him.
- Lyon is also the French capital of "trompe l'œil" walls, a very ancient tradition. Many are to be seen around the city. This old tradition is now finding a contemporary expression, for example in the art of Guillaume Bottazzi.
- The Brothers of the Sacred Heart, a Roman Catholic congregation that operates schools in Europe and North America, was founded in Lyon in 1821.
- The African Museum of Lyon is one of the oldest museums situated in Lyon.
- The Museum of Resistance and Deportation looks at the various individuals prominent in the Resistance movement in World War II. The building is strongly linked to Klaus Barbie. Lyon sees itself as the centre of the French resistance and many members were shot in Place Bellecour in the town centre. The exhibition is largely a series of mini-biographies of those involved.
- Lyon is a pilot city of the Council of Europe and the European Commission Intercultural cities program.

=== UNESCO World Heritage Site ===
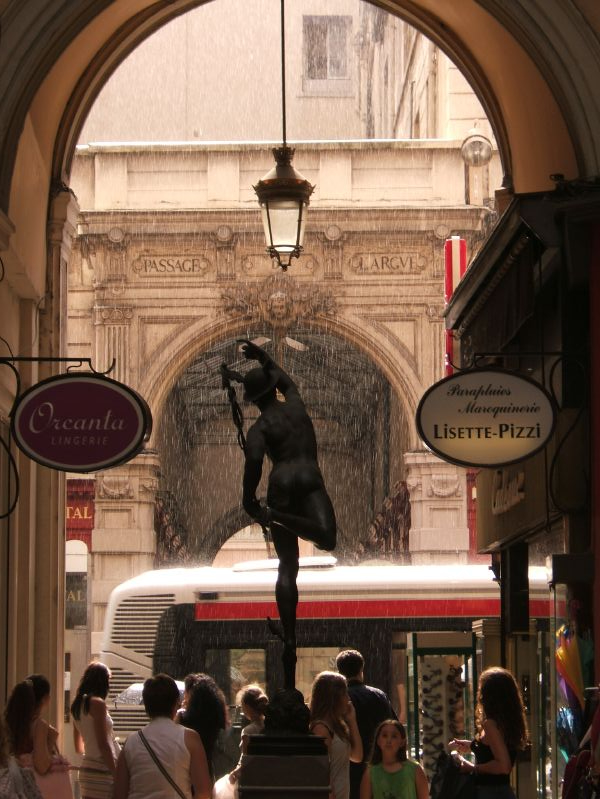
Passage de l'Argue

The historic site of Lyon was designated a UNESCO World Heritage Site in 1998. In its designation, UNESCO cited the "exceptional testimony to the continuity of urban settlement over more than two millennia on a site of great commercial and strategic significance." The specific regions comprising the historic site include the Roman district and Fourvière, the Renaissance district (Vieux Lyon), the silk district (slopes of Croix-Rousse), and the Presqu'île, which features architecture from the 12th century to modern times.

Both Vieux Lyon and the slopes of Croix-Rousse are known for their narrow passageways (named traboules) that pass through buildings and link streets on either side. The first examples of traboules are thought to have been built in Lyon in the 4th century. The traboules allowed the inhabitants to get from their homes to the Saône quickly and allowed the canuts on the Croix-Rousse hill to get from their workshops to the textile merchants at the foot of the hill.

=== Gastronomy ===
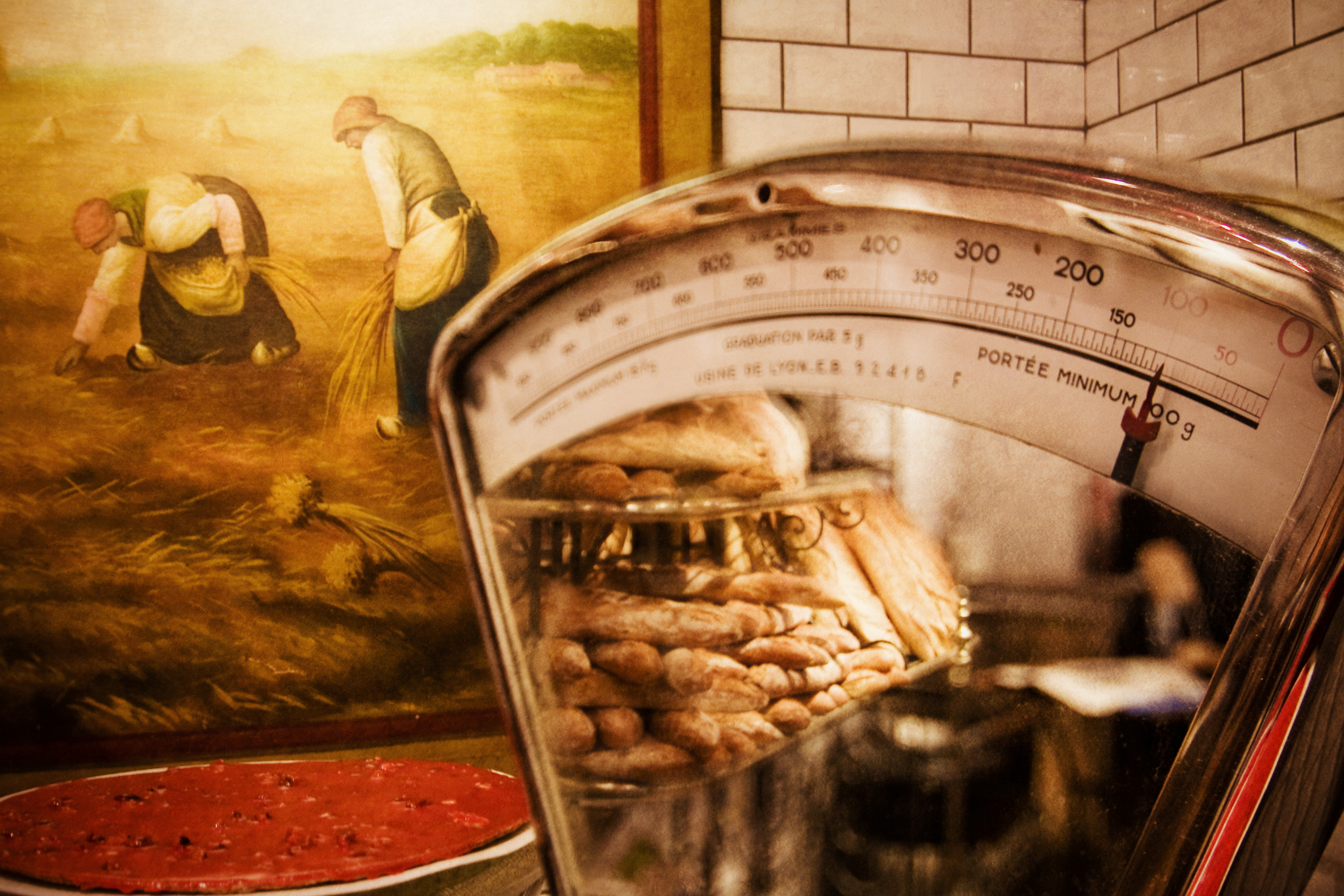
Île Barbe bakery at the Halles de Lyon-Paul Bocuse

Lyon has a long and chronicled culinary arts tradition. The noted food critic Curnonsky referred to the city as "the gastronomic capital of the world", a claim repeated by later writers such as Bill Buford. Renowned 3-star Michelin chefs such as Marie Bourgeois and Eugénie Brazier developed Lyonnaise cuisine into a national phenomenon favoured by the French elite; a tradition which Paul Bocuse later turned into a worldwide success. The bouchon is a traditional Lyonnais restaurant that serves local fare such as sausages, duck pâté or roast pork, along with local wines. Two of France's best known wine-growing regions are located near the city: the Beaujolais region to the north and the Côtes du Rhône region to the south. Another Lyon tradition is a type of brunch food called "mâchons", made of local charcuterie and usually accompanied by Beaujolais red wine. Mâchons were the customary meal of the canuts, the city's silk workers, who ate a late-morning meal after they finished their shifts in the factories.

Other traditional local dishes include quenelle; gras double; salade lyonnaise (lettuce with bacon, croûtons and a poached egg); and the sausage-based rosette lyonnaise and andouillette. Popular local confections include marron glacé and coussin de Lyon. Cervelle de canut (literally, "silk worker's brains") is a cheese spread/dip made of a base of fromage blanc, seasoned with chopped herbs, shallots, salt, pepper, olive oil and vinegar.

More recently, French tacos appears to have been invented in the early 2000s in the Lyon suburb Vaulx-en-Velin, though it might plausibly have been invented in nearby Grenoble. This street food became popular in the Lyon region and then across France; it is now famous worldwide.

=== Sport ===
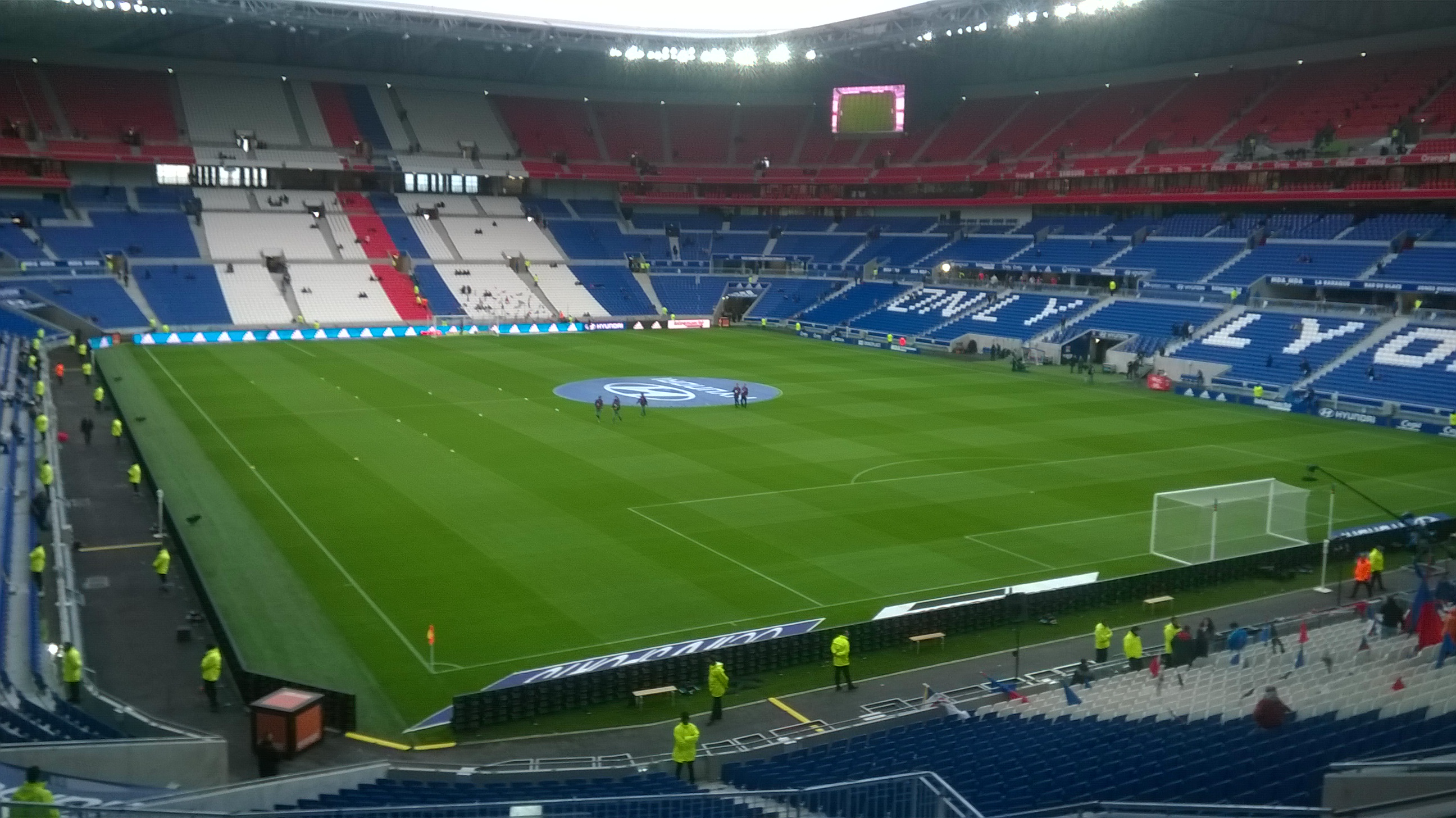
Parc Olympique Lyonnais

Lyon is home to the football club Olympique Lyonnais (OL), whose men's team plays in Ligue 1 and has won the championship of that competition seven times, all consecutively from 2002 to 2008. OL played until December 2015 at the 43,000-seat Stade de Gerland, which also hosted matches of the 1998 FIFA World Cup. Since 2016, the team has played at the Parc Olympique Lyonnais, a 59,000-seat stadium located in the eastern suburb of Décines-Charpieu. OL operates a women's team, OL Lyonnes, which competes in and dominates the Première Ligue. They won fourteen consecutive top-flight championships (2007–2020), and additionally claim the four titles won by the original incarnation of FC Lyon, a women's football club that merged into OL in 2004 (the current FC Lyon was founded in 2009). OL Lyonnes have also won the UEFA Women's Champions League eight times, including in five consecutive editions from 2016 to 2020, and hosted the 2019 FIFA Women's World Cup semi-finals as well as the final on 7 July at Stade de Lyon.

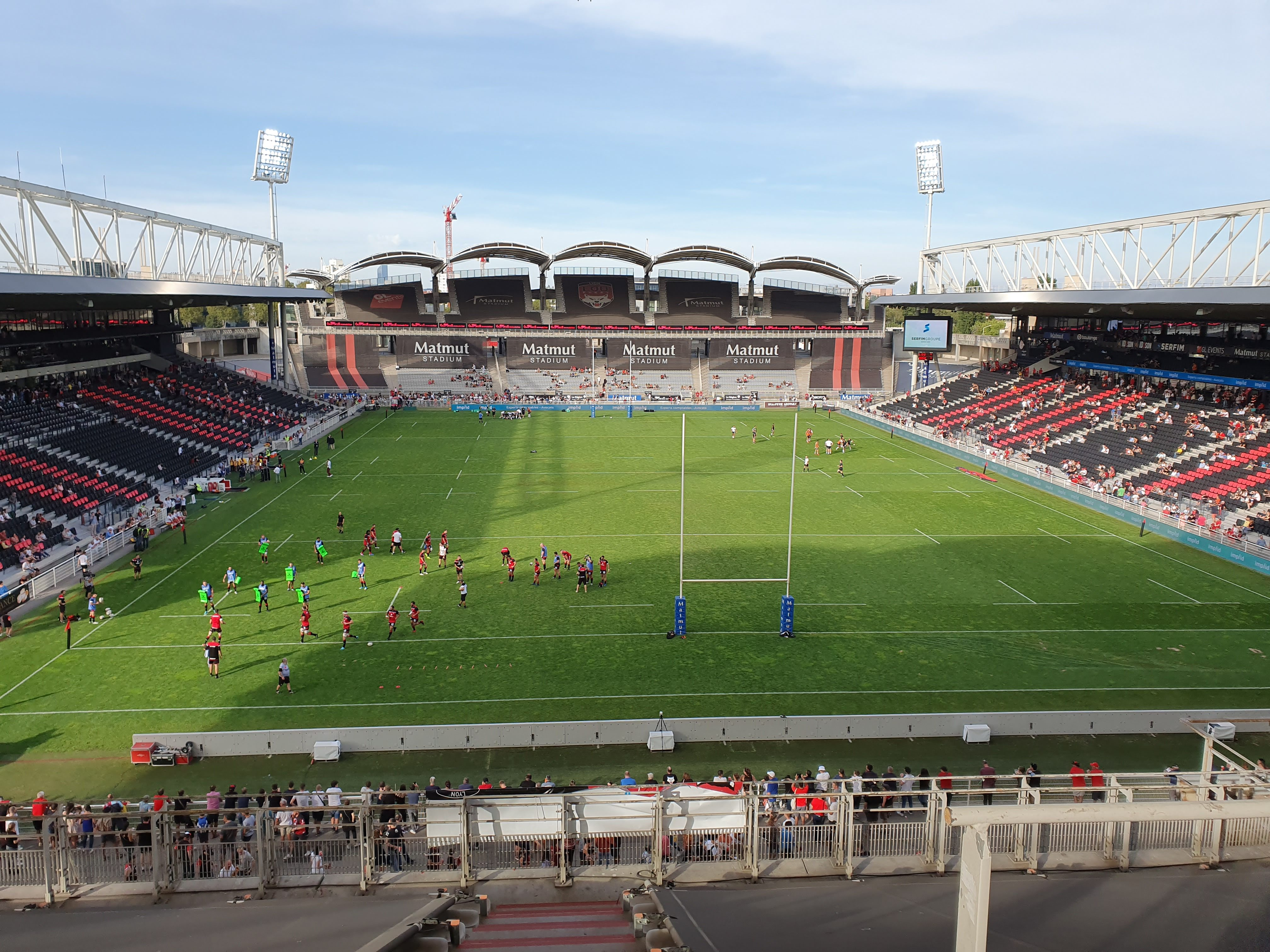
Stade de Gerland

Lyon has a rugby union team, Lyon OU, in the Top 14, which moved into Stade de Gerland full-time in 2017–18. In addition, Lyon has a rugby league side called Lyon Villeurbanne that plays in the French rugby league championship. The club's home is the Stade Georges Lyvet in Villeurbanne.

Lyon is also home to the Lyon Hockey Club, an ice hockey team that competes in France's national ice hockey league. The Patinoire Charlemagne is the seat of Club des Sports de Glace de Lyon, the club of Olympic ice dancing champions Marina Anissina and Gwendal Peizerat, and world champions Isabelle Delobel and Olivier Shoenfelder. Lyon-Villeurbanne also has a basketball team, ASVEL, that plays at the Astroballe arena.

Lyon is will host the indoor ice during the 2030 Winter Olympics following the decision to move those events out of Nice. Several venues in Lyon are set to be used.

=== Street art ===
Since 2000, Birdy Kids, a group of graffiti artists from the city, has decorated several random buildings and walls along the Lyon ring road. In 2012, the artist collective was chosen to represent the city as its cultural ambassadors.

=== Media ===
France's national public television network has a television station in the city which broadcast local television programmes on France 3 Auvergne-Rhône-Alpes. Local radio is served by Radio Espace that broadcast on 96.9 FM. The local newspapers are Le Progrès and Lyon Capitale.

== Demographics ==
As of 2011, 14% of its population was born outside Metropolitan France.

Population of Lyon (commune)
(within 2020 borders)

Year	Pop.	±% p.a.
1801	101,760	—
1806	114,643	+2.41%
1821	149,611	+1.79%
1831	182,668	+2.02%
1836	198,683	+1.60%
1841	206,670	+0.79%
1846	238,466	+2.86%
1851	259,220	+1.68%
1856	293,743	+2.66%
1861	320,326	+1.72%
1866	325,219	+0.30%
1872	324,590	−0.03%

Year	Pop.	±% p.a.
1876	344,513	+1.33%
1881	378,581	+1.84%
1886	404,172	+1.45%
1891	440,315	+1.78%
1896	468,311	+1.25%
1901	461,687	−0.29%
1906	474,652	+0.56%
1911	462,248	−0.53%
1921	462,446	+0.00%
1926	463,125	+0.03%
1931	463,647	+0.02%
1936	463,061	−0.03%

Year	Pop.	±% p.a.
1946	464,104	+0.02%
1954	475,343	+0.29%
1962	535,746	+1.54%
1968	527,800	−0.25%
1975	456,716	−2.06%
1982	413,095	−1.42%
1990	415,487	+0.07%
1999	445,452	+0.78%
2007	472,330	+0.75%
2012	496,343	+1.00%
2017	516,092	+0.78%
2023	519,127	+0.10%

All figures come from population censuses. Figures from 1911 to 1936 (incl.) are the redressed figures calculated by INSEE to correct the overestimated population of Lyon published by the municipal authorities at the time (10,000s of false residents had been added by the municipal authorities to artificially inflate the population figures and remain the 2nd largest city of France ahead of Marseille). The 1906 figure is the one published by the municipal authorities, probably already inflated, but not corrected by INSEE because the overestimate was smaller than 10,000.
Source: EHESS and INSEE

The city of Lyon and 58 suburban municipalities have formed since 2015 the Metropolis of Lyon, a directly elected metropolitan authority now in charge of most urban issues, with a population of 1,436,354 in 2023.

Population of Lyon (metropolis)
(59 communes, within 2020 borders)

Year	Pop.	±% p.a.
1861	418,515	—
1866	427,522	+0.43%
1872	426,552	−0.04%
1876	453,540	+1.37%
1881	493,778	+1.66%
1886	527,621	+1.47%
1891	566,115	+1.46%
1896	600,881	+1.21%
1901	608,856	+0.26%

Year	Pop.	±% p.a.
1906	627,073	+0.60%
1911	629,931	+0.09%
1921	659,007	+0.45%
1926	691,446	+0.97%
1931	743,297	+1.46%
1936	738,220	−0.14%
1946	746,062	+0.11%
1954	790,662	+0.71%
1962	947,569	+2.34%

Year	Pop.	±% p.a.
1968	1,077,794	+2.17%
1975	1,153,402	+0.98%
1982	1,138,718	−0.18%
1990	1,166,797	+0.30%
1999	1,199,589	+0.31%
2007	1,263,247	+0.66%
2012	1,324,637	+0.95%
2017	1,385,927	+0.91%
2023	1,436,354	+0.60%

All figures come from population censuses. Figures from 1911 to 1936 (incl.) are computed using the redressed figures for the commune of Lyon calculated by INSEE to correct the overestimated population of Lyon published by the municipal authorities at the time (10,000s of false residents had been added by the municipal authorities to artificially inflate the population figures and remain the 2nd largest city of France ahead of Marseille). The 1906 figure is computed using the figure for the commune of Lyon published by the municipal authorities, probably already inflated, but not corrected by INSEE because the overestimate was smaller than 10,000.
Source: EHESS and INSEE

=== Foreign-born ===
Foreign-born population in Lyon by country of birth
Country of birth	Population (2020)
Algeria	14,779
Morocco	5,245
Tunisia	4,879
Italy	3,351
Portugal	3,068
Spain	2,064
DR Congo	1,520
China	1,429
Cameroon	1,364
Senegal	1,198

== Education ==
=== Universities and tertiary education ===
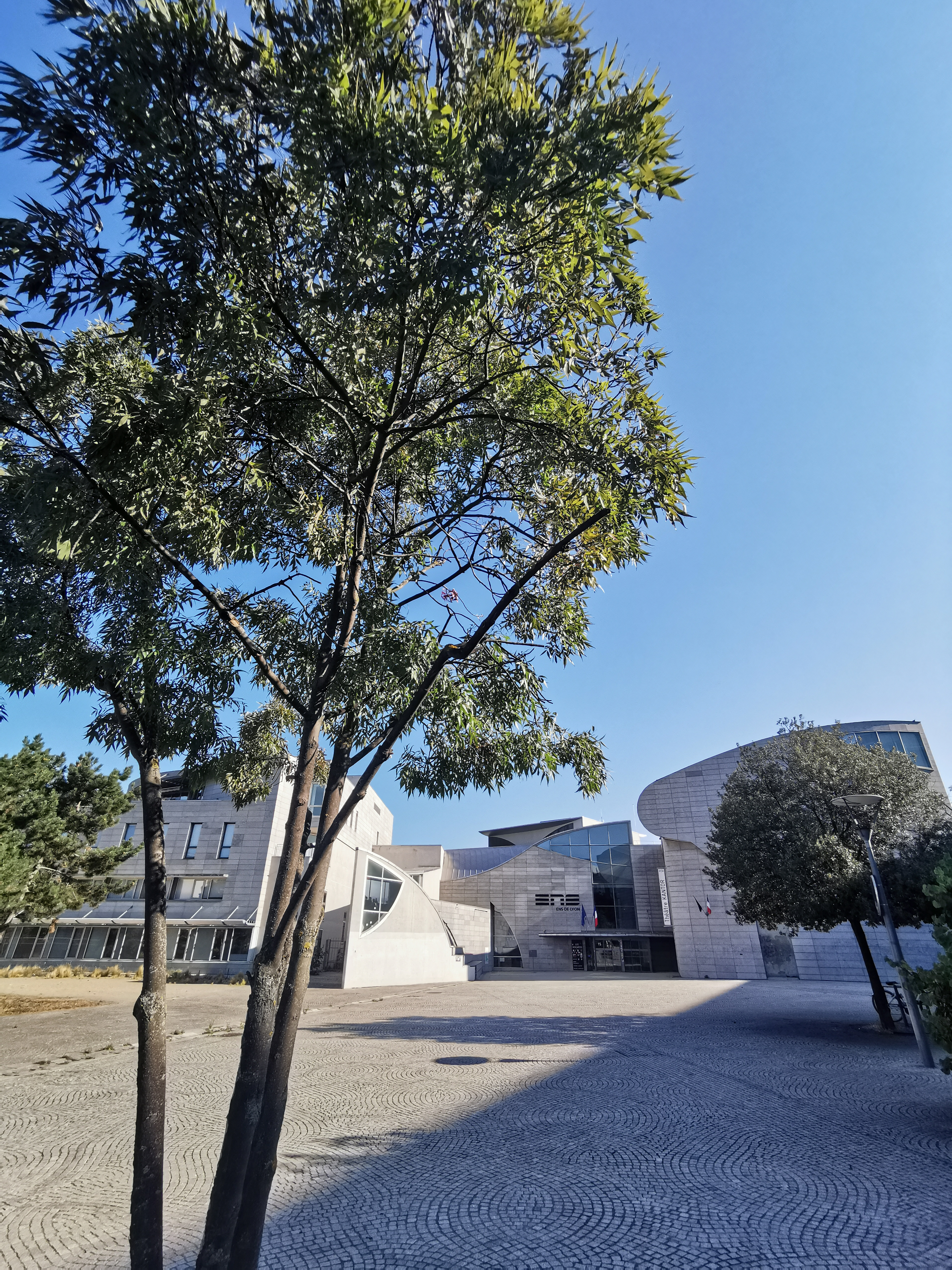
ENS Lyon: René Descartes campus

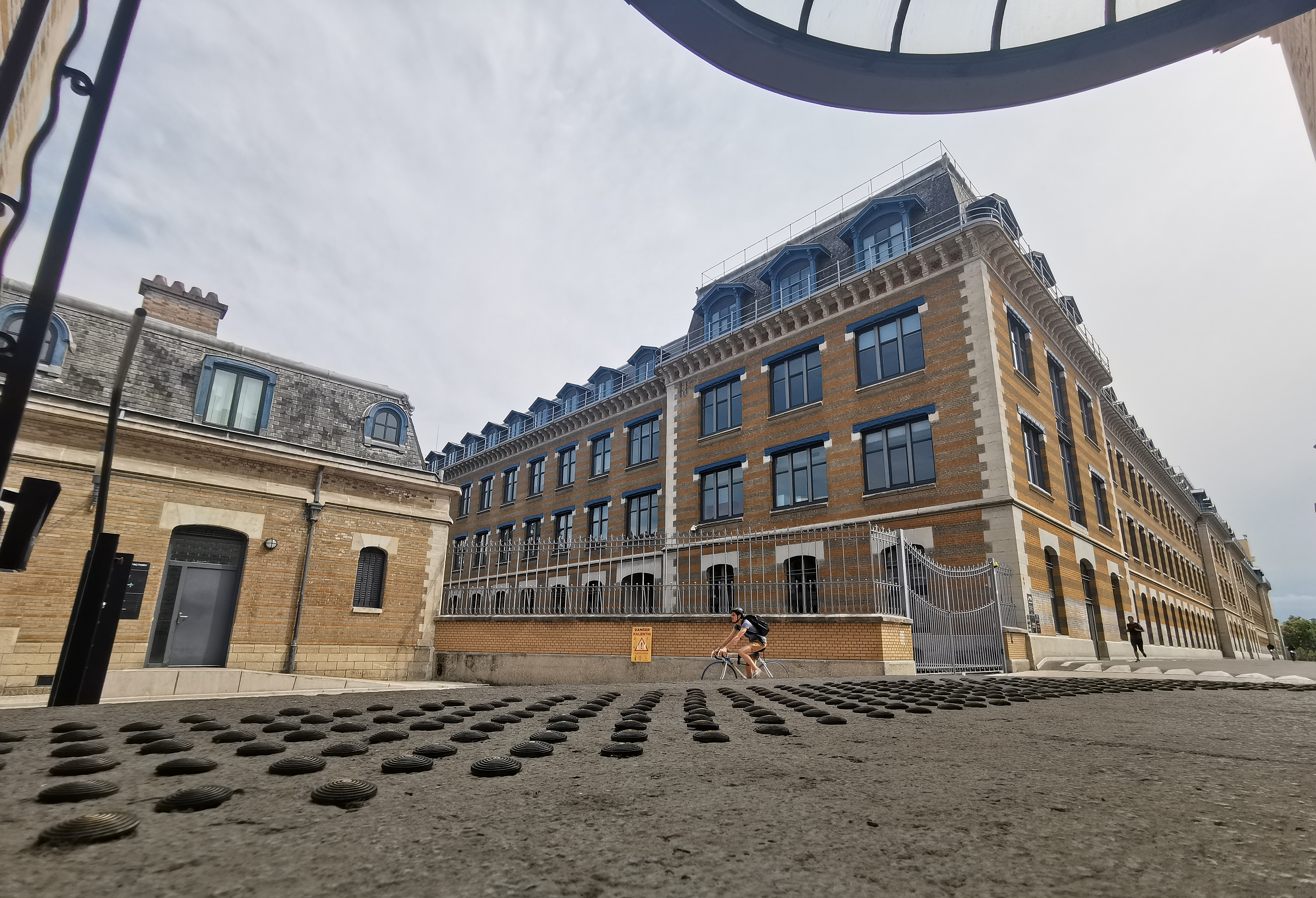
Lyon 3: Manufacture des Tabacs campus

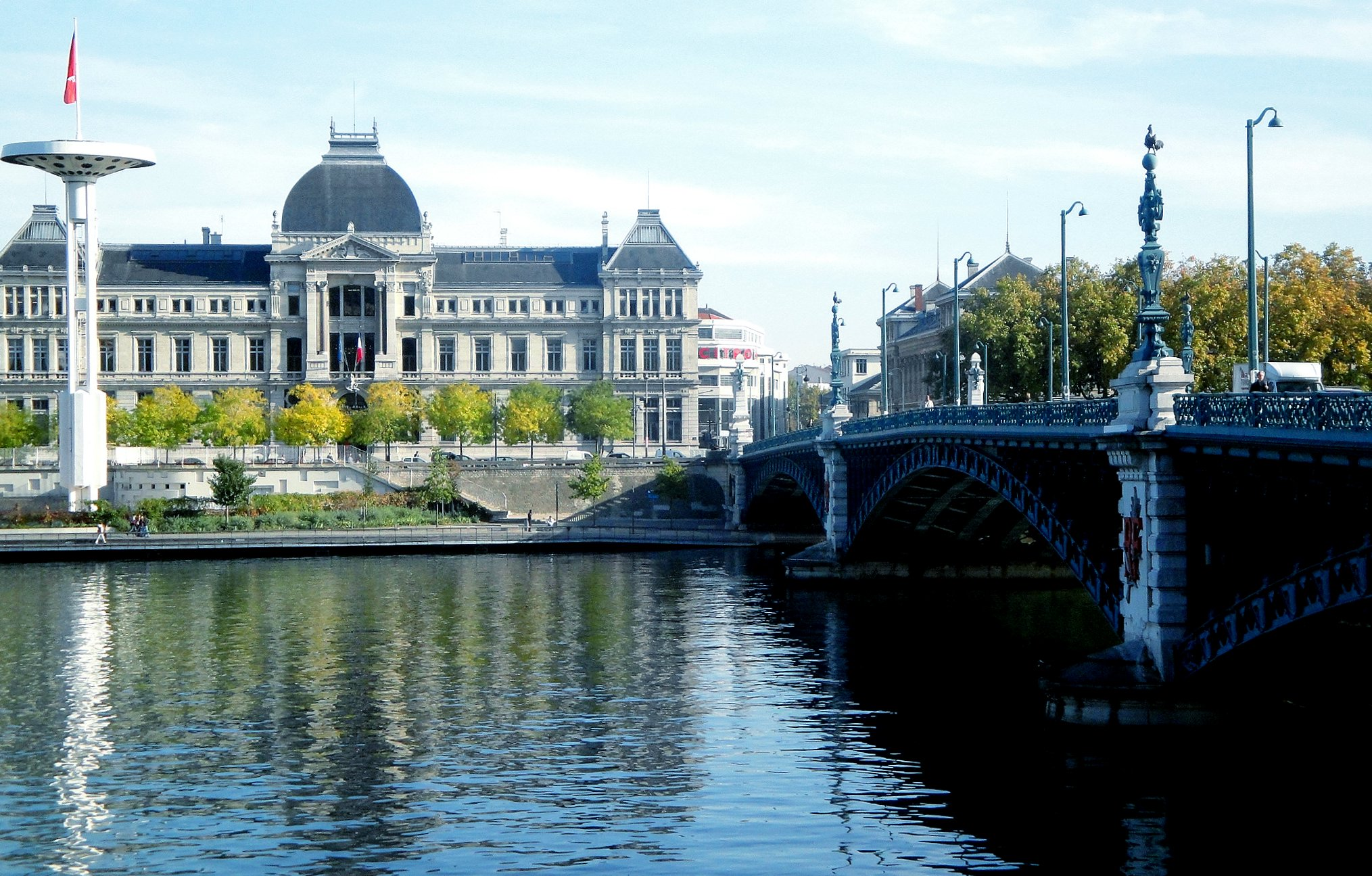
Lyon 3: Berges du Rhône campus

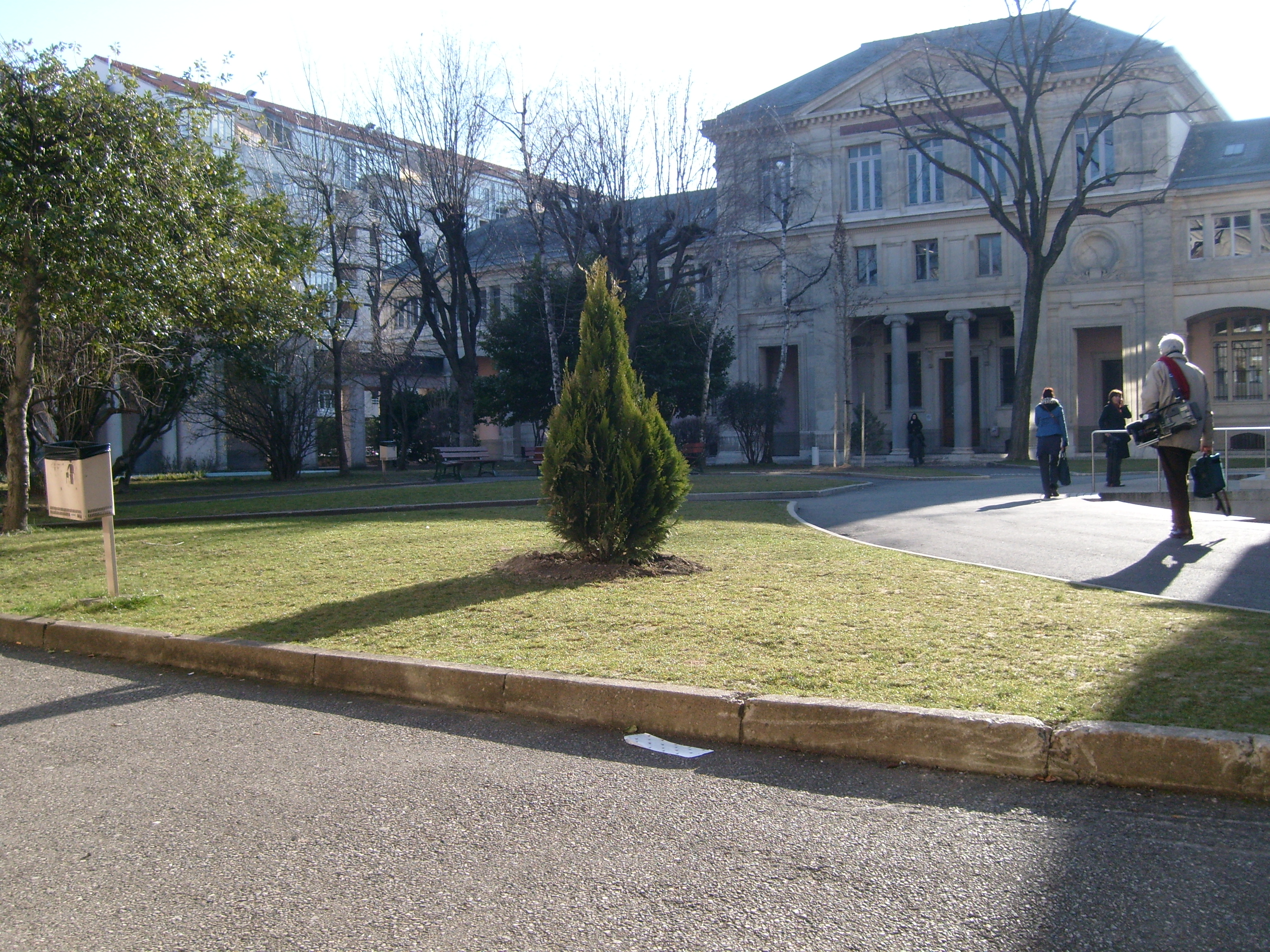
Lyon 2: Berges du Rhône campus

- École Centrale de Lyon;
- École Normale Supérieure de Lyon
- EM Lyon (École de Management de Lyon);
- ECE Lyon (École de Commerce Européenne de Lyon);
- Institut d'études politiques de Lyon (Sciences Po Lyon);
- CPE Lyon;
- CNSMD (Conservatoire national supérieur de musique et de danse de Lyon)
- ECAM Lyon (École Catholique d'Arts et Métiers de Lyon);
- EPITECH;
- EPITA;
- ENTPE (École Nationale des Travaux Publiques de l'État);
- École nationale vétérinaire de Lyon (ENVL);
- ESME-Sudria;
- École des Beaux-Arts;
- E-Artsup;
- INSA Lyon (Institut National des Sciences Appliquées de Lyon);
- Polytech Lyon;
- Institut supérieur européen de gestion group;
- ISARA (Institut Supérieur d'Agriculture Rhône Alpes);
- Institution des Chartreux;
- Institut polytechnique des sciences avancées;
- Université Claude Bernard (Lyon 1);
- Université Lumière (Lyon 2);
- Université Jean Moulin (Lyon 3);
- IAE (Institut d'Administration des Entreprises de Lyon);
- Institut Sup'Biotech de Paris;
- Catholic University of Lyon;
- ESDES Business School;
- IDRAC (International School of Management);
- Wesford Graduate Business School;
- IFAG (Business Management School);
- Institut supérieur européen de formation par l'action;
- Le Lycée du Parc;
- La Martinière Lyon;
- Web@cademie;
- CEESO (Centre Européen d'Enseignement Supérieur de l'Ostéopathie);
- Bellecour, Écoles D'Arts.

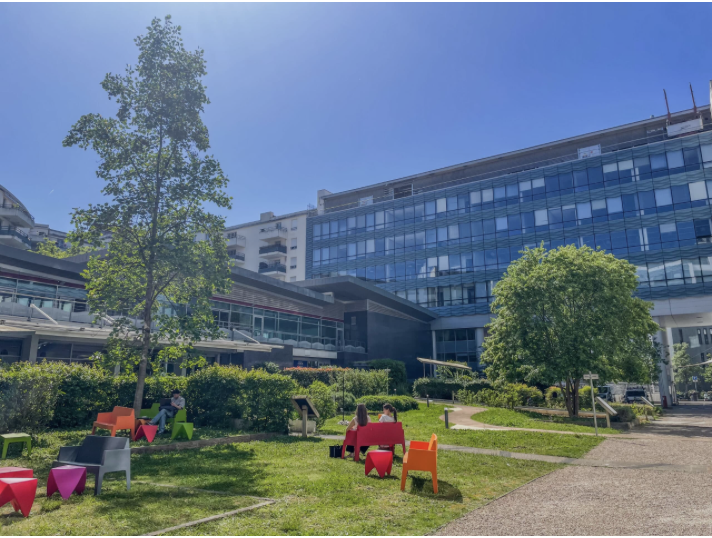
IPSA Lyon Campus

=== Primary and secondary schools ===
There are some international private schools in the Lyon area, including:

- Cité Scolaire Internationale de Lyon or the Lycée de Gerland;
  - Includes the Section Japonaises (リヨン・ジェルラン補習授業校 Riyon Jeruran Hoshū Jugyō Kō "Lyon Gerland Japanese Supplementary School"), which the Japanese Ministry of Education (MEXT) counts as a part-time Japanese supplementary school
- Ombrosa;
- International School of Lyon in nearby Sainte-Foy-lès-Lyon;
- Montessori School of Lyon.

=== Supplementary education ===
Other Japanese supplementary schools:

- The Association Pour le Développement de la Langue et de la Culture Japonaises (ADLCJ; リヨン補習授業校 Riyon Hoshū Jugyō Kō) is held in the Maison Berty Albrecht in Villeurbanne, near Lyon. It was formed in 1987. It serves Japanese expatriate children who wish to continue their Japanese education whilst abroad.

== Transport ==
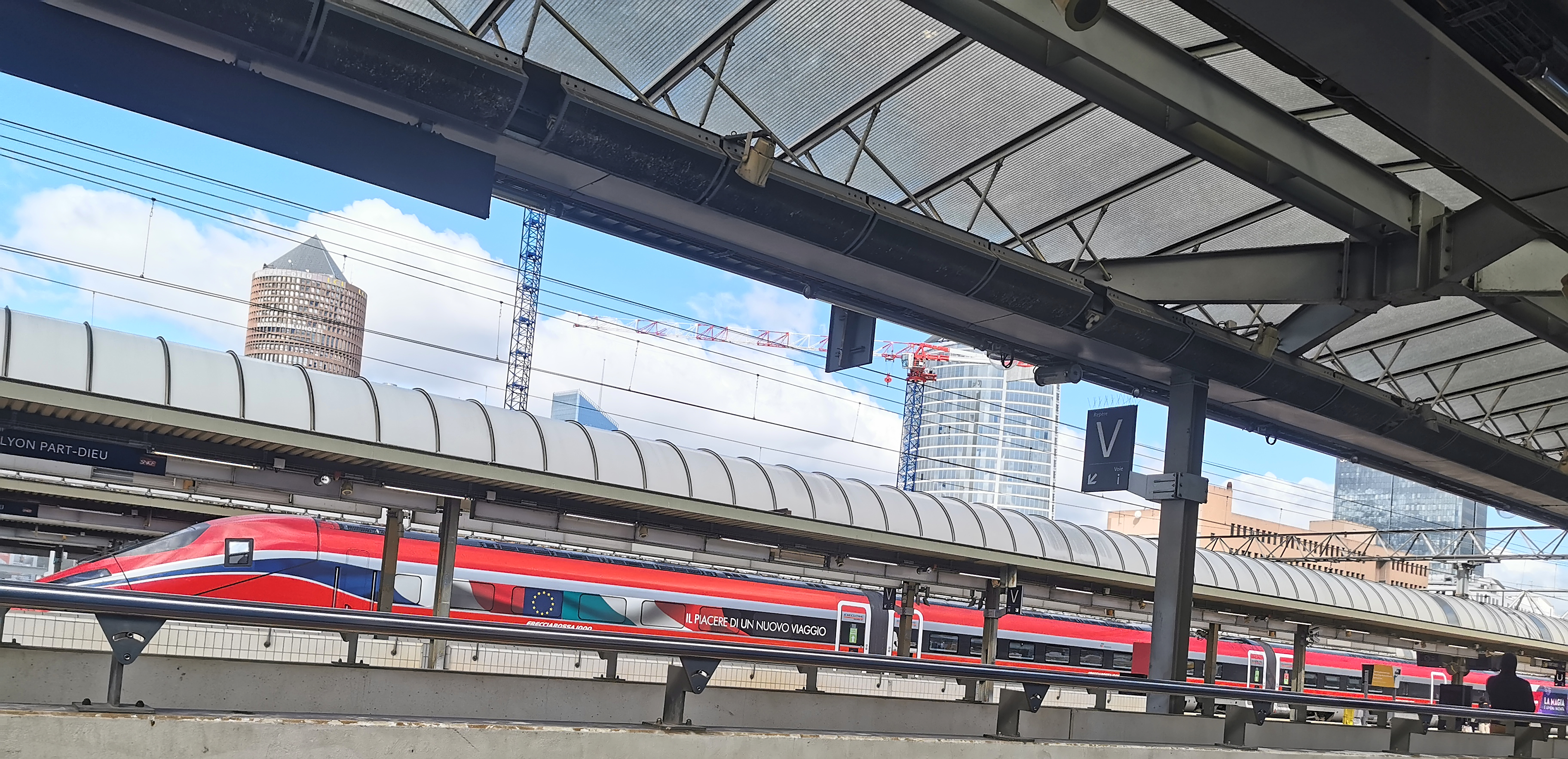
Platform I, Lyon-Part-Dieu train station

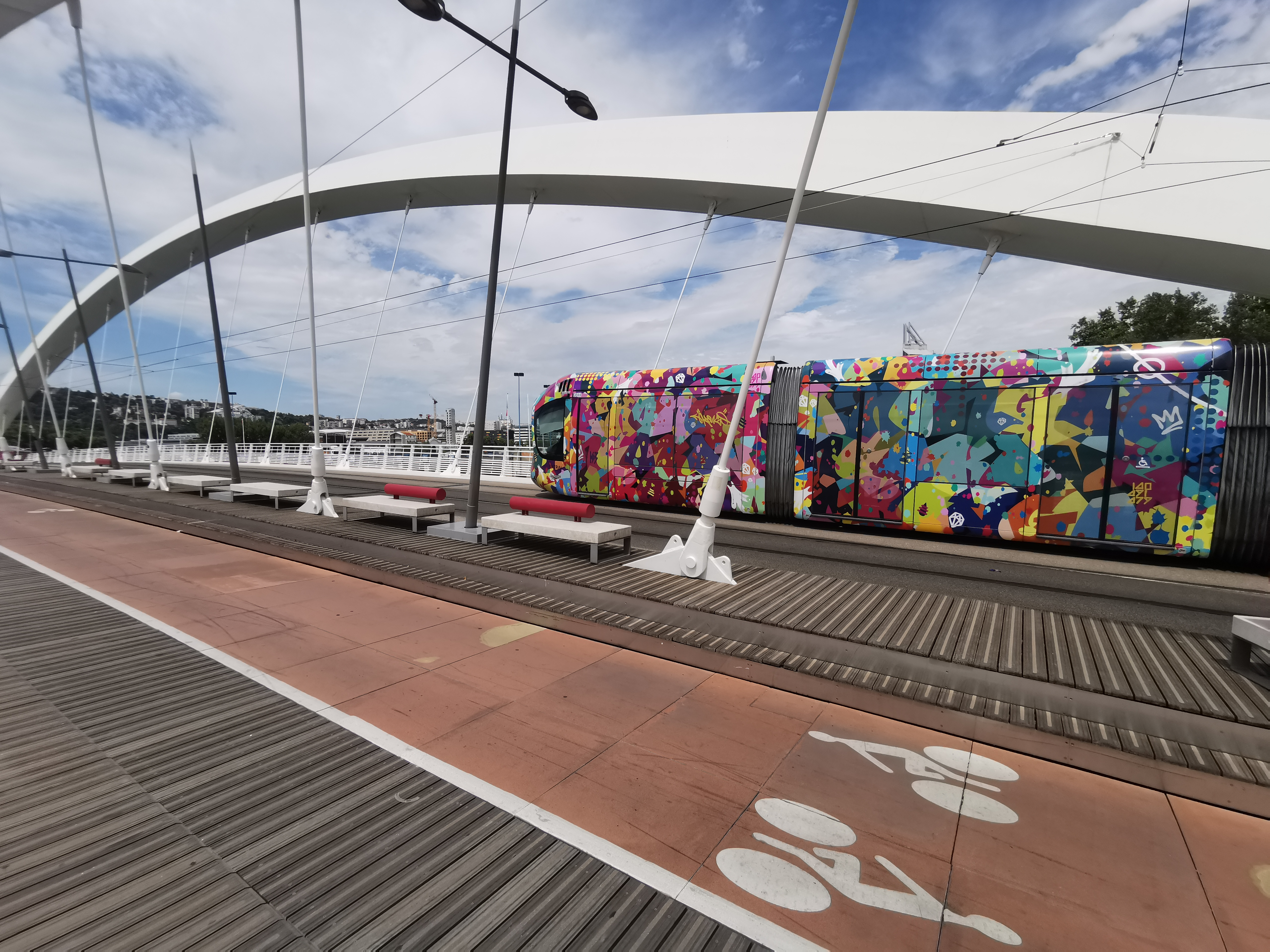
T1 tramway on the Raymond Barre bridge

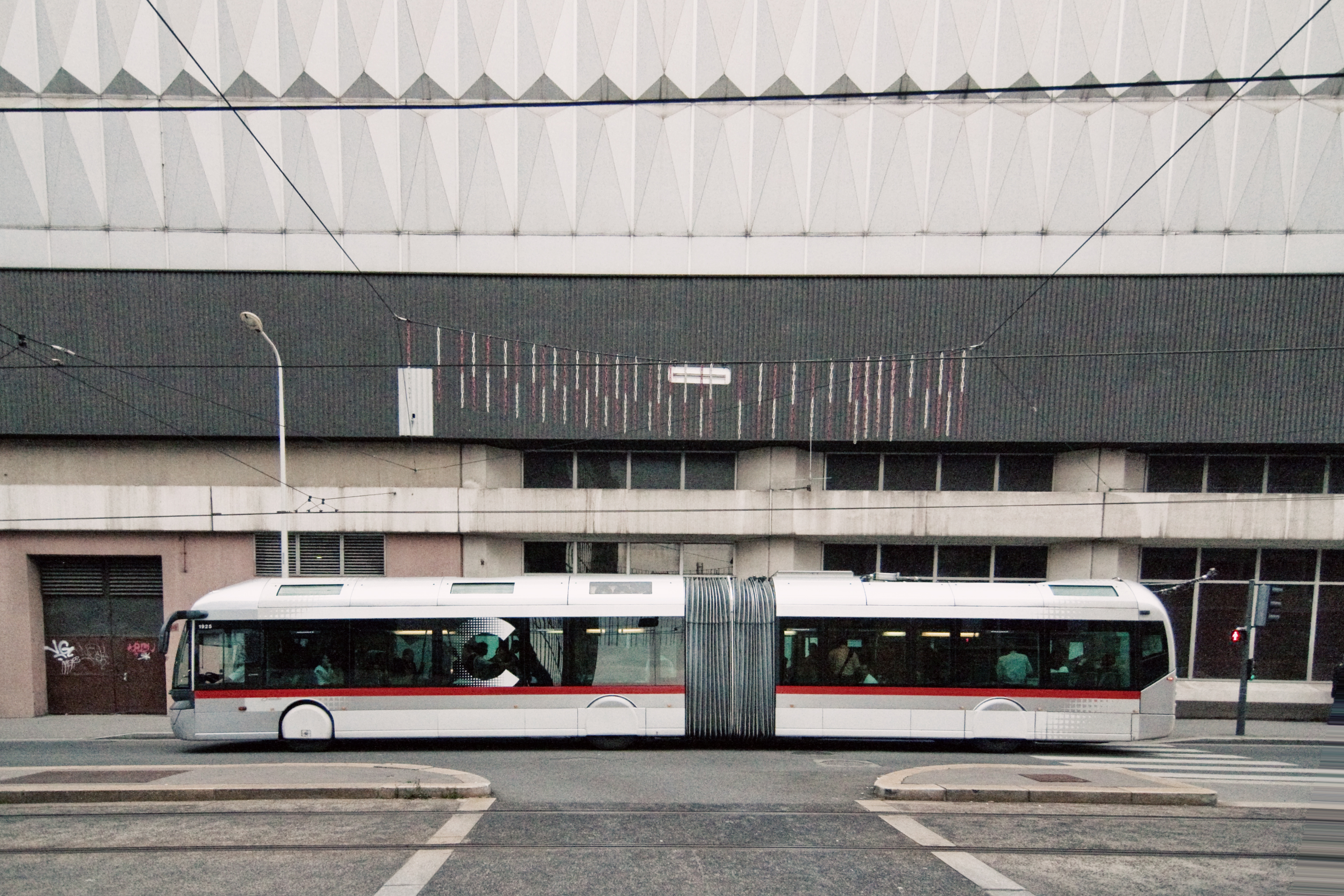
C3 trolleybus in the third district

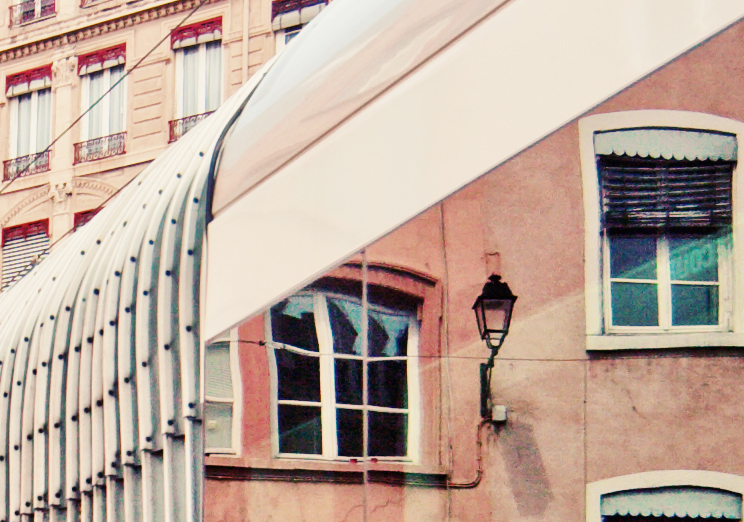
C3 trolleybus in Old Lyon

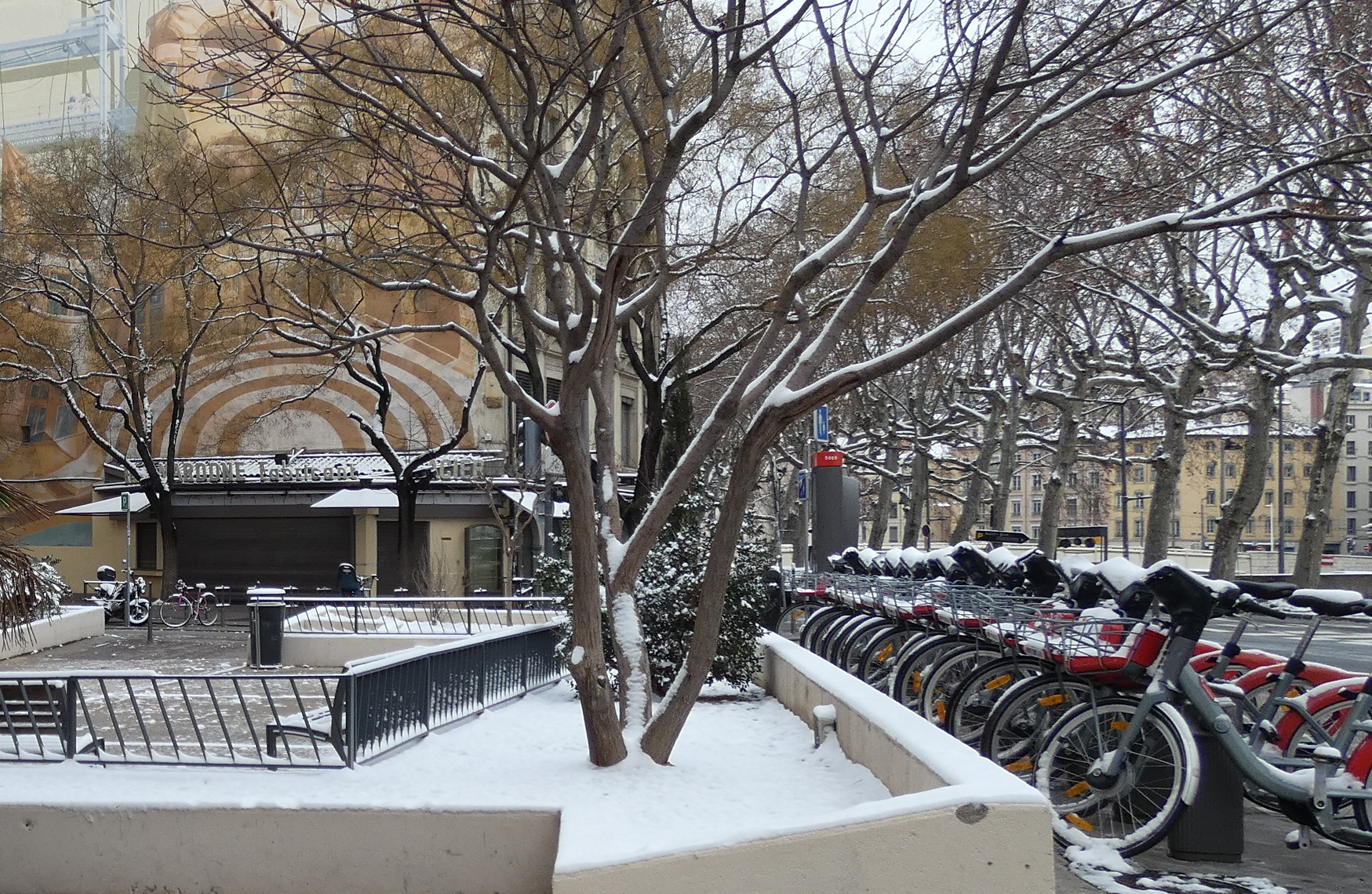
Velo'v, Ennemond Fousseret square (Old Lyon)

Lyon–Saint-Exupéry Airport, located east of Lyon, serves as a base for domestic and international flights. It is a key transport facility for the entire Rhône-Alpes region, with coach links to other cities in the area. The in-house train station Gare de Lyon Saint-Exupéry connects the airport to the nationwide TGV network. The Rhônexpress tram monopoly links the airport with the business quarter of La Part Dieu in less than 30 minutes, and offers connections with Underground A & B, Tramway T1, T3 & T4, and bus lines. Lyon public transport Sytral offers a bus service, Route 47, that links the airport to Meyzieu where passengers can change onto Tram T3. The regular price of public transport is €1.90, as opposed to €15 one way for the Rhonexpress. In the suburb of Bron, the smaller Lyon-Bron Airport provides an alternative for domestic aviation.

Lyon has two major railway stations: Lyon-Part-Dieu, which was built to accommodate the TGV, and Lyon-Perrache, an older station that now provides mostly regional service. Smaller railway stations include Lyon-Gorge-de-Loup, Lyon-Vaise, Lyon-Saint-Paul and Lyon-Jean Macé. Lyon was the first city to be connected to Paris by the TGV in 1981. Since that time the TGV train network has expanded and links Lyon directly to Perpignan, Toulouse, Nice, Marseille, Strasbourg, Nantes and Lille. International trains operate directly to Madrid, Barcelona, Milan, Turin, Geneva, Frankfurt, Luxembourg, Brussels (formerly to London, now withdrawn).

The city is at the heart of a dense road network and is located at the meeting point of several highways: A6 to Paris, A7 Marseille, A42 to Geneva, and A43 to Grenoble. The city is now bypassed by the A46. A double motorway tunnel passes under Fourvière, connecting the A6 and the A7 autoroutes, both forming the "Autoroute du Soleil".

The Perrache railway station serves as an intermodal transportation hub for tramways, local and regional trains and city buses, the terminus of Metro line A, of the Tramway T2, the bicycle service Vélo'v, and taxis.

The Transports en commun lyonnais (TCL), Lyon's public transit system, consisting of metro, tramways and buses, serves 62 communes of the Lyon metropolis. The metro network has four lines (A, B, C and D), 42 stations, and runs with a frequency of up to a train every 2 minutes. There are eight Lyon tram lines since november 2020: T1 from Debourg in the south to IUT-Feyssine in the north, Tram T2 from Hôtel de région Montrochet to Saint-Priest in the south-east, Tram T3 from Part-Dieu to Meyzieu, Tram T4 from 'Hôptial Feyzin Venissieux' to La Doua Gaston Berger. Tram T5 from Grange Blanche, in the south-east to Eurexpo in the south-west. Tram T6 from Debourg, in the south to Hôpitaux Est-Pinel in the east. Tram T7 from Vaux-en-Velin la soie, in the north-east to Décines – OL Vallée in the east. And Rhône Express tramline from Part-Dieu to Lyon–Saint-Exupéry Airport. The Lyon bus network consists of the Lyon trolleybus system, motorbuses, and coaches for areas outside the centre. There are also two funicular lines from Vieux Lyon to Saint-Just and Fourvière. The ticketing system is relatively simple as the city has only one public transport operator, the SYTRAL.

The public transit system was complemented in 2005 by Vélo'v, a bicycle network providing a low-cost bicycle-hire service made up of 340 stations throughout the city. Borrowing a bicycle for less than 30 minutes is free. Free rental time can be extended for another 30 minutes at any station. Lyon was the first city in France to introduce this bicycle renting system. In 2011, the Auto'lib car rental service was introduced. It worked much the same way as the Velo'v but for cars. It closed in 2018.

The average amount of time people spend commuting with public transit in Lyon on a weekday is 45 minutes. The average amount of time people wait at a stop or station for public transit is 11 min, while 17% of riders wait for over 20 minutes on average every day. The average distance people usually ride in a single trip with public transit is 4.7 km, while 4% travel for over 12 km in a single direction.

=== Maps ===
Network of highways around Lyon

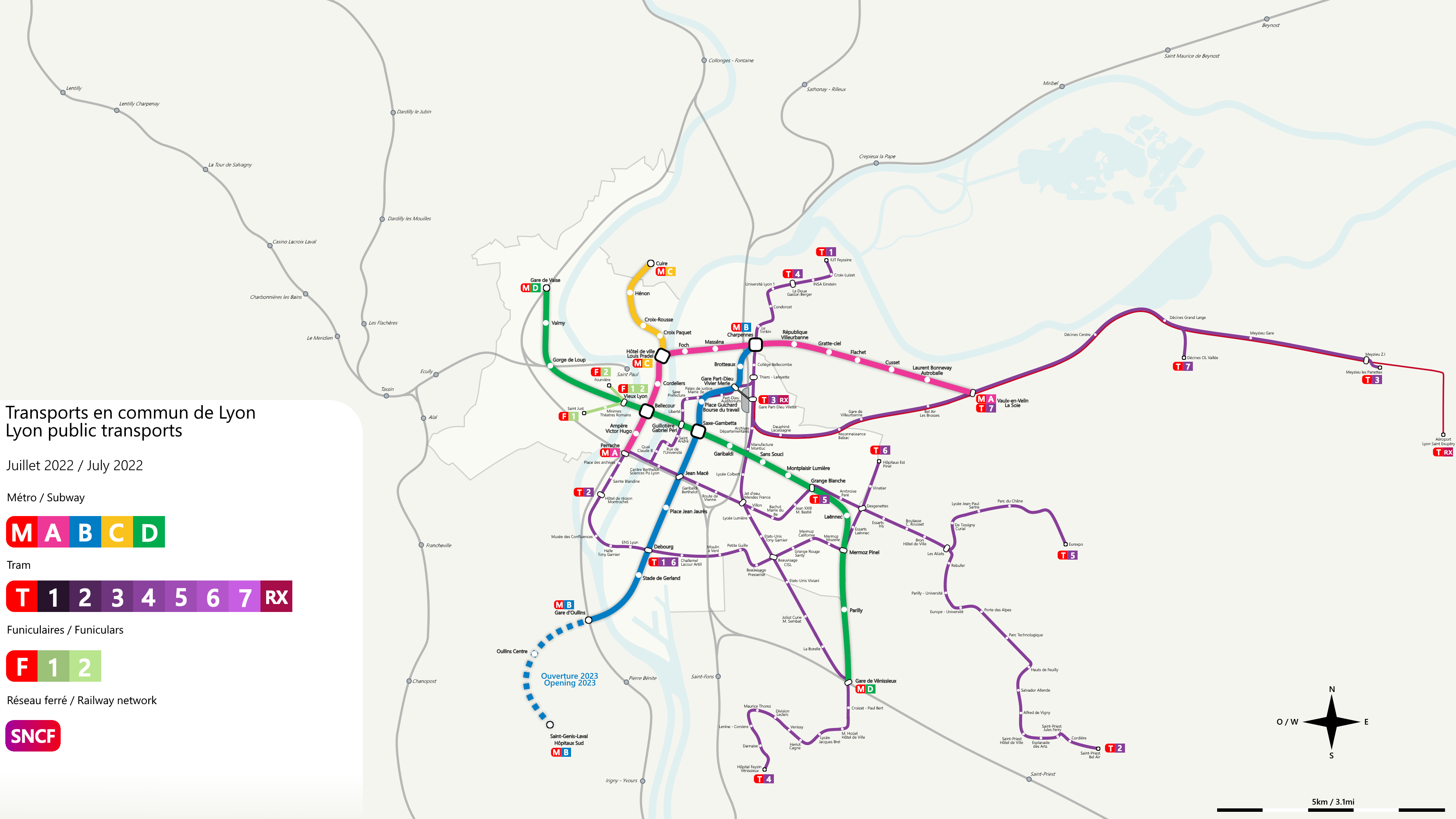
Public transport map

== International relations ==
Lyon is a pilot city of the Council of Europe and the European Commission "Intercultural cities" program. Lyon is twinned with:

- Paterson, New Jersey, United States
- Addis Ababa, Ethiopia
- Bamako, Mali
- Barcelona, Spain
- Beersheba, Israel
- Birmingham, England
- Boston, United States
- Craiova, Romania
- Curitiba, Brazil
- Frankfurt, Germany, since 1960
- Gothenburg, Sweden
- Guangzhou, China, since 1988
- Haute Matsiatra, Madagascar
- Ho Chi Minh City, Vietnam, since 1997
- Jericho, Palestine
- Leipzig, Germany, since 1981
- Łódź, Poland, since 1991
- Melbourne, Australia
- Milan, Italy, since 1966
- Montreal, Canada, since 1979
- Oran, Algeria
- Osaka, Japan, since 1984
- Ouagadougou, Burkina Faso
- Pontianak, Indonesia
- Porto-Novo, Benin
- Rabat, Morocco
- St. Louis, United States
- Saint Petersburg, Russia
- Sétif, Algeria
- Tinca, Romania
- Toronto, Canada
- Turin, Italy
- Yerevan, Armenia, since 1992
- Yokohama, Japan, since 1959

== See also ==
- List of films set in Lyon
- List of streets and squares in Lyon
- Mères of France
- Montchat
- Occupation of Saint-Nizier church by Lyon prostitutes
- History of silk production in Lyon

== Bibliography ==
- Bouhey, Vivien (2009), Les Anarchistes contre la République [The Anarchists against the Republic], Rennes: Presses universitaires de Rennes (PUR)
