= Feast of Wonders =

Religious and pagan ceremony in Lyon

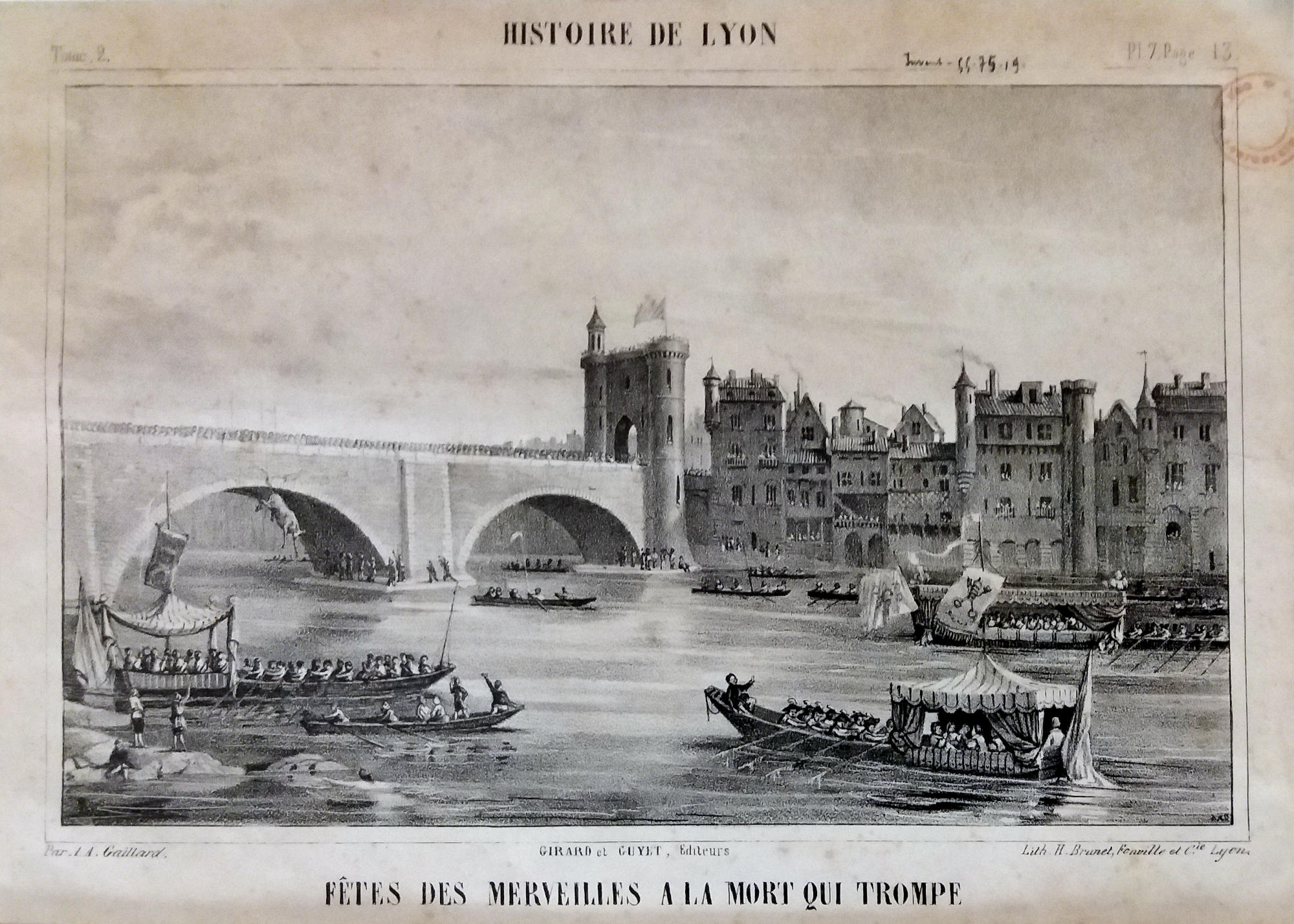
Fête des Merveilles, fantastical representation by A-A. Gaillard. 19th-century lithograph, Musée Gadagne.

The Feast of Wonders or Feast of Miracles is both a religious and pagan ceremony that took place in Lyon on the banks of the Saône during part of the Middle Ages. It is inextricably linked with Saint Pothin's Day, a day of homage to the martyrs of Lyon in 177.

Celebrations associated with Wonders are attested from the middle of the ninth century to the end of the fourteenth century. A few details are known about religious solemnities, but none about secular festivities. Organized by Lyon's main churches, they consisted of a procession from the primatial church of Saint-Jean through the city, stopping for mass at sites dedicated to the martyrs. The unchanging route ran up the banks of the Saône, from Saint-Jean to Vaise, then down on several boats according to a codified ritual to Ainay, and ended on foot at Saint-Nizier church.

The high cost of the festival in times of war and famine, as well as political conflicts, led to its discontinuation in 1394. Several authors subsequently contributed to the many legends surrounding the festival, which lasted until the end of the 20th century. The historiographical work of Marie-Claude Guigue (collection of historical documents) and Jacques Rossiaud has helped to re-establish the facts.

== Name ==
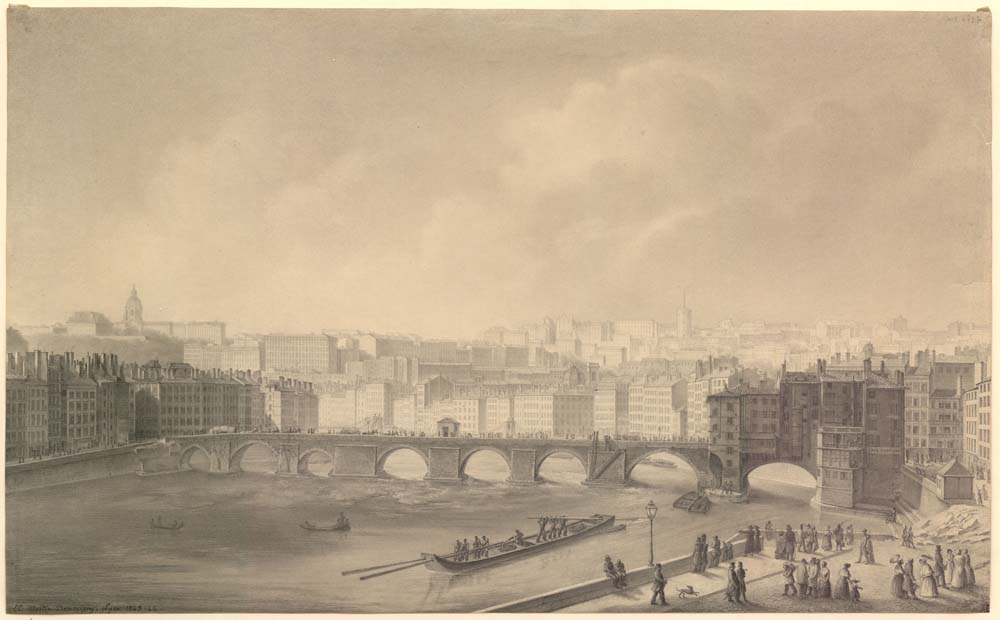
The Pont du Change before 1840, a boat about to pass under the marvelous arch (E. C. Martin-Daussigny, 1846).

The two names are used interchangeably, as para-synonyms for the same rituals, the "Miracula" (Feast of Miracles) having more to do with the religious deeds of the martyrs, and the "Mirabilia" (Feast of Wonders) having more to do with nature and secular beliefs. Indeed, in the tradition of the cult of the martyrs of 177, Gregory of Tours reports a miraculous apparition of the martyrs above the Rhône, asking that their relics be removed from the river.

The Pont du Change, the only bridge over the Saône at the time, had only one navigable arch (on the Saint-Nizier church side). This only possible passage for boats also featured a rapid nicknamed the "Mort-qui-trompe" (the deceiver). In the Middle Ages, this arch was known as the "marvelous arch", according to the feast.

== History ==
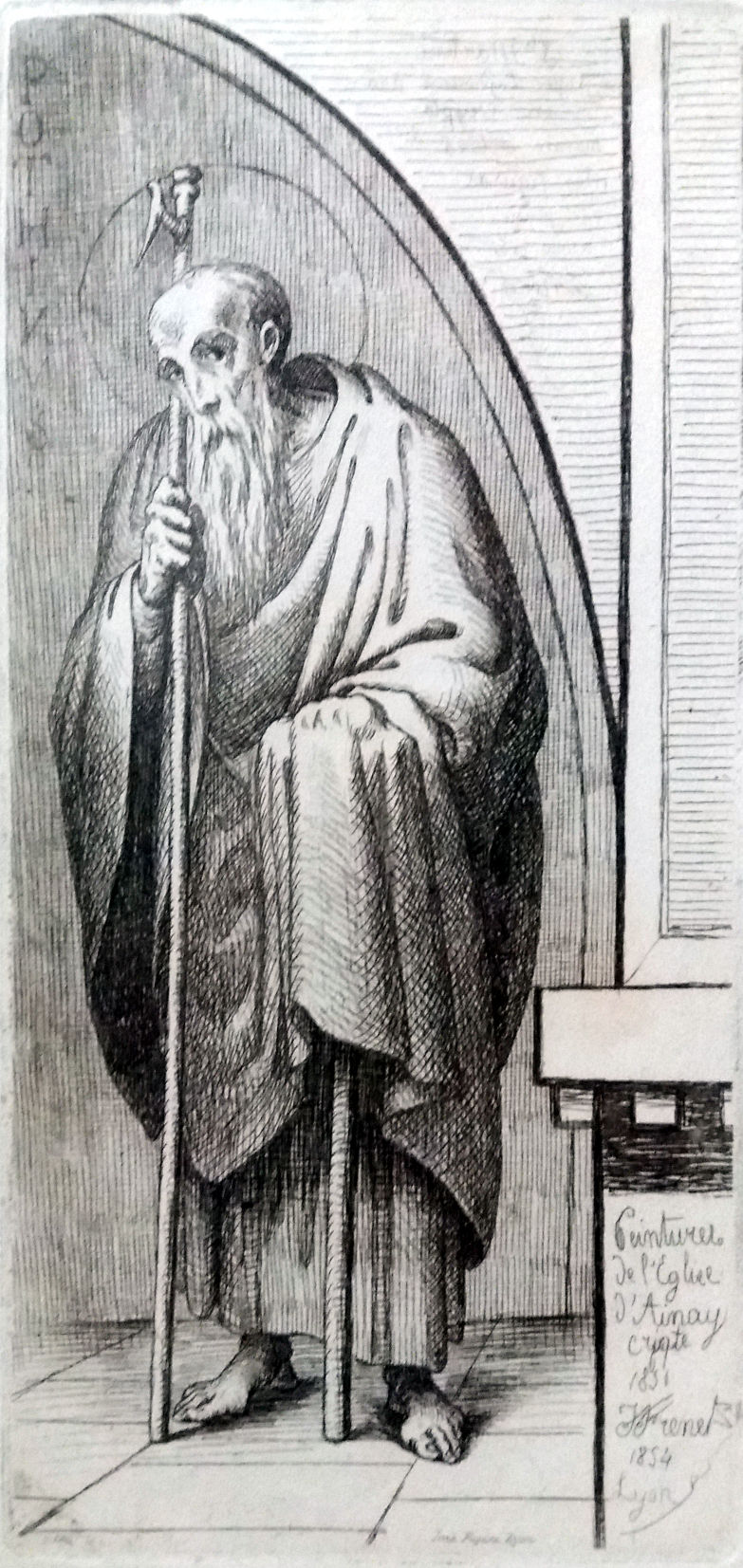
Etching depicting Saint Pothin, based on frescoes by Jean-Baptiste Frénet, 1854, Musées Gadagne.

The feast of Wonders was part of a long tradition of sanctifying and celebrating water, particularly around the Rhône. It has its roots in the miracles associated with the martyrs of Lyon, and continues into modern times with water jousting.

This feast, which took place on June 2, St. Pothin's day, but also three weeks later, is therefore a Catholic tradition, recorded by Gregory of Tours and later by Ado of Vienne, (Note: In his Martyrology. For a modern edition, see: Saint Adon, dom Jacques Dubois; Geneviève Renaud (1984). Le Martyrologe d'Adon: ses deux familles, ses trois recensions: texte et commentaire. Sources d'histoire médiévale (in Latin). Paris: Centre national de la recherche scientifique. ISBN 2-222-03188-5.) even if its course and significance have changed over the centuries. Indeed, since the death of the martyrs, many miracles were witnessed and celebrated in the city. Adon de Vienne described the festival as follows: on June 2, "the citizens of Lyon and others with them all joyfully celebrate this feast, which by an old tradition they call the Day of Miracles, with hymns and canticles of thanksgiving that they sing as they float down the Saône, and with religious solemnities in the Church of the Apostles where the ashes of the martyrs are preserved".

From the 13th century onwards, the festival began to be contested because of its high cost. The canons of Saint-Just renounced their participation in 1285, and in 1311 the city of Lyon called for the festival to be abolished. After much criticism and prevarication, the Lyon council put an end to it in 1394.

These processions originated on Rogation days, when the Rhone was celebrated in Lyon, Vienne, Avignon and Arles.

== Date ==
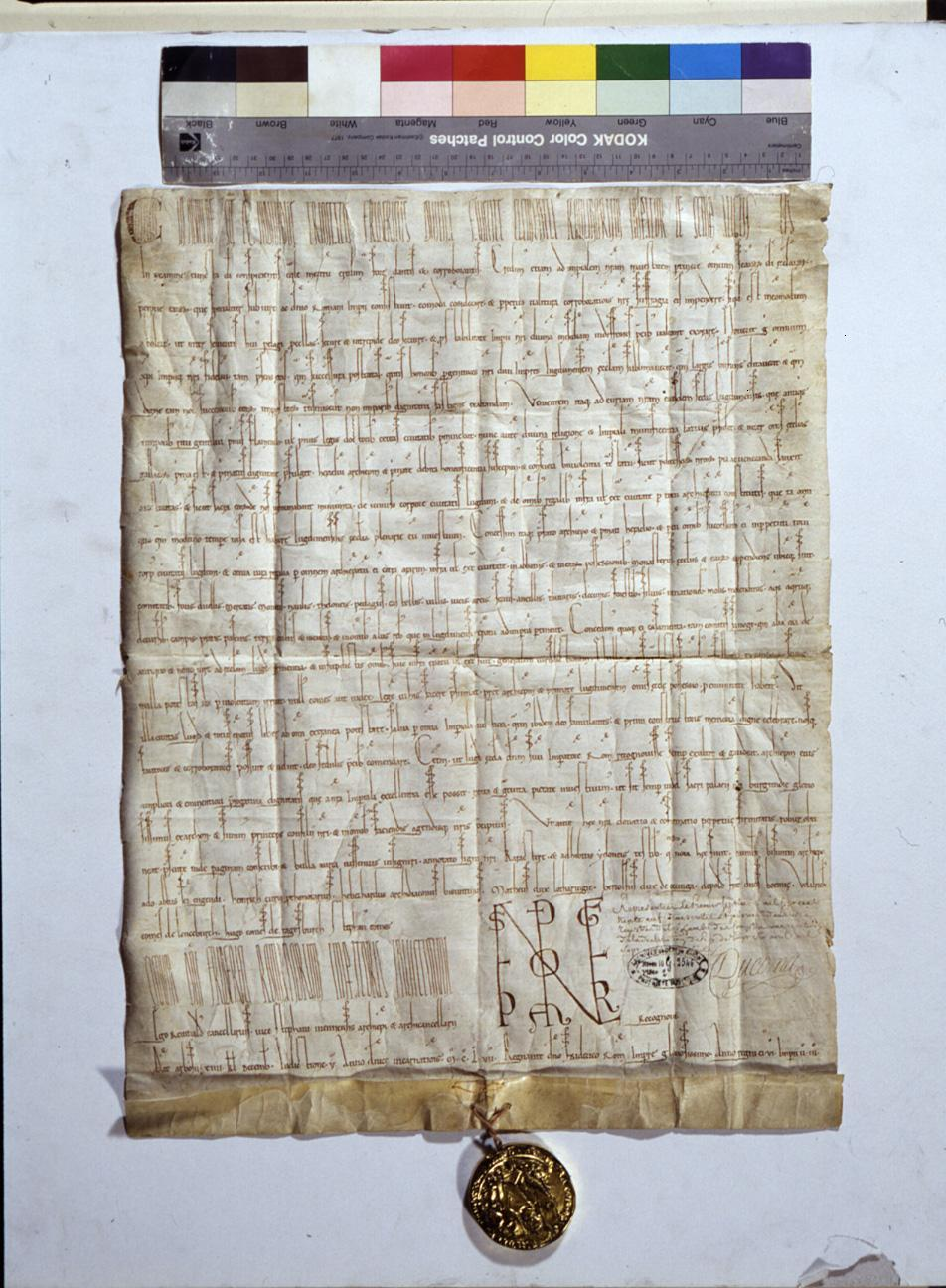
Golden Bull issued by Emperor Frederick Barbarossa on November 18, 1157, Archives départementales du Rhône.

Around the ninth century, the Catholic Church formalized a procession for Saint Pothin, traditionally celebrated on June 2. The last known mention of this date is in the Statutes of St. John of 1175. Around 1300, when the day of celebration was fixed by the archbishop, it was moved to the Monday or Tuesday preceding the day of St. John's nativity, celebrated on June 24.

From the ninth to the twelfth centuries, the Feast of Miracles took place on June 2, unless it fell within a week of Ascension Day, in which case it was moved to June 3. In the 14th century, it took place a few days before Midsummer's Day, generally on Tuesday. The precise day was then decided by the cathedral chapter, in consultation with all the representatives of the groups taking part in the celebrations (secular court officers, sometimes trade masters). Once the decision was taken, "the Chapter gave the order to proclaim the Miracles or Wonders in all places assigned to public cries and to invite all citizens to do their duty, either on the water or in the streets". Tuesday was thus chosen in 1368, 1369, 1370, 1375, 1379 and 1382, and Monday June 20 in 1345.

The move from June 2 to Monday or Tuesday, which fell between the 18th and 21st depending on the year, was probably due to political rivalries. Following recognition of the archbishop's absolute sovereignty over the city of Lyon by Frederick Barbarossa (edict of the Golden Bull of 1157) and the territorial agreements between the archbishop and the Count of Forez (permutatio of 1173), the chapter wanted to assert its authority by controlling the Feast of Wonders in the face of the collegiate churches and monasteries. This change of date enabled the festival to move away from ceremonies linked to the churches of Ainay and Saint-Nizier, and closer to the cathedral. It was also this shift that led to numerous protests from the various participants, right up to the festival's demise: the monarchy, officers and other churches financed ceremonies that were appropriated by the archbishops.

== Course of events ==
Positions of the boats as they sailes down the Saône.

The day, especially when it did not take place on June 2, was announced by the big bell in every church in Lyon. The streets were decorated with flowers and foliage.

The processions, each carrying professional crosses, banners and candles, set off in the following order: the Église Saint-Paul met the chapter of Saint-John, then they went together to the church of Saint-Pierre-aux-Liens in Vaise; they were finally joined by Île Barbe, Saint-Justus and Ainay. This was the supposed site of the arrest of saints Epipodus and Alexander. After a prayer, each of the five churches joined its own pre-prepared boat and set off in a precise order: Saint-Jean in the center, Saint-Just to its right and Saint-Paul to its left, Île Barbe to the far right and Ainay to the far left. The cathedral chapter was thus in first place, surrounded by the two collegiate boats, with the monasteries at either end.

While the clergy sang antiphons, prayers and psalms, the boats made their way down the Saône, pausing in front of the Saint-Epipoy church below the Château de Pierre Scize, under the "Merveilleuse" arch on the Pont du Change, and finally arriving at Ainay.

Other groups accompanied them on numerous boats, including officers of the seigniorial court, various tradesmen and inhabitants of Lyon and the surrounding villages. All in all, the flotilla, including canons, priests, seigniorial officers, bourgeois, tradesmen and peasants, probably numbered several hundred men.

The processions, still singing antiphons, went to the church of Ainay to kiss the stone of Saint Pothin (on which he is said to have slept during his imprisonment), then to Saint-Nizier church for a mass said by the local chapter.

== Protests and disappearance of the festival ==
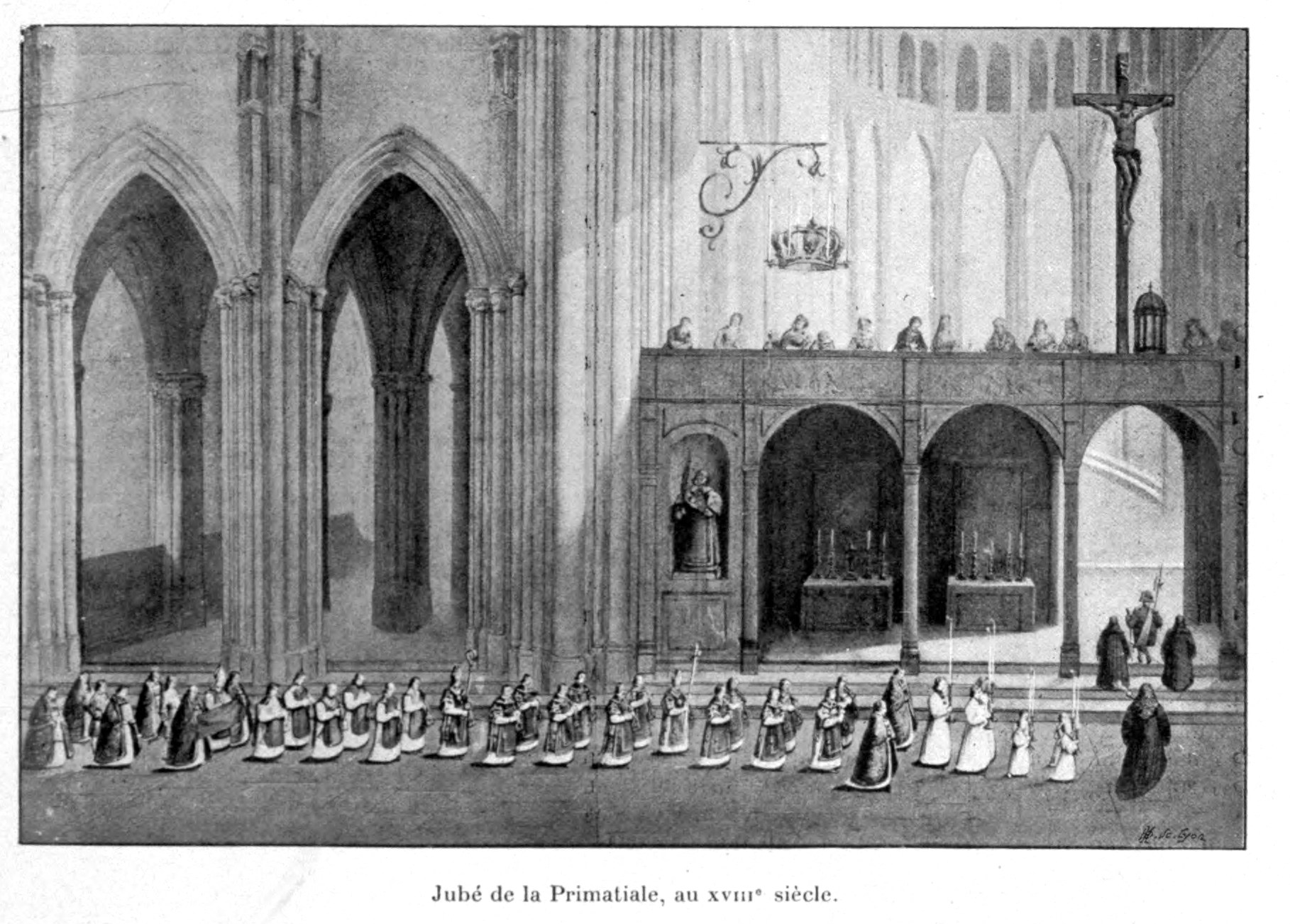
Procession in the primatial church of Saint-Jean, by Jean-Baptiste Marduel, 19th century, Archives municipales de Lyon.

From the end of the 13th century onwards, the few documents available on the Feast of Wonders revealed recurrent tensions between participants, provoked as much by the chapter as by other churches, royal officials or even citizens. For example, the canons of Saint-Just did not appear at the festival in 1285. On the orders of Archbishop Raoul de Thourotte, the judicial vicar Henri de Sartines issued a monitory against them, which was finally rescinded on October 23 of that year, when they agreed to pay a fine to the prelate if they failed to attend the next ceremony. In 1311, the Lyonnais asked Philippe le Bel, who was passing through Lyon, for "confirmation of their freedoms, immunities, customs and franchises, and the granting of new rights for the benefit of the city, the country and the public good", and for "the abolition of the August ban, levied for wine, and the Feast of Wonders, which were, they said, to the detriment of the public good". (Note: Reported by Claude-François Ménestrier in his Histoire civile ou consulaire de la ville de Lyon.) (Note: "In Lyon, we call "ban d'août", the right of the archbishop to grant permission to sell wine during the month of August. [...] It relates to the ban-vin" Denisart (1784). Veuve Desaint (ed.). Collection de décisions nouvelles et de notions relatives à la jurisprudence (in French). Vol. 3. Paris. p. 100.) This request went unanswered, but on the contrary, Peter of Savoy had the following clause inserted into the Treaty of Vienne of 1312: "We retain for ourselves and for our successors the feast called "Les Merveilles" (the wonders, in English), the right of coercion and punishment against recalcitrants and delinquents, on account of the duty they must perform on this feast, as is customary in Lyon".

In addition to political struggles, the 14th century began with severe famines, followed by the Black Death. Nevertheless, the festival continued during the Hundred Years' War, albeit in a format reduced to mass and procession, and without the participation of the surrounding villages: it was thus attested in 1362. However, on June 15, 1363, the town's councillors and trade masters (Note: magistri ministeriorum, delegates of the lord in charge of fiscal and military supervision of a sector of activity (Rossiaud 2008, p. 37)) asked the chapter to cancel the festival, citing the dangers of the enemy's presence in the diocese. As a result, the festival was exceptionally cancelled that year. (Note: Chapter Acts of Saint-John.) In 1364, it was cancelled by order of the king, as the Tard-Venus were threatening Lyon; the chapter also cancelled it in 1383.

The Lyonnais continued to call for the suppression of the Feast of Wonders. King Charles V sent a letter on August 23, 1364, in support of the clergy: "on the pleas of the citizens of Lyon, deffendit the feast of Wonders which the archbishop and the chapter of the said city had ordered and which was customarily held on the Saône by tradespeople".

On June 11, 1382, the town's inhabitants presented a new request to the chapter to use the funds allocated to the festival to repair the Rhone bridge, but the chapter refused. The festival did not take place in 1383 because of the war, and they won their case in 1384 when the king allocated all the funds earmarked for the " Feast of Wonders " for the next six years to the Rhone bridge.

In 1395, the August ban and the Feast of Wonders were at the center of a trial between the chapter and the consuls of Lyon. As a result, the ban was upheld, but the festival was abolished.

In a deed dated June 22, 1400, the chapter protested that if the celebration no longer took place, it was the citizens' fault, not its own. On June 10, 1401, the canons obtained letters from King Charles IV to the bailiff in Mâcon, forcing the canons of Saint-Just, Saint-Paul, Île Barbe and Ainay to attend the festival. These letters had no effect.

However, in June 1438, Barthélemy Berchier, canon and provost of Saint-Just and custodian of Sainte-Croix, donated one hundred ecus and three deniers for the clergy of Saint-Jean cathedral to go to Saint-Nizier processionally and officiate there "according to the ancient ritual and custom of the Feast of Miracles", wishing to allocate this sum each year until the feast was fully re-established.

Finally, on June 27, 1459, the feast of Saint Pothin was reinstated on June 2: the metropolitan chapter considered that this transfer of solemnity was no longer necessary, given that the Feast of Wonders had disappeared.

== Legends ==
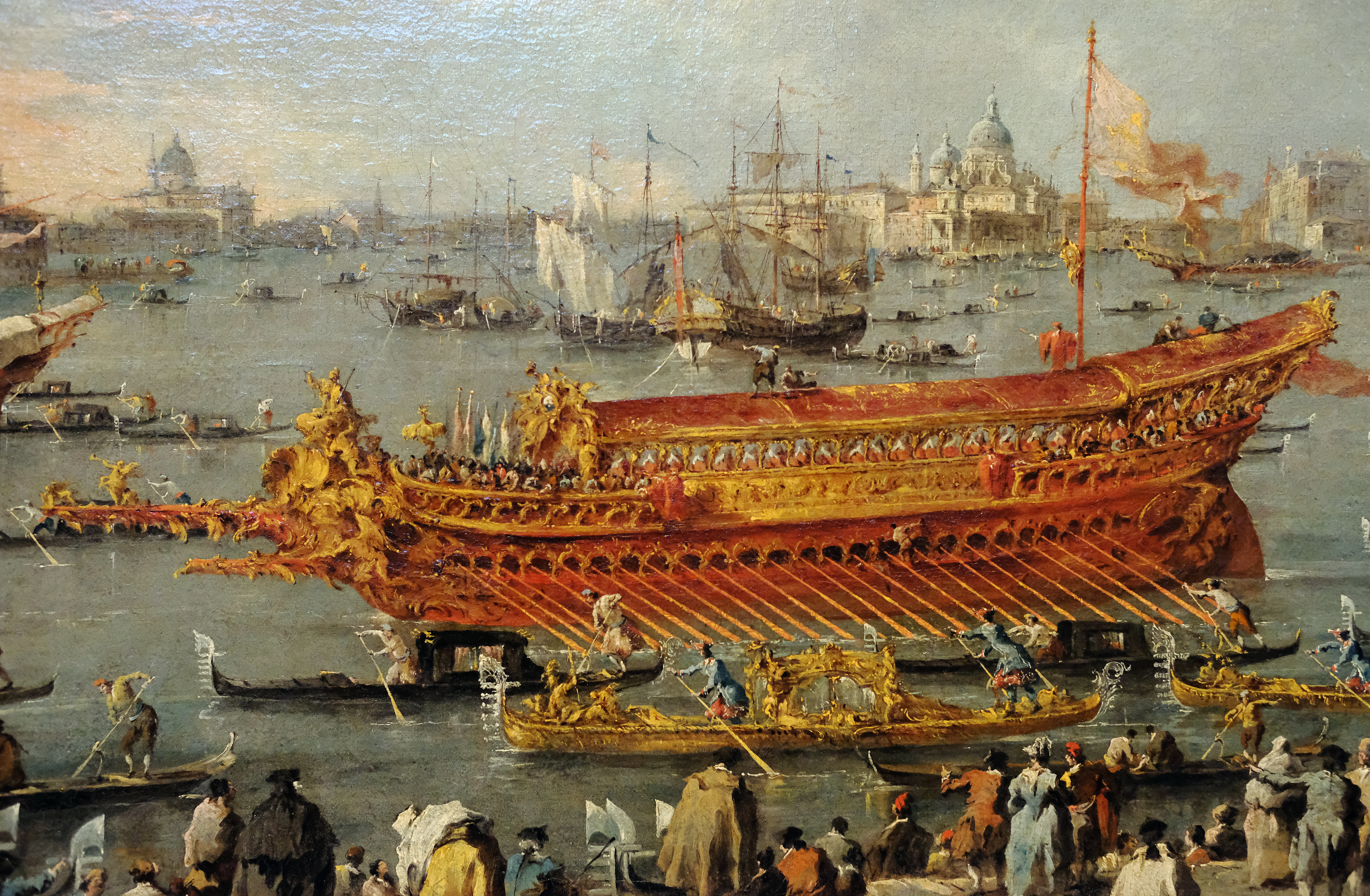
Detail of the Venetian Bucentaur.

Abbot Florent Dumas extrapolated widely, naming Saint Badulphe, the hypothetical founder of Ainay Abbey, as the creator of the Feast of Wonders. He also attributed full responsibility for organizing the celebrations to Eucherius of Lyon.

Guillaume Paradin added the main events that would capture the imagination: the participation of a boat resembling the Venetian Bucentaure, and the rushing of bulls into the Saône through a gate provided for the purpose on the Pont du Change, followed by a fight with them. (Note: "In the past," he adds, "it was a feast of great rejoicing for the people of Lyon, on which day a very large basteau, like a Bucentaur, was prepared on the Saône river, to which the city's most prominent citizens played on the water with infinite amusement. This large basteau was led under the last arch of the bridge, and for this reason it is called arcus mirabilis, i.e. the admirable arch... This arch of the bridge was named admirable or miraculous because of this feast, and near the aforementioned arch there was a door on the bridge through which bulls were made to jump into the river as a pastime". (G. Paradin in his Histoire de Lyon))

Pierre Bullioud rounded off the picture with even more far-fetched details, such as nautical combats involving the Bucentaure and the participation of people from Vienne.

None of these elements were mentioned in the documents of the time, as the meeting with the Viennese was materially impossible. The idea of bullfighting in the water came both from later French and Venetian festivals (ferrades camargaises, Tarasque, Fat Thursday in Venice), and from the presence of the Boucherie and Écorcherie d'Empire, whose animals were unloaded a few meters downstream from the Arche des Merveilles and sacrificed on rue Escorche-Bœuf, now rue Port-du-Temple.

Finally, the Venetian Bucentaure was well known from the 1500s onwards, thanks to the circulation of the printed version of Jacopo de' Barbari's Vue de Venise, and any large boat at the time took on the qualifier; Maurice Scève thus spoke of the king's vessels in one of his texts: "were the aforementioned vessels, first and foremost a Bucentaur from one of the biggest boats on the whole river".

== Historical information ==
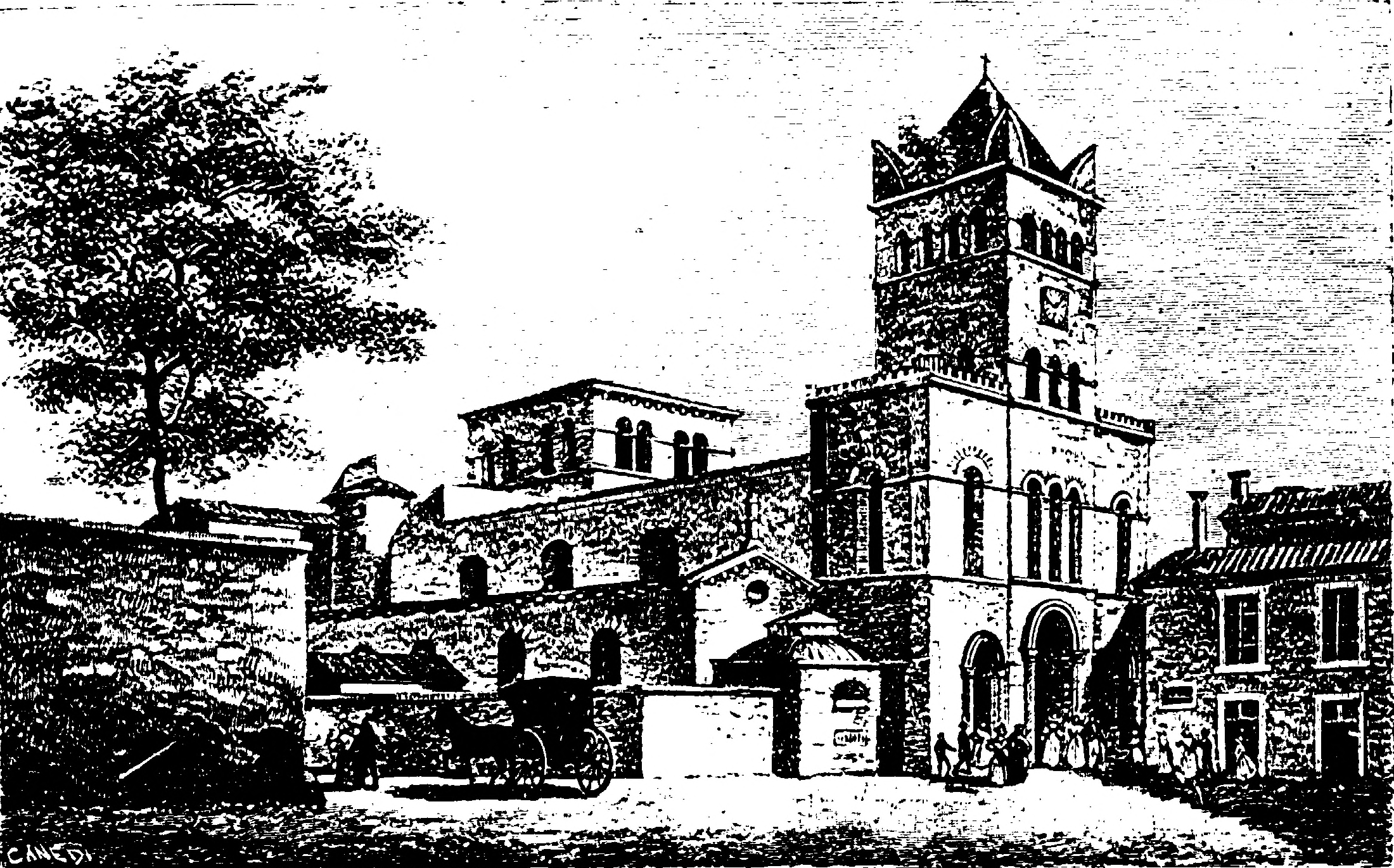
Saint-Martin d'Ainay Abbey in the late Middle Ages.

The first mention of a Lyon celebration in honor of the martyrs of 177 was made by Eucherius of Lyon in the 4th century, in a homily dedicated to saints Epipodius and Alexander. This moment was linked to a general tribute to all the martyrs of Lyon, dated June 2 and named festum miraculorum to remember the miracles attributed to the martyrs' ashes. It was Ado of Vienne, in his Martyrology (written in Lyon between 855 and 860), who gave it the name Feast of the Miracles, (Note: Martyrologium Adonis sub data IV nonas Junii) based on the writings of Gregory of Tours (in his De Gloria Martyrum) and adding a description.

As the Feast of Miracles was not mentioned in the Lyon martyrologies known to Adon, the anonymous one of 806 and that of Florus of Lyon (837), we can assume that its creation was contemporary to this period.

Several written reports from 1300 onwards enable us to reconstruct the religious part of this solemnity. The only known secular elements were the numerous armed boats that accompanied the river procession, and the probable games that followed the morning processions. A 1343 report mentions the two main armed vessels: "that of the Courrier, in charge of the archbishop's temporal justice, and that of the Prévôt executing the Courrier's orders with his sergeants". The population was content to line the streets and watch the processions.

The " Feast of Wonders " appears as an intangible custom in the Treaty of Vienne of 1312. However, the event itself, apart from the religious ceremonies, is only known by oral tradition, and was written down a hundred years after it was abolished by Claude de Bellièvre in Lugdunum Priscum. (Note: "a feastof great rejoicing for the people of Lyon... For the celebration of this feast, a large boat was taken to the Saône river, which was driven under the last arch (of the bridge) towards Saint-Nizier arcus mirabilis, and bulls were made to jump from above the bridge into the Saône, through a door which is still on the said bridge for these purposes...") This unique source was taken up by Guillaume Paradin in his Mémoires de l'Histoire de Lyon (1573), and subsequently passed on by Lyon historians. While Bellièvre based his story on vague memories of his father, Paradin added numerous details inspired by the traditions and myths of his time. It is likely, for example, that the sacrifice of bulls was added later.

Marie-Claude Guigue, chief archivist of the Rhône department and of the city of Lyon in the 19th century, gathered together all known documents on this festival and published a memoir, sorting out the true from the false. With regard to the religious ceremonial, he listed the following sources: "A very ancient ritual, of which we have only found a copy made by Abbot Sudan, but which may have been written at the time of Agobard, since the name of this archbishop was introduced later into the calendar which preceded this fragment; then the Statutes of the Church of Lyon of 1175; the Ordinaire or Livre enchaîné de Saint-Paul, which appears to belong to the first years of the 14th century; and finally the Barbet de Saint-Just, from around 1380". Despite this, imaginary facts continued to exist until the 1980s.

Jacques Rossiaud summed up the construction of legends around the feast of Wonders as follows: "When Lyon's humanists tried to reconstruct a festive history that they wanted to be uninterrupted since the city's Christian origins, the city had not had a real civic festival for at least a century and a half, and the continuity they dreamed of was, of course, nothing but an illusion".

== Feast of Wonders in Vienne ==
A similar festival was held in Vienne until 1569. The procession went to the chapel of Saint Ferréol in Saint-Romain-en-Gal, then crossed the Rhône in boats decorated with flags, ending at Saint Peter's church. This identical Viennese celebration was also known as the Feast of Wonders, and has always taken place on June 2.

This celebration of the martyrs in Vienne was recorded in two Ordinaries, one from Vienne's Saint-Maurice cathedral dating from the 13th century and the other from 1524.

== See also ==
- Feast of Fools
- Rogation days

== Bibliography ==
- Becker, Christine; Lassalle, Victor; Reynaud, Jean-François; Rubellin, Michel; Blazy, Simone (1997). L'abbaye d'Ainay: légendes et histoire (in French). Villeurbanne: Musée historique de Lyon. pp. 24–26. ISBN 2-901307-11-6.
- Galland, Bruno (1994). Deux archevêchés entre la France et l'Empire: Les archevêques de Lyon et les archevêques de Vienne du milieu du XIIème siècle au milieu du XIVème siècle (in French). Rome/Paris: École française de Rome. ISBN 2-7283-0299-5.
- Guigue, Marie-Claude (1887). Georg, Henri (ed.). Recherches sur les merveilles: Fête antique et populaire de la ville de Lyon encore célébrée à la fin du XIVème siècle (memoire) (in French). Lyon.
- Hours, Henri (1996). Histoire du pont de Saône: neuf siècles de vie lyonnaise autour du pont du Change (in French). Lyon: Jacques André. ISBN 2-907922-46-7.
- Kleinclausz, A. (1978). Histoire de Lyon: des origines à 1595 (in French). Vol. 1. Marseille: Laffitte Reprints.
- Rossiaud, Jacques (2008). "La fête des Merveilles : de l'Histoire à la légende". L'abbaye d'Ainay: des origines au XIIème siècle (in French). Saint-Just-la-Pendue: PUL. pp. 33–49. ISBN 978-2-7297-0806-1.
- Rossiaud, Jacques (2007). "merveilles, mythes et représentations". Le Rhône au Moyen Âge: histoire et représentations d'un fleuve européen (in French). Paris: Aubier. ISBN 978-2-7007-2296-3.
- Rossiaud, Jacques (2012). Lyon 1250–1550: Réalités et imaginaires d'une métropole (in French). Seyssel: Champ Vallon. ISBN 978-2-87673-597-2.
- Rossiaud, Jacques (2013). Lyon: la rivière et le fleuve (in French). Lyon: Éditions Lyonnaises d'Art et d'Histoire. pp. 40–41. ISBN 978-2-84147-313-7.
- Léger, Françoise (2010). Fête et fleuves : 7ème rendez-vous fleuve: conférence du samedi 16 janvier 2010 (DVD) (in French).
- Raynaud, Théophile (1662). Molin, Antoine (ed.). Hagiologium Lugdunense [Hagiologie lyonnaise] (in Latin). Lyon.
- Reynaud, Jean-François (January 1998). Lugdunum christianum : Lyon du Vèmme au VIIIèmme siècle: topographie, nécropoles et édifices religieux (in French). Paris: La maison des sciences de l'homme. p. 30. ISBN 2-7351-0636-5.
- Vachet, Adolphe (1895). "L'abbaye d'Ainay". In Emmanuel Vitte (ed.). Les anciens couvents de Lyon (in French). pp. 34–36.
- Vettorello, Cécile; Vignau, Marie (2010). L'eau et la santé à Lyon, la formation d'une cité: Etude historique réalisée pour l'Agence d'Urbanisme de Lyon, sous la direction de François Bregnac (in French). Lyon: Université Lumière. p. 28. Archived from the original on 2018-06-01.
- Entrées royales et fêtes populaires à Lyon du XVèmme au XVIIIèmme siècle (in French). Lyon: Bibliothèque municipale de Lyon. 1970. pp. 19–21.
- "Lyon paléochrétien" (PDF). Gadagne (in French). gadagne.musees.lyon.fr.
- Bideau, Daniel (1985). Les lieux disparus de Lyon (in French). Lyon: La Manufacture. pp. 82–83. ISBN 2-904638-27-X.

=== Works that propagate legends ===
- Bullioud, Pierre (1628). Lugdunum sacroprophanum (manuscrit) (in Latin). Vol. 2.
- Camiglieri, Laurence (1975). Nathan, Fernand (ed.). Contes et légendes du Lyonnais, de la Bresse et du Bugey (in French). pp. 189–196.
- Decitre, Monique (1995). Fêtes et chansons historiques et politiques: Lyon, Lyonnais, Beaujolais (in French). Lyon: Lugd. ISBN 2-910979-21-0.
- Duhart, Jean Michel (1998). Le Rhône légendaire et mystérieux: de Lyon à la Méditerranée (in French). Pantin: Naturellement. pp. 7–8. ISBN 2-910370-37-2.
- Dumas, Abbé Florent (1886). Les traditions d'Ainay (in French). Paris: Delhomme et Briguet.
- Fédou, René (1964). Les hommes de loi lyonnais à la fin du Moyen Âge: étude sur les origines de la classe de robe (in French). Paris: Les Belles Lettres. p. 3.
- Ferrero, Claude (2016). Tous les secrets de Lyon et de ses environs (in French). Rennes: Ouest-France. p. 79. ISBN 978-2-7373-6867-7.
- Paradin, Guillaume (1573). Gryphius, Antoine (ed.). Memoires de l'histoire de Lyon (in French). Lyon.
- Severt, Jacques (1618). Chronologia historica archiantistitum Lugdunensium [Historical chronology of the archantistitus of Lyon] (in Latin).
- Vingtrinier, Emmanuel; Coulon, Jean (1983). La Vie lyonnaise (in French). Lyon: Éditions du Lyon. pp. 371–375. ISBN 2-86821-000-7.
