= Guigue =

Guigue may refer to:

- Claude Guigue (1832–1889), French archivist
- Marie Georges Eugène Guigue (1861–1926), French historian and archivist
- Maurice Guigue (1912–2011), French football referee
- Renaud Guigue (born 1979), French professional rugby league footballer
