= Place Bellecour =

Public square in Lyon, France

Coordinates: 45°45′27″N 4°49′56″E

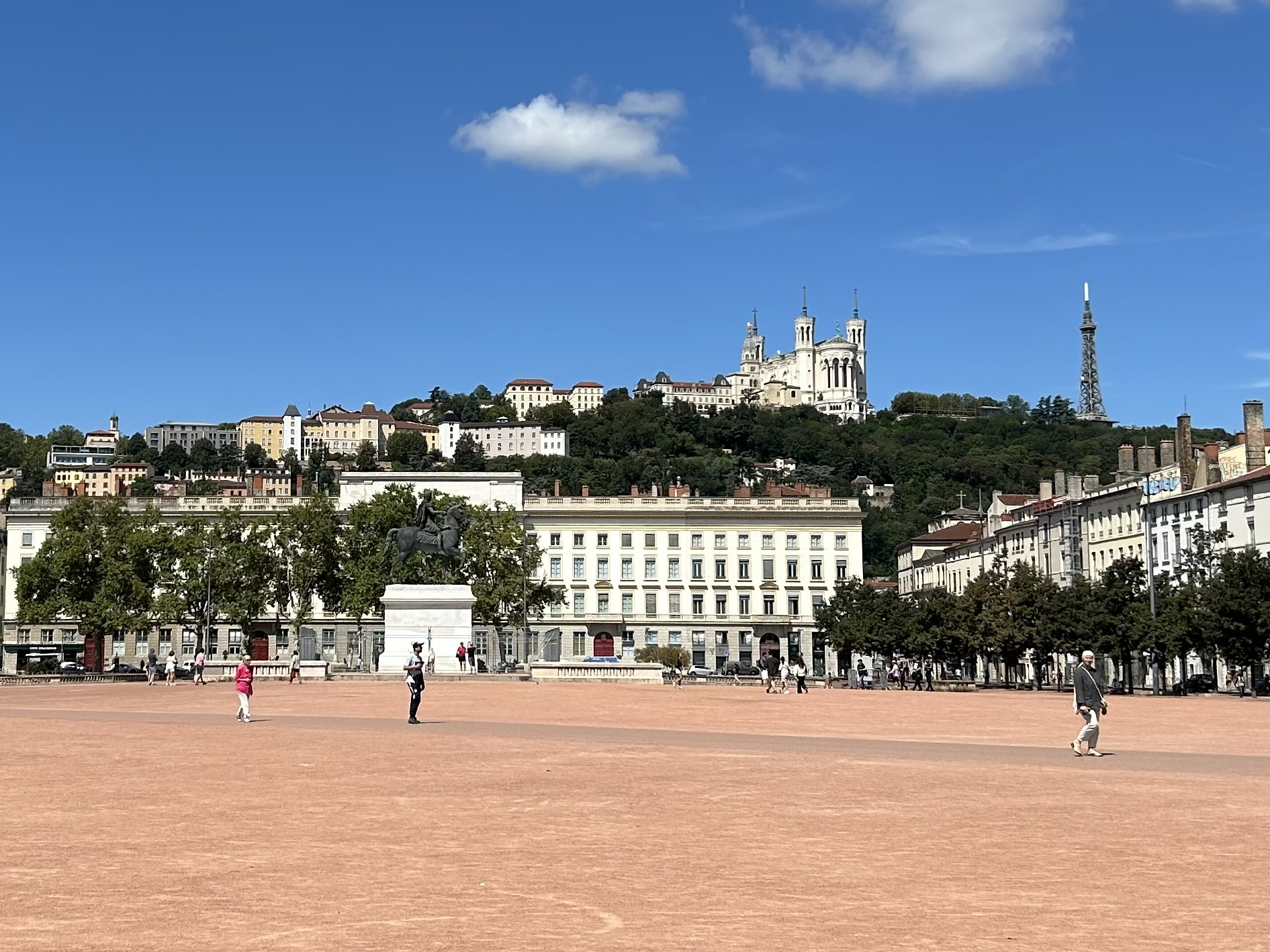
The square in 2024, with the Fourvière hill in its background.

The Place Bellecour (French pronunciation: [plas bɛlkuʁ]) is a large square in the centre of Lyon, France, to the north of the Ainay district. Measuring 312 m by 200 m (6.2 ha or 15 acres), it is one of the largest open squares (without any patches of greenery or trees) in Europe, and the third biggest square in France, behind the Place des Quinconces in Bordeaux (12.6 ha) and the Place de la Concorde in Paris (8.6 ha). It is also the largest pedestrian square in Europe: vehicles are allowed on the Place de la Concorde and Place des Quinconces.

In the middle is an equestrian statue of King Louis XIV by François-Frédéric Lemot (1825). Another statue, representing the Petit Prince and Antoine de Saint-Exupéry, is at the west end of the square. The square also has two pavilions, housing the tourist information office of Lyon and an art gallery.

The square is part of a UNESCO World Heritage Site.

== Location ==
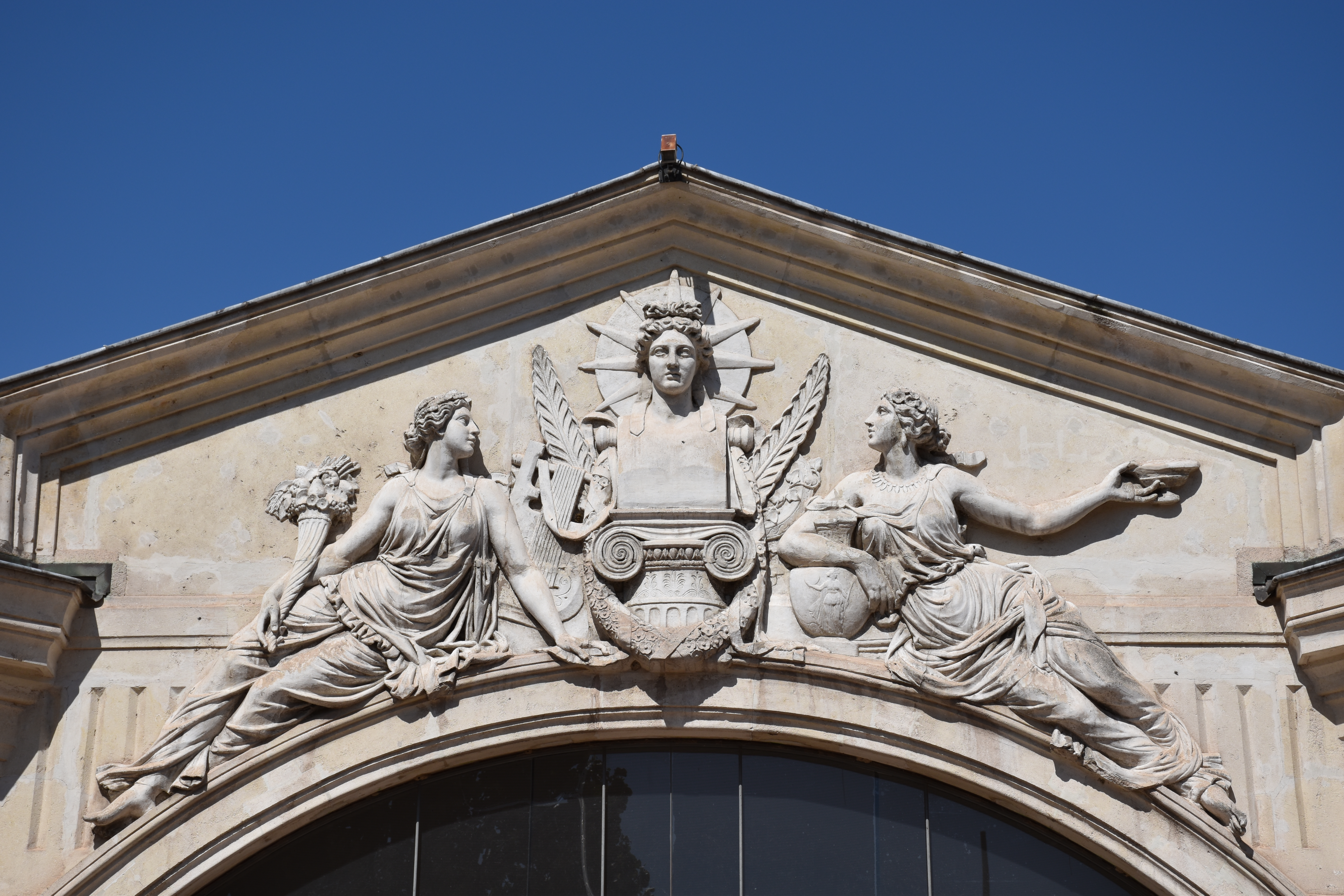
Joseph-Hugues Fabisch, Pediment with the bust of Apollo (1854), West Pavilion (current Office of the Lyon Tourist Board)

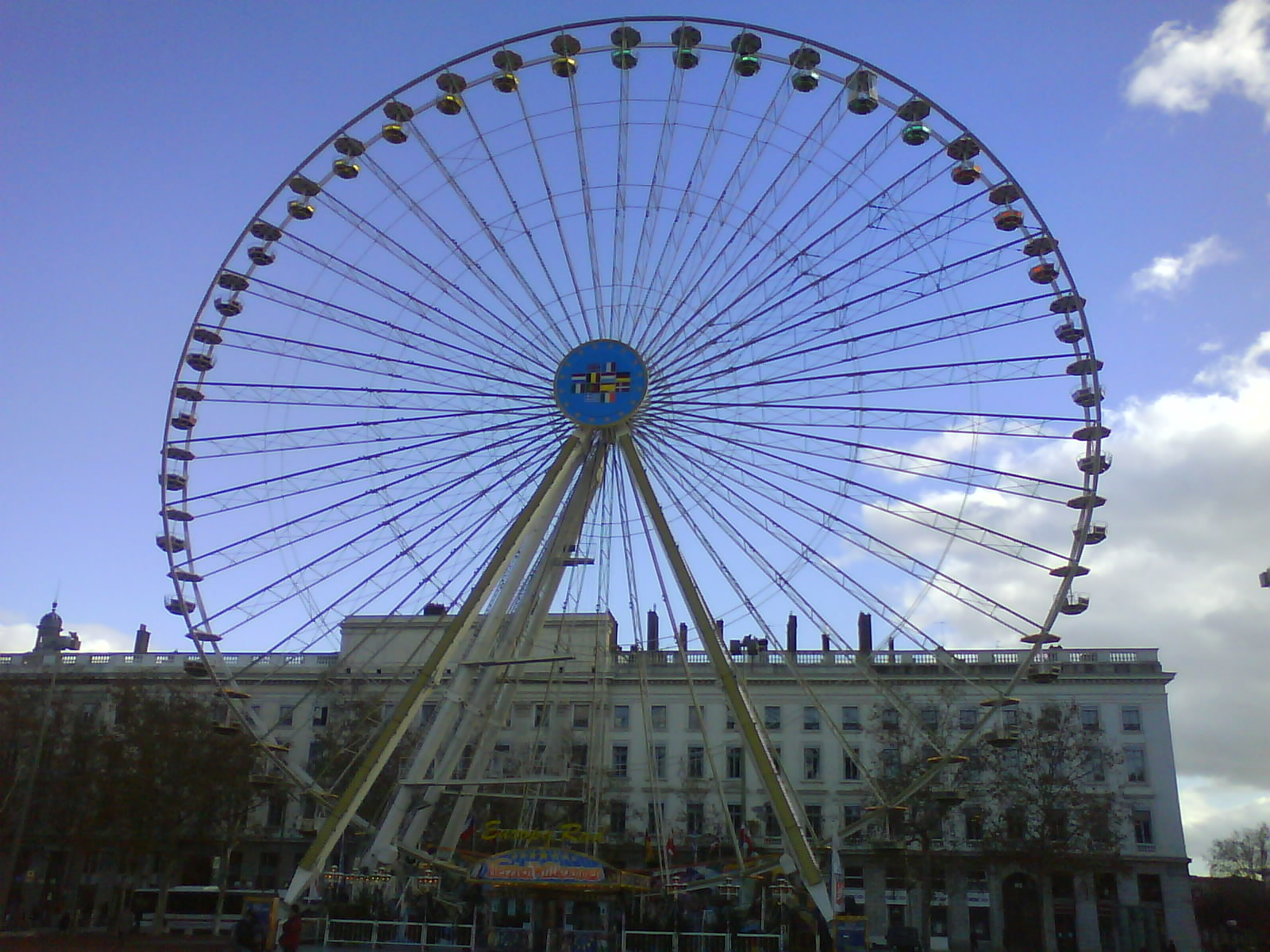
The Ferris wheel, on the Place Bellecour

This square forms the central focus of the Presqu'île (peninsula), between the Saône and the Rhône, in the 2nd arrondissement of Lyon. It hosts the Lyon tourist office and the central post office. It is a focus of the city's shopping streets: four major streets (two of them pedestrianised) start here: the Rue de la République, leading to the Hôtel de Ville and the Opéra Nouvel; the Rue Victor-Hugo and the Rue du Plat both lead to Perrache; and the Rue du Président-Édouard-Herriot, with a concentration of luxury shops and leading to the Place des Terreaux. The quarter of Vieux Lyon and the Lyon Cathedral face the square over the Saône.

The Place Bellecour is the kilometer 0 of Lyon: all distances are counted from this point.

The square's metro station, also called Bellecour, is the intersection of lines A and D. The square is also served by many buses, including 10, 14 and 88.

== History ==
During the Gallo-Roman era, the quarter of Bellecour was an alluvial island. In Roman times, the quarter had military and commercial activities: remains of huts which served as warehouses for traders and Gallo-Roman boatmen, called Canabae, have been found in this area.

In the late 12th century, the archbishop of Lyon had a vineyard there called Bella curtis (Beau jardin in French). Abandoned, the area became swampy.

In 1562, François de Beaumont, baron des Adrets attacked Lyon, installed his soldiers on the "Pré de Belle-cour".

In 1604, Henry IV forced the Lyon City Council to acquire what by then had become a pasture in order to create a public square, but the heirs of the Archbishop challenged this order in court, resulting in an interminable trial.

Many years later, in 1708, Louis XIV obtained the ownership of the square. In 1715, it became the Place Royale. Named Place Louis-le-Grand, it was adorned with a bronze statue of the king made by Martin Desjardins. Around the square, some buildings were then constructed whose façades were designed by Robert de Cotte, the first architect of Louis XIV.

During the French Revolution, an altar dedicated to Liberty was erected on the square on 14 July 1790. The square changed its name and became the Place de la Fédération. A guillotine was installed here in 1792. The royal statue was destroyed in 1793, and the square was then named Place de l'Égalité.

On 21 June 1800, Napoleon I, after his victory at Marengo, laid the foundation stone for new buildings. The square was renamed Place Bonaparte, later Place Napoléon. During the Bourbon Restoration, in 1825, a new statue of Louis XIV was erected.

It was only under the French Third Republic that the square took its current name: Place Bellecour.

== Statues ==
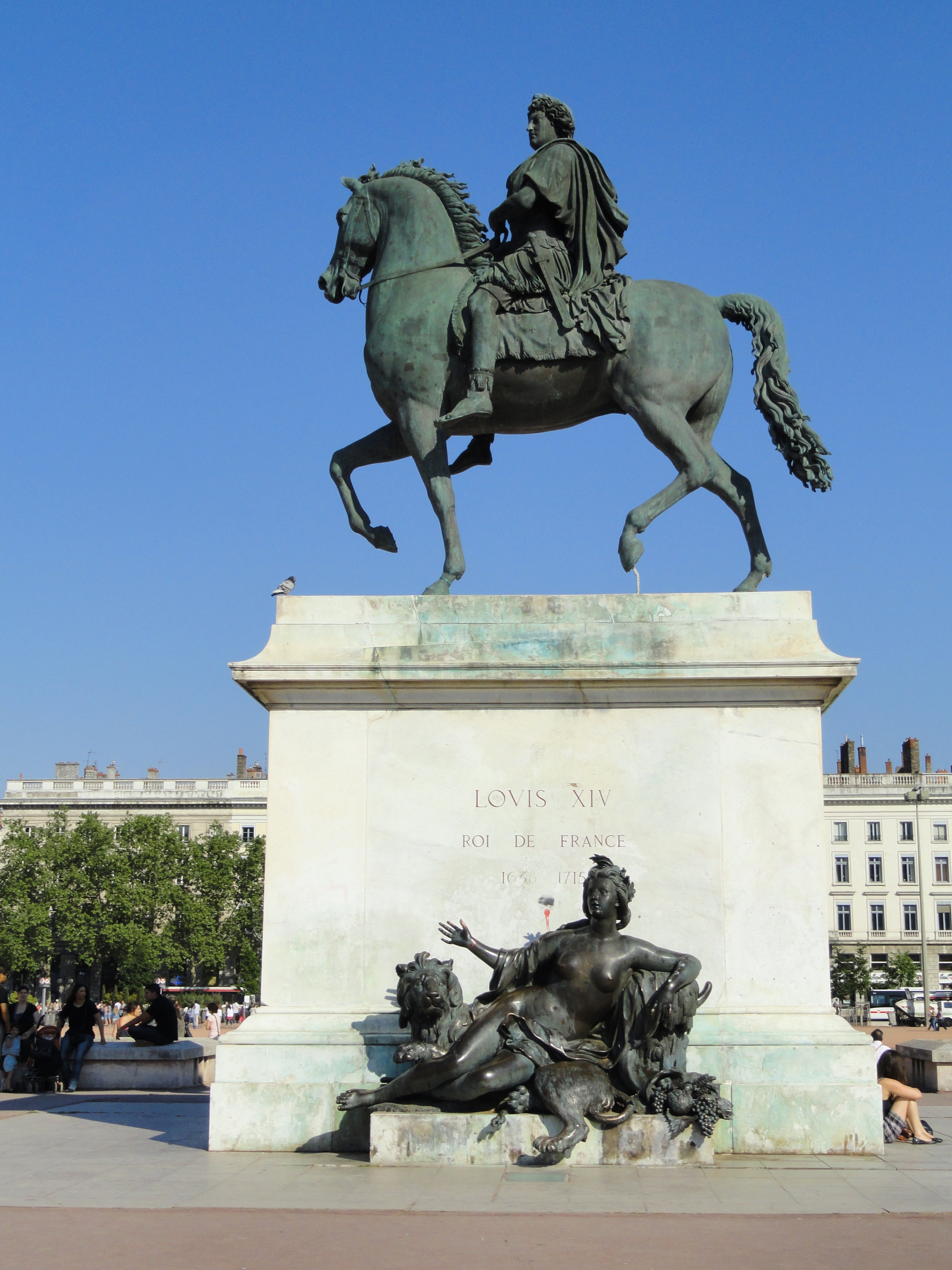
Equestrian statue of King Louis XIV, by François-Frédéric Lemot (1825)

In the center of the square, there is an equestrian statue of Louis XIV by François-Frédéric Lemot. It is accompanied, at his feet, by two allegorical statues of the Saône and the Rhône, created by the brothers Nicolas and Guillaume Costou in 1720. The base came from a village in the Beaujolais: Le Perréon.

The first statue was created in 1713 and destroyed during the French Revolution, in 1793, to make cannon. In 1825, the current statue, sculpted in Paris by François-Frédéric Lemot, was installed in the square. It was transported to Lyon in twelve days on a coupling drawn by twenty-four horses. The entrance of the statue into the city was a festive occasion that attracted a big audience.

There is also a statue of Antoine de Saint-Exupéry sitting in front of the Little Prince. It was erected in 2000 for the centenary of the aviator's birth.

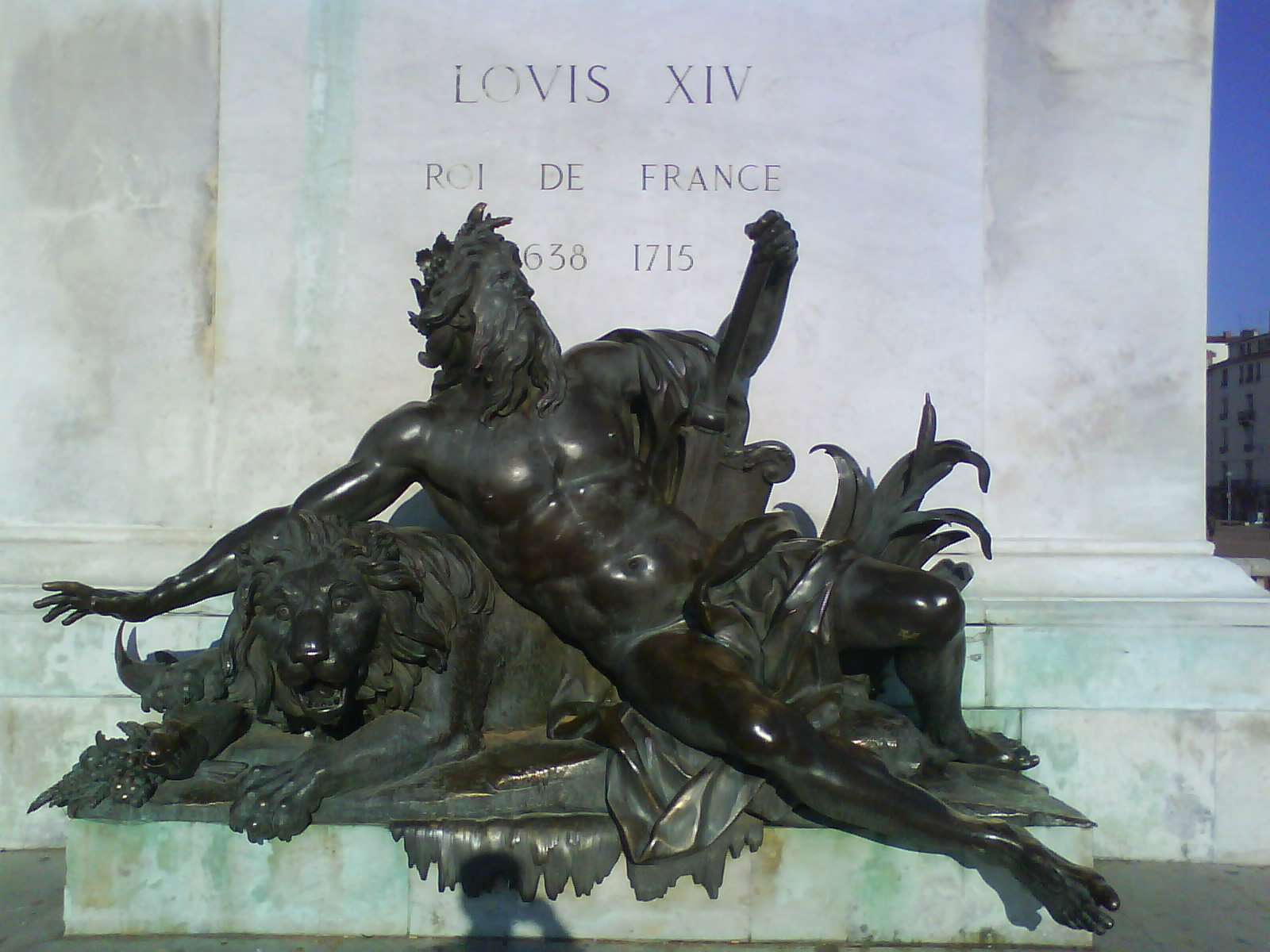
Allegorical statue of the Rhône, under the statue of Louis XIV

== Main events ==
Throughout the year, a number of events take place on the Place Bellecour:

- In winter, an ice rink is installed.
- There are sometimes concerts and events, including a book fair or a distribution of the "Petit Paumé".
- Student or trade union demonstrations often pass through.
- On the weekend of Pentecost, there is a pétanque competition.
- Every Friday night, the square is the starting point of a roller ride.
- In winter, a 60-meter Ferris wheel is installed. Previously this was on the Place Antonin Poncet, but since 2006, due to extensive works, the wheel is located nearby, on the Place Bellecour. It is dismantled in early March.

== Panorama ==
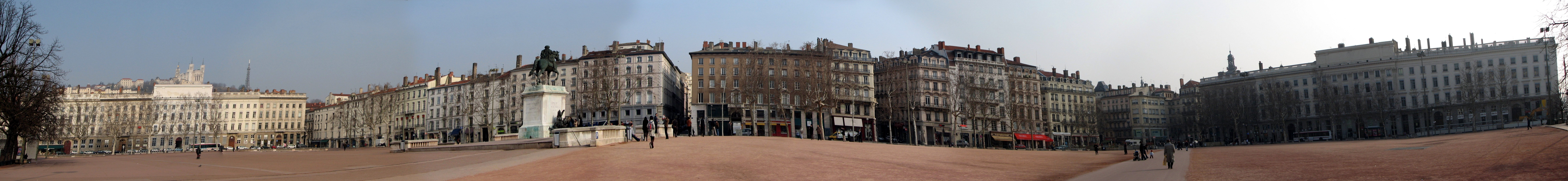
Panorama of three sides of the Place Bellecour

== See also ==
- List of streets and squares in Lyon
