= The Petit Paumé =

Le Petit Paumé
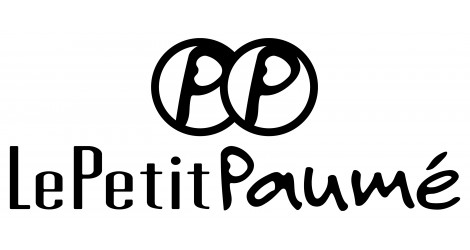
- Formation: 1968
- Headquarters: Ecully
- Official language: French
- Website: www.petitpaume.com

The Petit Paumé is a student association of EMLYON Business School created in 1968, which name comes from Jacques Brel's popular song Les Paumés du petit matin (1962).

The Petit Paumé's aim is to design and to distribute a critical and free guide of the city of Lyon. Thus, the association tests all the city restaurants, bars and shops that it wishes to mention in its annual guide.

Each of its members (about 30) is both a tester and a writer. They print about 300,000 copies of the guidebook per year.

The Petit Paumé publishes a paper version of the guide, a weekly newsletter sent by e-mail, an app for Android and iOS.

== Sections ==
Some examples of chapters in the guide are:

- "Lyon pratique" (Practical Lyon)
- "Cycle de la vie : Naissance, Étudiant, Célibataires, Mariage..." (Life cycle: Birth, Student, Singles, Wedding...)
- "Temps Libre : Activités, Offrir, Coiffeur, Beauté, Voyage..." (Free time: Activities, Gifting, Hairdresser, Beauty, Trips...)
- "Culture : Événements, Livres, Musique, Théâtre, Musée..." (Culture: Events, Books, Music, Theater, Museum...)
- "Péchés Mignons : Pâtisseries, Salons de Thé, Pain Vin Fromage, Épiceries, Traiteur" (Little weakness: Pastries, Tea house, Bread Wine Cheese, Delicatessen, Caterer)
- "Restaurants"
- "Bars"
- "Boîtes" (Nightclubs)
- "Fripon" (Naughty)

== Events ==
Events organised by the Petit Paumé include:

- The "Village du Petit Paumé" : in May or June, the Village du Petit Paumé brings together more than 25 craft producers on Place Saint-Jean during a traditional and cultural celebration. This two-day event attracts about 65,000 people.
- The "Lancement du Guide" (the Guidebook Launching): in October, the launchings in Villeurbanne, Croix-Rousse and above all on Place Bellecour gather together more than 150,000 inhabitants of Lyon. These launchings are usually accompanied by concerts, street shows, etc. designed to entertain the crowd.
- The "Nuit du Petit Paumé" (the Petit Paumé Night): organized each year at the time of the Guidebook Launching, the Petit Paumé Night is a party which notably enables several thousands of people to get a limited edition of the brand-new guidebook. One of the main issues of the party is to remind people that the guidebook is made by students.
