= Epipodius and Alexander =

Christian martyrs

Saints Epipodius and Alexander

Martyrs
- Born: Epipodius: Lyon, France; Alexander: Phrygia, Turkey
- Died: 178
- Venerated in: Roman Catholicism; Eastern Orthodoxy
- Major shrine: Lyon Cathedral
- Feast: 22 April
- Patronage: Epipodius is the patron saint of bachelors, victims of betrayal, and victims of torture.

Epipodius (French: Épipode) and his companion Alexander (died 178) are venerated as Christian saints. Their feast day is 22 April, and Alexander is additionally commemorated on April 24 in the Eastern Orthodox Church. Epipodius was a native of Lyon; Alexander was said to be a native of Phrygia, and a physician by profession. They were both martyred during the reign of Marcus Aurelius.

== Life ==
The earliest mention of Epipodius and Alexander is in a homily of St. Eucherius, about 440. Epipodius was born in Lyon and Alexander was a Greek, originally from Phrygia. Of distinguished birth, they were close friends since their childhood schooldays. Epipodius is said to have been a confirmed celibate bachelor, who devoted his time to Christian works.

In the aftermath of the Persecution in Lyon in the summer of 177, Epipodius and Alexander, having been denounced as Christians, left the city and retired to a nearby village. There they found refuge in the house of a poor Christian widow situated north-west of the hill of Fourvière. They were betrayed to imperial authorities by a servant. Both men were subsequently imprisoned, tortured, and condemned. According to Alban Butler, after enduring torture on the rack, Epipodius, the younger of the two, was beheaded. Alban Butler says that Alexander, after suffering an extended and brutal beating, was crucified and died almost immediately. Another account says that he died of the beatings and ill treatment in gaol.

== Veneration ==
The Christians privately carried off their bodies, and buried them on a hill near the city; which place became famous afterwards for the great number of miracles, which were wrought there. The tomb was originally outside the walls of the city, but later enclosed within them. St. Gregory of Tours says, that in the sixth century, their bodies, lay deposited with that of St. Irenæus, in the Church of St. John, now called St. Irenæus, under the altar, where the relics of these two holy martyrs were found 1410.

Epipodius is venerated as the patron saint of bachelors, victims of betrayal, and victims of torture.

== See also ==
- Persecution in Lyon
