= Rue Victor-Hugo, Lyon =

Pedestrian street in the 2nd arrondissement of Lyon, France

Coordinates: 45°45′15″N 4°49′48″E

Rue Victor-Hugo
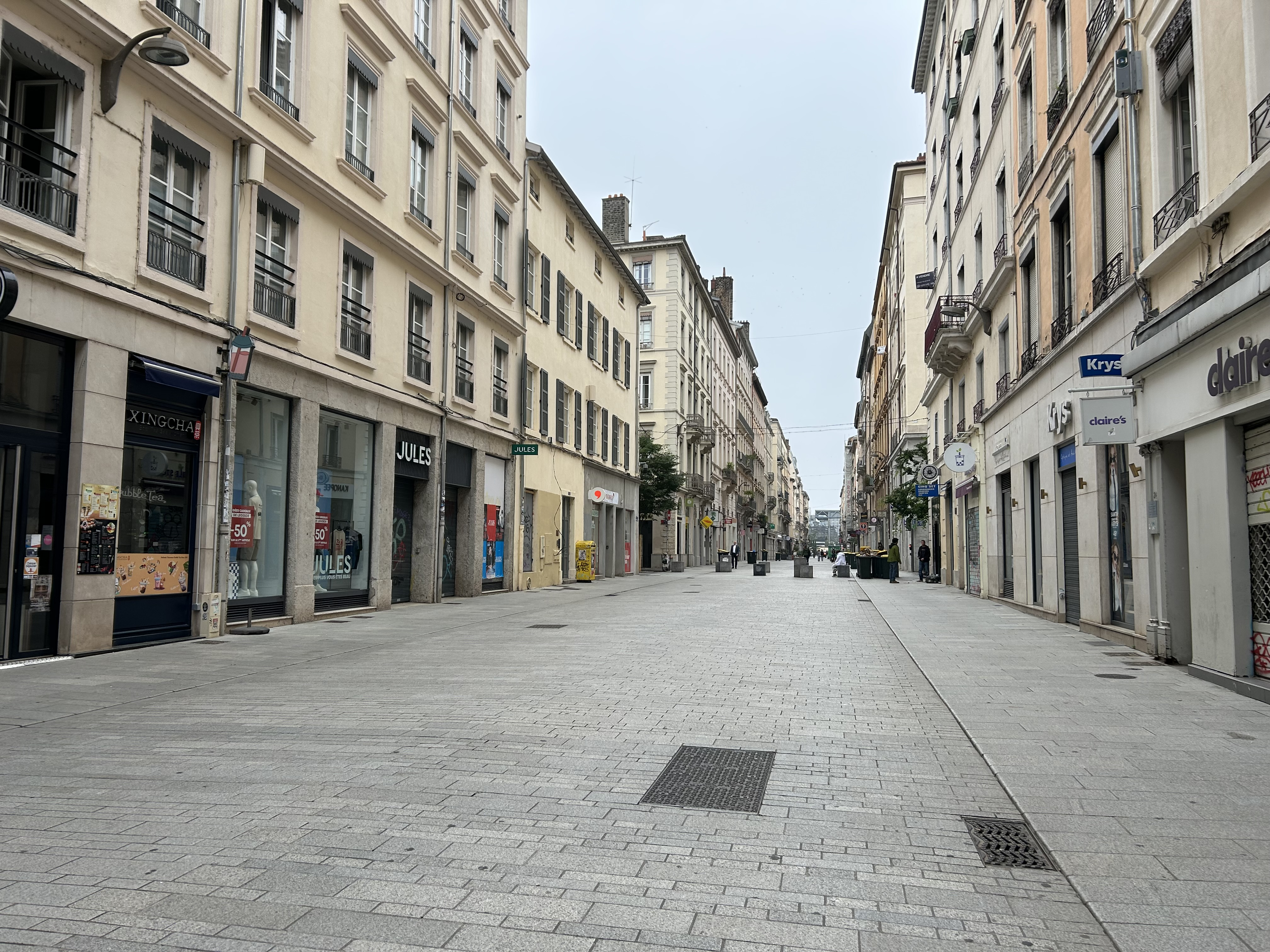
- The street in 2025.
- Former name(s): Rue de la Direction; Grande rue Royale; Rue Bourbon (1816-1848); Rue de la République (1848-1852); Rue Bourbon (1852-1885)
- Type: Street
- Location: 2nd arrondissement of Lyon, Lyon, France
- Postal code: 69002

Construction
- Construction start: First Empire
- Completion: 1842

The Rue Victor-Hugo (French pronunciation: [ʁy viktɔʁ yɡo]) is a pedestrian street in the 2nd arrondissement of Lyon, in the Ainay district of the Presqu'île quarter, reputed to be one of the most known shopping area of Lyon. From north to south, it connects the Place Bellecour to the Place Carnot. Beyond the Place Bellecour, the Rue de la République is its natural extension, thus creating one of the biggest pedestrian streets in Europe. The street is served by metro stations Perrache, Bellecour and Ampère - Victor Hugo. It belongs to the zone classified as World Heritage Site by UNESCO.

== Description ==
There are mainly cafeterias, restaurants, shops, services and hotels. In its center, it includes a pedestrian square with trees, the Place Ampère which gave, with the street itself, the name of the metro station it serves, Ampère - Victor Hugo.

The street is mostly surrounded by three to six-floor buildings of the 19th century. There are two older houses on corners of the Rue Sainte-Hélène and the Rue Jarente. Most doors have beautiful sculptures and decorations (heads of lions, snakes ...).

== History ==
The street should have been named Rue d'Euripide and Rue du Caire, but these names were ultimately never used. It was first named Rue de la Direction, then Grande Rue Royale, and was named Rue de Bourbon in September 1816 as tribute to Lyon alderman Jacques Bourbon. Planned in 1775 by Perrache and drawn during the First Empire, it would allow the emperor to see the equestrian statue of Louis XIV located on the Place Bellecour from his palace whose construction was scheduled at the Confluence. The street met the Place Bellecour in 1841 and the digging of the road was eventually completed in 1842. Since its inception, it sheltered aristocracy of Lyon. The street was renamed Rue de la République from 1848 to 1852 before retook its original name. Its current name was assigned by the deliberation of the municipal council on 26 May 1885.

The street was opened in five steps: first in 1817 from the Place Napoléon to the Rue des Ramparts d'Ainay, then in 1920 from the Rue Sainte-Hélène to the Rue Sala, then in 1832 from the Rue Jarente to the Rue Sainte-Hélène, then in 1839 on the garden of the Hotel, and finally in 1841 from the Hotel to the Place Bellecour. The odd numbers 1 to 27 were built between 1834 and 1848, numbers 29 to 67 between 1820 and 1857, and the even numbers from 2 to 16 in 1844 and numbers 18 to 68 between 1826 and 1864. At No. 25 and 27, an institution founded by Chalotte Dupin and called the Œuvre des Charlottes was installed, which became the Sisters of St. Joseph.

In 1974, the street was ripped to the needs of the construction of the Line A of the metro. On 8 December 1976, after a two-year work and despite the traders' opposition and the mayor's lack of enthusiasm, it was transformed into a pedestrian street and took its current shape, which made it the second pedestrian street of Lyon and France (the first one was the Rue de la République, a few months earlier).

On 27 March 1984, gendarmer general Guy Delfosse was killed in a bank attack by the terrorist group Action directe.
