= Lyon astronomical clock =

Astronomical clock in the cathedral of Lyon, France

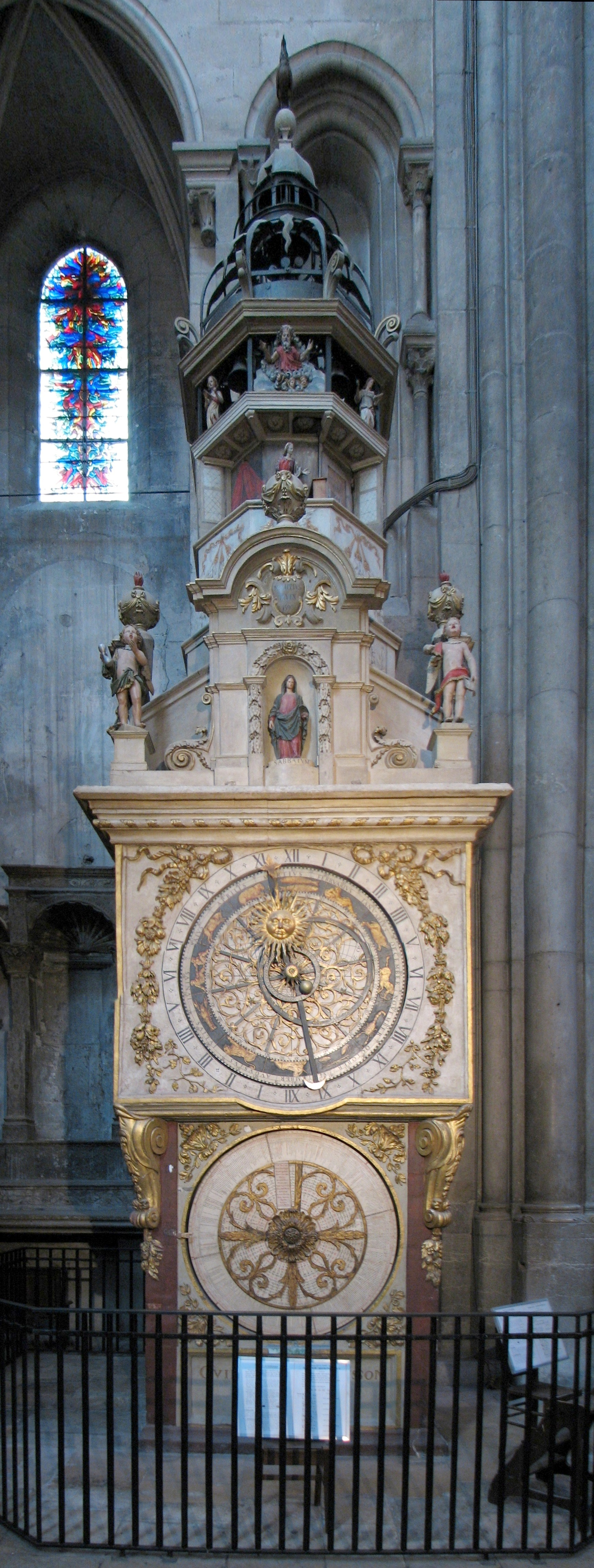
Lyon Astronomical clock

Video of the cathedral's astronomical clock

The Lyon astronomical clock (French: Horloge astronomique de Lyon) is a seventeenth-century astronomical clock in Lyon Cathedral.

== History and description ==
The 9 m (30 ft) tall clock is installed in the cathedral of Lyon. An astrolabe indicates the date and position of the Moon, Sun, and Earth, as well as the stars. The first documentary evidence of an astronomical clock in the cathedral is from 1383 but this was destroyed in 1562. In 1661 it was reconstructed by Guillaume Nourrisson. During the French Revolution, all royal insignia was removed. The last restoration in 1954 reset the clock's perpetual calendar of 66 years. It will be accurate until 2019.

The central tower octagon supports several automated figures. After the angel on the left turns the hourglass, an angel on the right keeps the time for the three angels who strike bells to sound the hymn of Saint Jean-Baptiste. The Virgin Mary kneels in a chapel, and turns to the Angel Gabriel as he opens the chapel door, while a dove descends, representing the Holy Spirit. A Swiss Guard rotates around the dome. Movement stops at the sounding of the hour.

In a western niche, a statue rotates at midnight. On Sunday, it is Jesus resurrected; Monday: his death; Tuesday: St. John the Baptist; Wednesday: St. Stephen (patron saint of the ancient basilica) holding the palm of martyrs; Thursday: a child with chalice and host; Friday: a child with the symbols of crucifixion; on Saturday: the Virgin Mary.

The clock was vandalized by an Iranian man in 2013, who claimed that "the magnificence of the clock prevented the faithful from concentrating on prayer." It is currently being repaired and is scheduled to begin operation again some time in 2024.
