= Marie Georges Eugène Guigue =

Marie Georges Eugène Guigue (8 November 1861 in Trévoux – 27 September 1926 in Lyon) was a French historian and archivist.

Georges was the son of Marie-Claude Guigue, archivist and historian of Rhône. He followed the same path as his father and attended the École Nationale des Chartes, where he graduated as an archiviste paléographe with the thesis on Les Tard-Venus en Lyonnais, Forez et Beaujolais (1356 - 1369), published in 1886.

In 1883 he was appointed archivist in Lyon and in 1889, on the death of his father, he became archivist-in-chief of Rhône. He innovated the archives by photographing the documents of former background and making these images available. Thanks to the archives, he wrote many papers on the history of Lyon. 1889 - Inspector-General of Commons of Rhône. 1905 - Member of the Academy of literature science and arts de Lyon.

In 1926, retired from the archives, he was appointed curator of the Museum of Old Lyon, located in the hotel Gadagne, but died in April.

He was also president of the Anthropological Society of Lyon. In his introduction to the book of friendship dedicated to Jehan de Paris by Pierre Sala Esquire published in 1884, he is the author of the first biography of Pierre Sala consistently, through its research in lyonnaises archives.
