= Ainay =

Human settlement in France

Coordinates: 45°45′11″N 4°49′43″E

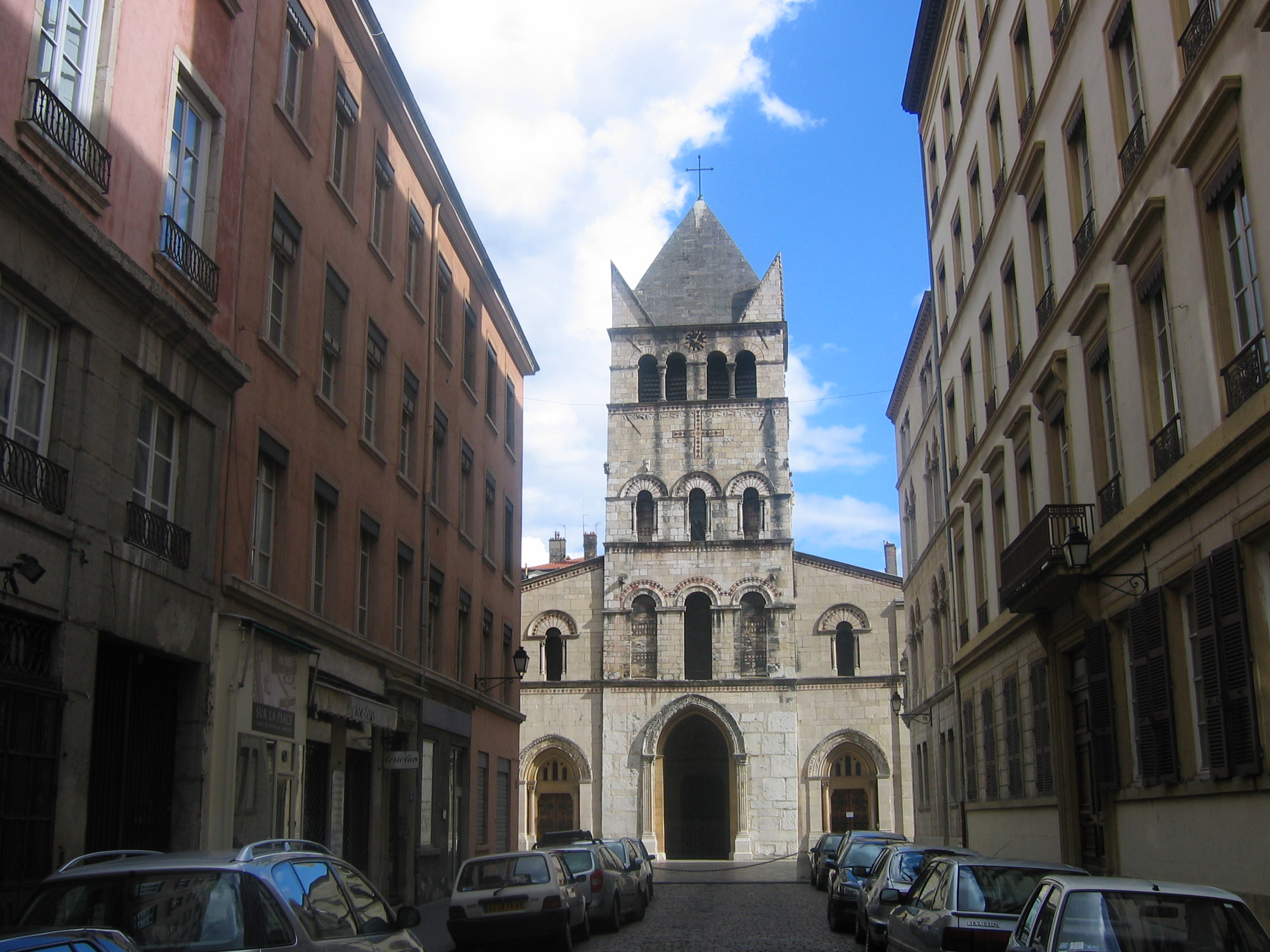
Saint-Martin d'Ainay

Ainay French pronunciation: [ɛnɛ] is an area within the Presqu'ile district in the 2nd arrondissement of Lyon, to the south of Place Bellecour and the north of Perrache. It is best known for its Romanesque church, the Basilica of Saint-Martin d'Ainay. A high-class area, bourgeoise, in the city centre, its buildings mainly date to the Bourbon Restoration era. It now houses the 2nd arrondissement's town-hall, as well as many shops along its pedestrianised main street, Rue Victor-Hugo. It is served by the Metro station Ampère - Victor Hugo.

Several hypotheses have been raised as to its name, which may be linked to Athanase (Athanasius) or, more doubtfully, to Athena.

== History ==
The present basilica of Saint-Martin d'Ainay was previously the monastic church of Ainay Abbey. A rampart was built between 1313 and 1324 to protect the abbey's lands at the request of abbot Jean II de la Palud. The ramparts were strengthened in 1544, but this did not stop the Huguenots from devastating the abbey's archives, church and part of its cloister and the ramparts were later destroyed after 1777 to link the area with a new district built on land reclaimed from the river.

Palud also built an abbatial palace which hosted several kings of France during the 16th century, when the French royal court was still itinerant rather than having a permanent base in Versailles or Paris. In 1536 the court set up home in Lyon, whilst Francis I of France was gathering his troops to the south-east of Avignon to face Charles V's invasion of Provence. On 2 August that year the dauphin Francis played at a jeu de paume court "pré[s] d'Ainay" and, getting overheated, drank a glass of iced water which proved fatal (he died a few days later at Tournon-sur-Rhône, aged 18). This event may have dissuaded Francis I from making Lyon his capital despite it being en route to his Italian Wars, though a street in the district is named rue François Dauphin after him. The abbots' palace was destroyed during the French Revolution.

In 1745 the pont d'Ainay was built to link Ainay with the Saint-Georges district on the Saône's right bank. In the years after 1777 the area expanded and in 1780 the bridge was still located at the confluence of the Rhône and the Saône. A road running south along the route of the old ramparts was named rue des Remparts d'Ainay. Close by is also to be found the "voute d'Ainay", on the site of an old gate into the abbey precinct. An aristocratic district in the 18th century, it shifted to "grande bourgeoisie" residences in the 19th century.
