= Basilica of Saint-Martin d'Ainay =

Church in Ainay, France

Coordinates: 45.753712°N 4.827239°E

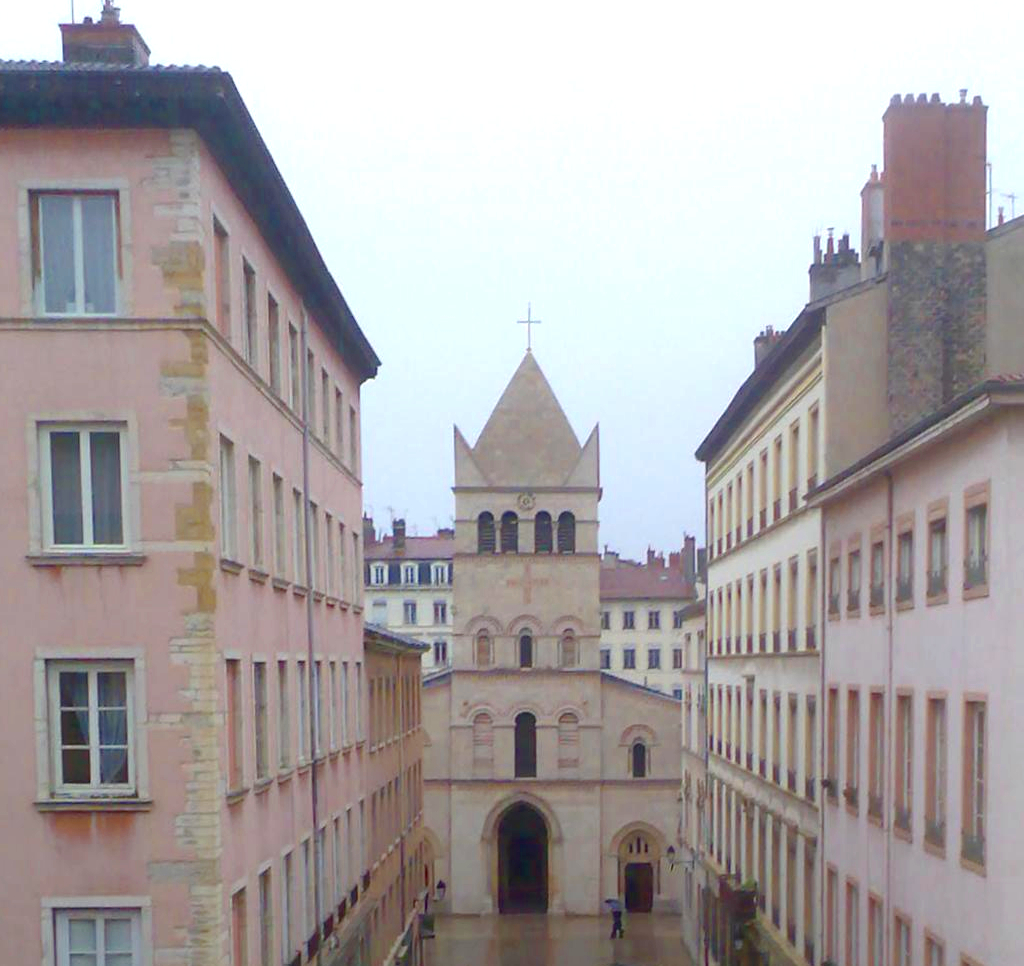
The basilica as seen from the Ainay vault

The Basilica of Saint-Martin d'Ainay (French: Basilique Saint-Martin d'Ainay) is a Romanesque church in Ainay in the Presqu'île district in the historic centre of Lyon, France. A quintessential example of Romanesque architecture, it was inscribed on the UNESCO World Heritage List along with other notable buildings in the centre of Lyon as a testimony to Lyon's long history as an important European town and unique blend of architectural styles.

== History ==
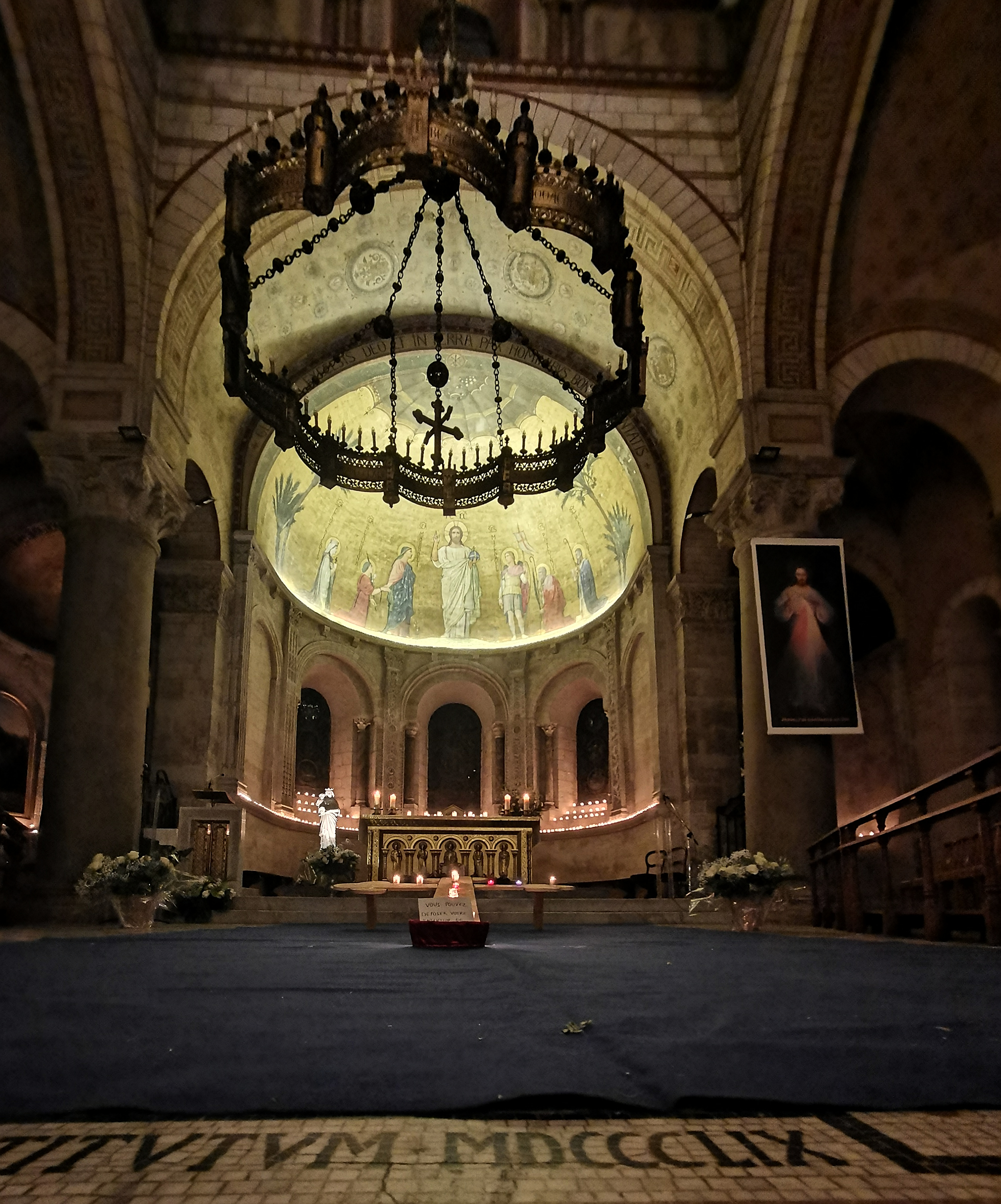
view of the central apse (painted by Hippolyte Flandrin)

=== Legend ===
Legendary origins of a remarkably large church, which may once have stood on this site, are noted by Gregory of Tours and may be connected to the account of Eusebius, in his Historia Ecclesiae, of the martyrdom of Blandina, the young girl among 48 Christians fed to lions by the Romans in 177 in Lyon's amphitheatre. The lions refused to eat her, according to Eusebius: she and the others were martyred nevertheless. Their bones were burnt, thrown into the river, and washed up downstream where the surviving Christians of the community buried them secretly beneath the altar of what Gregory calls a "basilica of remarkable magnitude." Other candidates for the martyrs' basilica site include the Church of Saint Nizier, upstream, and Lyon Cathedral across the Saône.

=== Ainay Abbey ===
A Benedictine priory was founded on the Lyon peninsula in 859. When later it was raised to the rank of an abbey, major building works began: the abbey church was built at the end of the 11th century under Abbot Gaucerand, consecrated on 29 January 1107 and dedicated to Saint Martin of Tours by Pope Pascal II. This church is today one of the Romanesque churches still extant in Lyon.

The tiny building with its massive walls, watchtower, narrow window openings and spaces for heavy doors, was apparently built with defence in mind, and reflects the many dangers of warfare and violent incursions of the period of its construction.

In 1245 at the First Council of Lyon Ainay Abbey was acknowledged to have precedence over 71 churches, abbeys and priories from Burgundy to Provence, and was thus one of the most powerful religious houses in the region.

During the Renaissance the monastery owned a port, the abbot lived in a palace and the monks had the use of substantial buildings, cloisters, a garden and a vineyard. Little by little, the life of the community ceased to be a monastic one, particularly once the abbots became commendatory and were nominated by the king. The abbey's temporal power continued, but its spiritual life evaporated.

In 1562, during the French Wars of Religion, the troops of the Baron des Adrets destroyed part of the buildings, including the cloister; the church was badly damaged. In 1600, King Henry IV of France stayed at the abbey on the occasion of his marriage to Marie de' Medici which took place in Lyon Cathedral.

=== Secular community, parish church and basilica ===
By the end of the 17th century the monastic community had ceased to exist. The church and remaining buildings were handed over to a secular chapter in 1685. The church became a parish church, and on 27 January 1780, ceased to have the title of abbey.

Louis XIII stayed there with his minister Richelieu, and Louis XIV stayed there four times.

During the French Revolution the premises were confiscated and nationalised, and the abbots' palace destroyed. The church became a grain store, which saved it from being likewise destroyed.

The church was returned to parish use in 1802. It was classed as a monument historique in 1844, and during the course of the 19th century was restored in a Romanesque Revival style by the architects Pollet and Benoôt in a "pure Romanesque" spirit, destroying the last remains of the cloister and enlarging it by the addition of side chapels.

The church was raised to the rank of basilica by Pope Pius X on 13 June 1905.

== Architecture ==
The basilica at Ainay contains several architectural styles: the chapel of Saint Blandina is pre-Romanesque; the principal structure is Romanesque; the chapel of Saint Michael is Gothic; and the overall restoration and enlargement of the 19th century is Romanesque Revival.

Nevertheless, despite its eventful history, the church retains a genuine unity of style.

The nave measures 17 metres in width, and the whole structure is 37 metres in length.

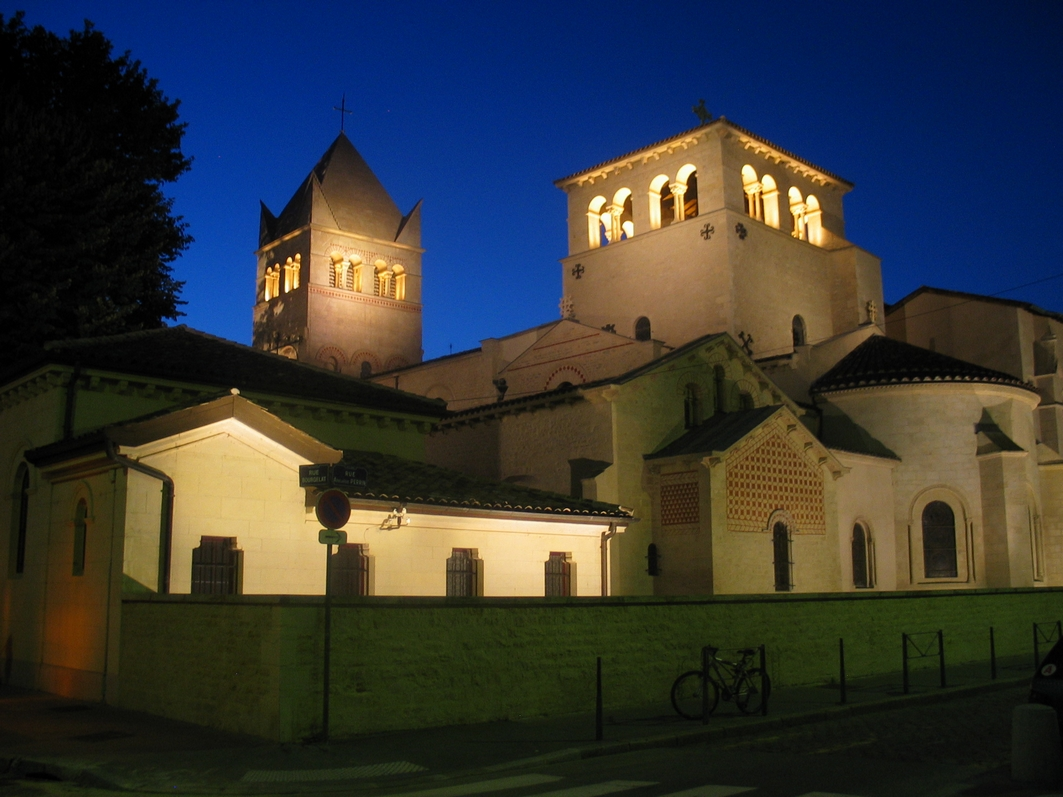
View of the Abbey

== Burials ==
The basilica of Saint-Martin is the burial place of Bishop John O'Brien of Cloyne and Ross in Ireland, the noted Irish lexicographer and antiquarian, who died in Lyon on 13 March 1769.

== See also ==
- High medieval domes

== Sources and bibliography ==
- Lyon, basilique Saint-Martin d'Ainay (in French)
- Photos of the Basilica of Saint-Martin d'Ainay (in French)

Bibliography

- L'abbaye d'Ainay: légendes et histoire: [exposition], Musée historique de Lyon, Hôtel de Gadagne, octobre 1997-février 1998. Lyon: Musée historique de Lyon, 1997 ISBN 2-901307-11-6
- Bernard, Aug. (ed.), 1853: Cartulaire de l'Abbaye de Savigny. Suivi du Petit cartulaire de l'Abbaye d'Ainay, (Collection de documents inédits sur l'histoire de France. Première série, Histoire politique.) 2 vols. Paris: Imprimerie impériale
- Reynaud, Jean-François, 1997: L'âme romane de Lyon, with photographs by Pierre Aubert ([Lyon] (BP 1192, 69203 Cedex 01): Groupe Esprit public, 1997) ISBN 2-9510078-2-5
