= Place Saint-Jean =

Pedestrian square in Lyon, France

Coordinates: 45°45′40″N 4°49′35″E

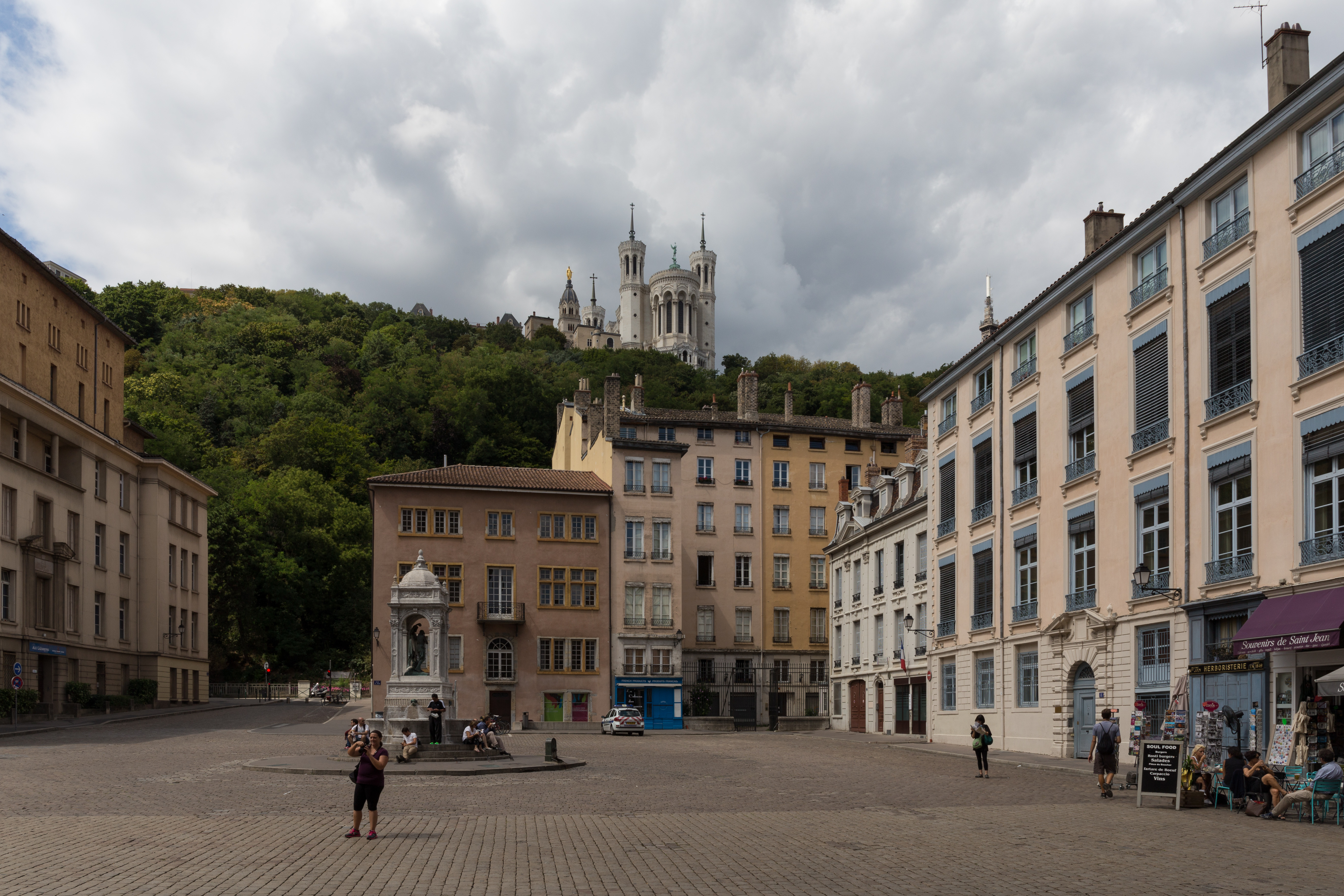
Place Saint-Jean

The Place Saint-Jean is an old pedestrian square in the 5th arrondissement of Lyon (a.k.a. the "vieux Lyon", which means the oldest borough of Lyon). It is located in front of the Roman Catholic cathedral of Saint-Jean.

The square belongs to the zone classified as World Heritage Site by UNESCO.

== Metro Station ==
The Place Saint-Jean is located near the metro station: Vieux-Lyon – Cathédrale Saint-Jean. It is served by line D.
