= Claude Guigue =

French archivist

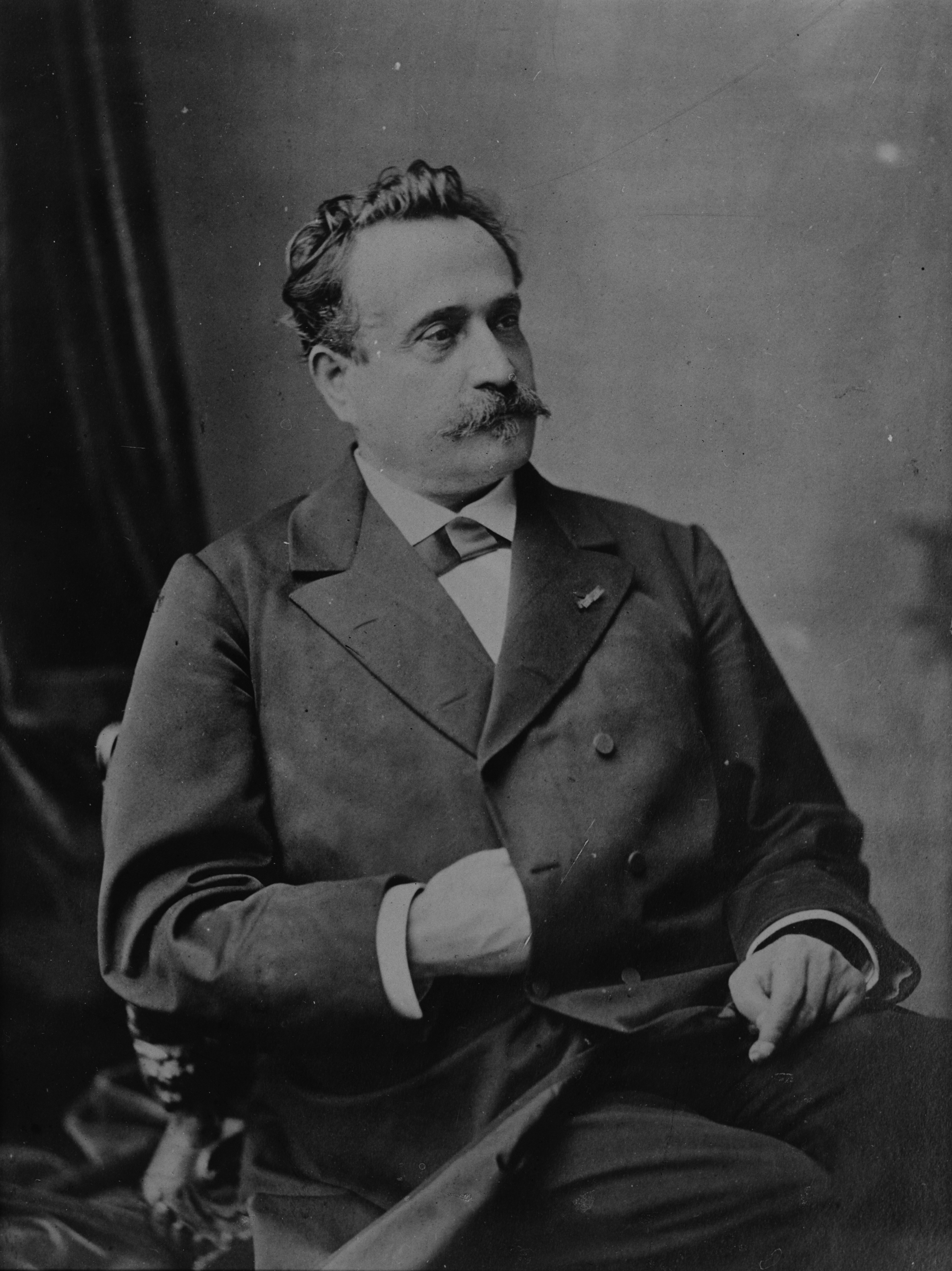
Marie-Claude Guigue

Marie-Claude Guigue (16 October 1832, Trévoux – 8 February 1889, Trévoux) was a French archivist.

He gained a Bachelor of Letters in 1852, and a licence in law in 1855. He attended the École Nationale des Chartes, where he graduated as an archiviste paléographe with the thesis Essai sur les causes de la dépopulation de la Dombes et l'origine des étangs ("Essay on the causes of the depopulation of the Dombes and origin of the Étangs"; 1857). He was also the translator of secret notes of Napoleon I to Napoleon III.

In 1873 he published Topographie historique du département de l'Ain ("Historical topography of the department of Ain").

== Timeline ==
- 1859 – Auditor of Weights and Measures in Trévoux.
- 1866 – Collector in Songieu.
- 1870 – Collector in Vonnas.
- 1873 – County archivist of Ain.
- 1874 – Assistant archivist of Lyon.
- 1877–1889 – Librarian-in-Chief of the departmental archives of the Rhône and Lyon.
- 1877 – Member of the Académie des sciences, belles-lettres et arts de Lyon.
- 1880 – Inspector-General of the municipal archives department.
- His son Georges continued his work and his passion for history.
