= Lyon Cathedral =

Roman Catholic church in Lyon

Lyon Cathedral Cathedral of Saint John the Baptist of Lyon
- French: Cathédrale Saint-Jean-Baptiste de Lyon
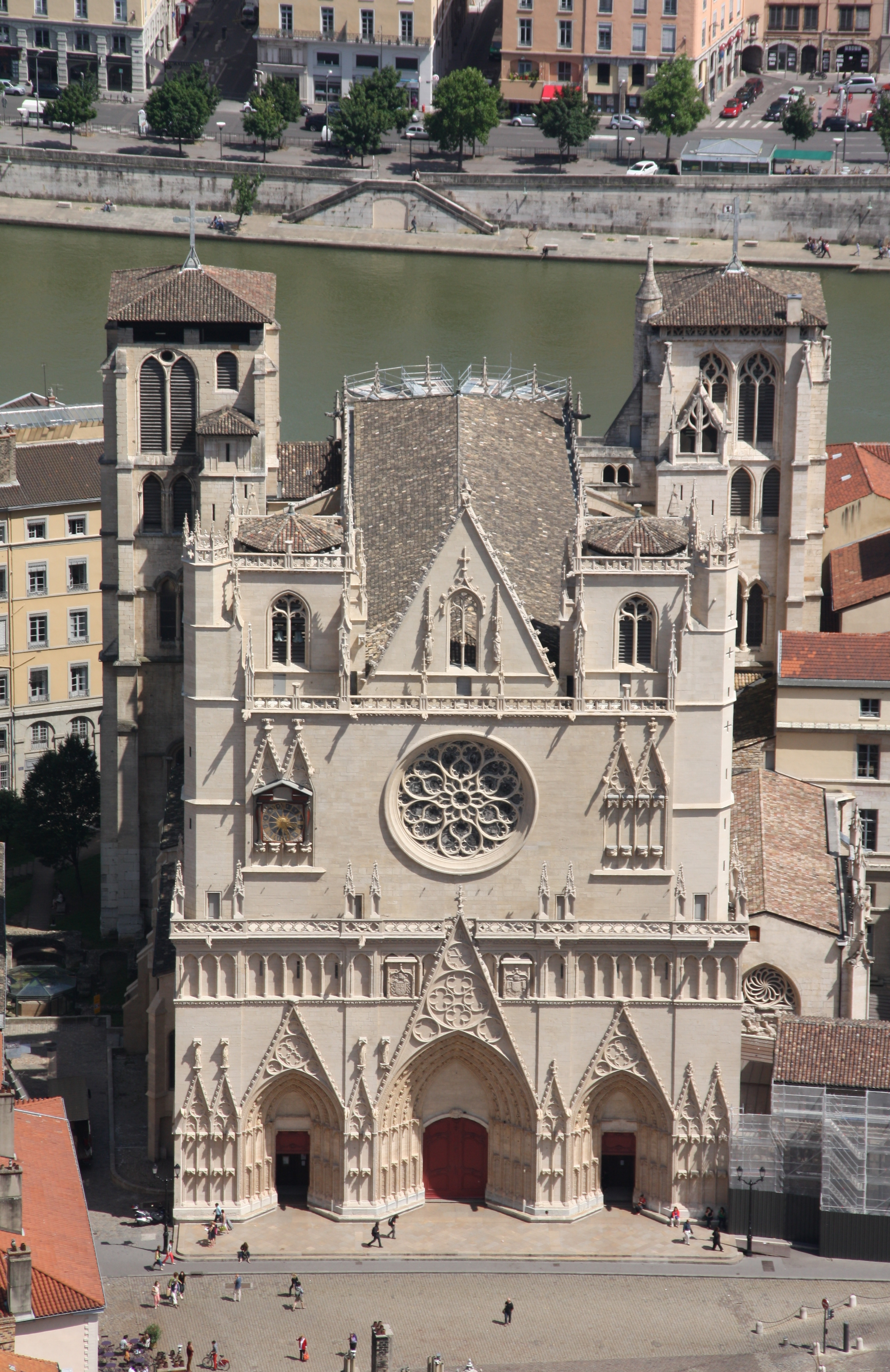
- Lyon Cathedral

Religion
- Affiliation: Catholic Church
- Region: Rhône-Alpes
- Rite: Roman Rite
- Ecclesiastical or organisational status: Cathedral
- Status: Active

Location
- Location: Lyon, France
- Interactive map of Lyon Cathedral; Cathedral of Saint John the Baptist of Lyon
- Coordinates: 45°45′38″N 4°49′39″E

Architecture
- Type: church
- Style: Gothic
- Groundbreaking: 1180
- Completed: 1480

Website
- primatiale.fr
- Lyon Cathedral

Administration
- Archdiocese: Lyon

UNESCO World Heritage Site
- Criteria: Cultural: i, ii, iv
- Reference: 872
- Inscription: 1998 (22nd Session)

Monument historique
- Official name: Cathédrale Saint-Jean-Baptiste de Lyon
- Designated: 1862
- Reference no.: PA00117785

Video of the cathedral's astronomical clock

Lyon Cathedral or the Cathedral of Saint John the Baptist of Lyon (French: Cathédrale Saint-Jean-Baptiste de Lyon) is a Roman Catholic church located on Place Saint-Jean in central Lyon, France. The cathedral is dedicated to Saint John the Baptist, and is the seat of the Archbishop of Lyon. Begun in 1180 on the ruins of a 6th-century church, it was completed in 1476. Despite its long construction time, it has a relatively consistent architectural style. In 1998, the building, along with other historic sites in the center of Lyon, was inscribed on the UNESCO World Heritage List.

== History ==
The origins of the cathedral date to the 2nd century, when a church was founded by Saint Pothinus and Saint Irenaeus, the first two bishops of Lyon in what was then a Roman settlement. The city was one of the first cities in Gaul to have such a building, along with Trier, Tours, Auxerre, and Clermont-Ferrand. The church was expanded in 469 by Patiens, Bishop of Lyon, who also renovated the neighboring church of Saint-Étienne. This church was destroyed or at least heavily damaged by Germanic raids after the Fall of the Western Roman Empire and later by Saracen invasions between 725 and 737. A new church was built by Leidrade, the last bishop of Lyon at the beginning of the 9th century. This new Bavarian bishop was expressly appointed by Charlemagne to restore a church in decline. The cathedral is also known as a "Primatiale" bcause in 1079 Pope Gregory VII granted to the archbishop of Lyon the title of Primate of All the Gauls with the legal supremacy over the principal archbishops of the kingdom.

Patiens of Lyon, who was bishop around 450 AD, built a new cathedral, dedicated to Saint Stephen. Later, in the seventh century, a baptistery dedicated to Saint John was constructed as an accessory building to the church. The Church of St. Croix was also near. This location later became the site of the Cathédrale Saint-Jean-Baptiste.

In 1245, the cathedral hosted the First Council of Lyon.

In 1819 J. M. W. Turner sketched a study of the cathedral as seen from the heights of the Fourvière Hill. Edgar Degas used the cathedral for the setting of his painting "Ceremony of Ordination at Lyon Cathedral."

=== Festival of Light ===
Each December, Lyon holds an annual Festival of Lights. The tradition dates to 1643, when on 8 December the people of Lyon would place a lit candle in the window, a custom still maintained by many residents to this day. During the festival, a choreographed lighting display appears on the façade of the cathedral.

== Description ==
The building is 80 meters long (internally), 20 meters wide at the choir, and 32.5 meters high in the nave. The apse and choir are of Romanesque design; the nave and façade are Gothic.

Noteworthy are the two crosses to right and left of the altar, preserved since the Second Council of Lyon of 1274 as a symbol of the union of the churches, and the Bourbon chapel, built by the Cardinal Charles II, Duke of Bourbon, and his brother Pierre de Bourbon, son-in-law of Louis XI, a masterpiece of 15th century sculpture.

The cathedral also has the Lyon astronomical clock from the 14th century.

The cathedral organ was built by Daublaine and Callinet and was installed in 1841 at the end of the apse and had 15 stops. It was rebuilt in 1875 by Merklin-Schütze and given 30 stops, three keyboards of 54 notes and pedals for 27.

Until the construction of the Basilica of Notre-Dame de Fourvière, it was the pre-eminent church in Lyon.

Renowned organist Édouard Commette served as the resident organist for most of the first half of the 20th century.

== Burials ==
- Cardinal Foulon
- Cardinal Gerlier

== Gallery ==
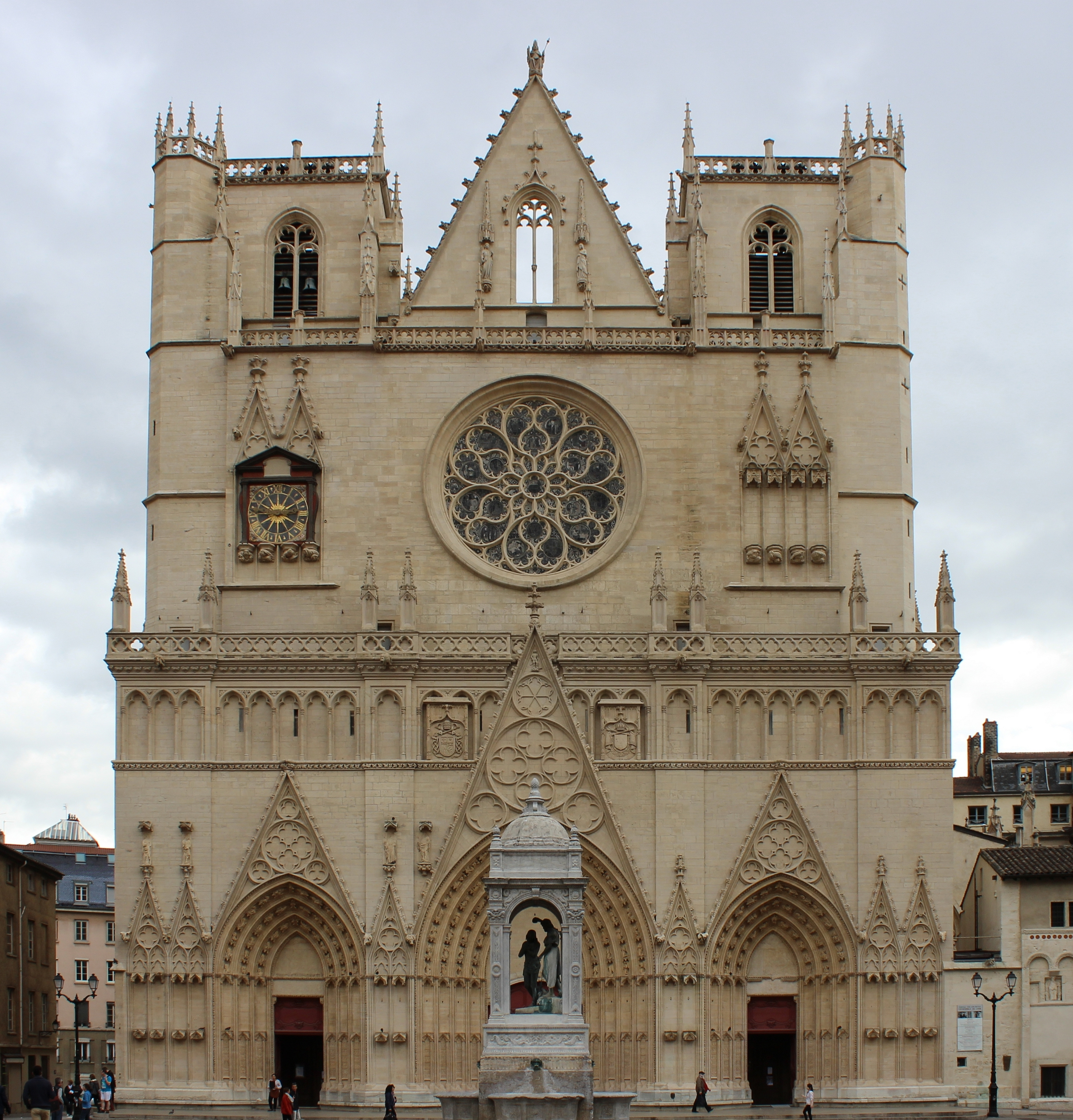
The front elevation of the cathedral

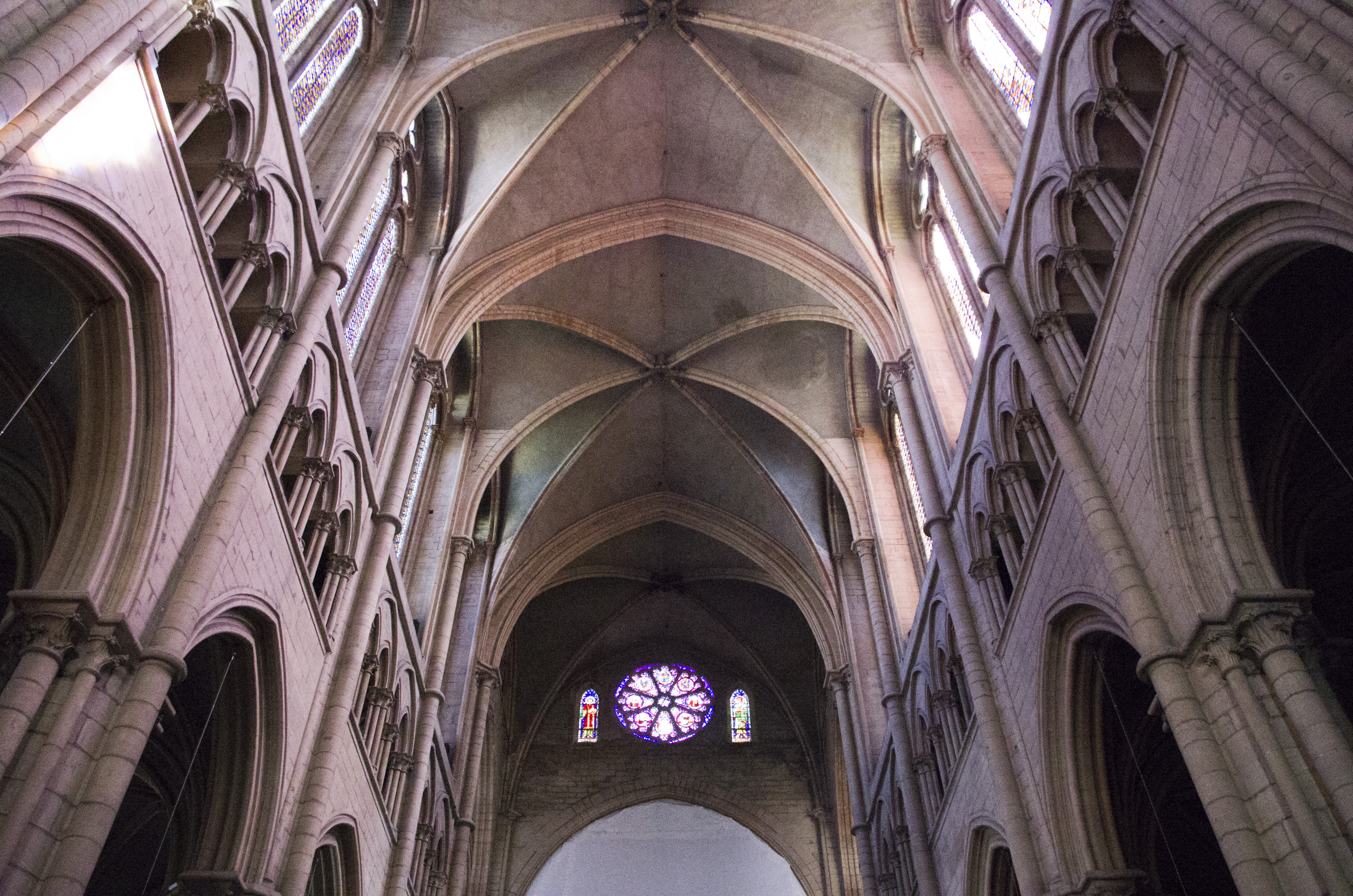
Interior of the cathedral

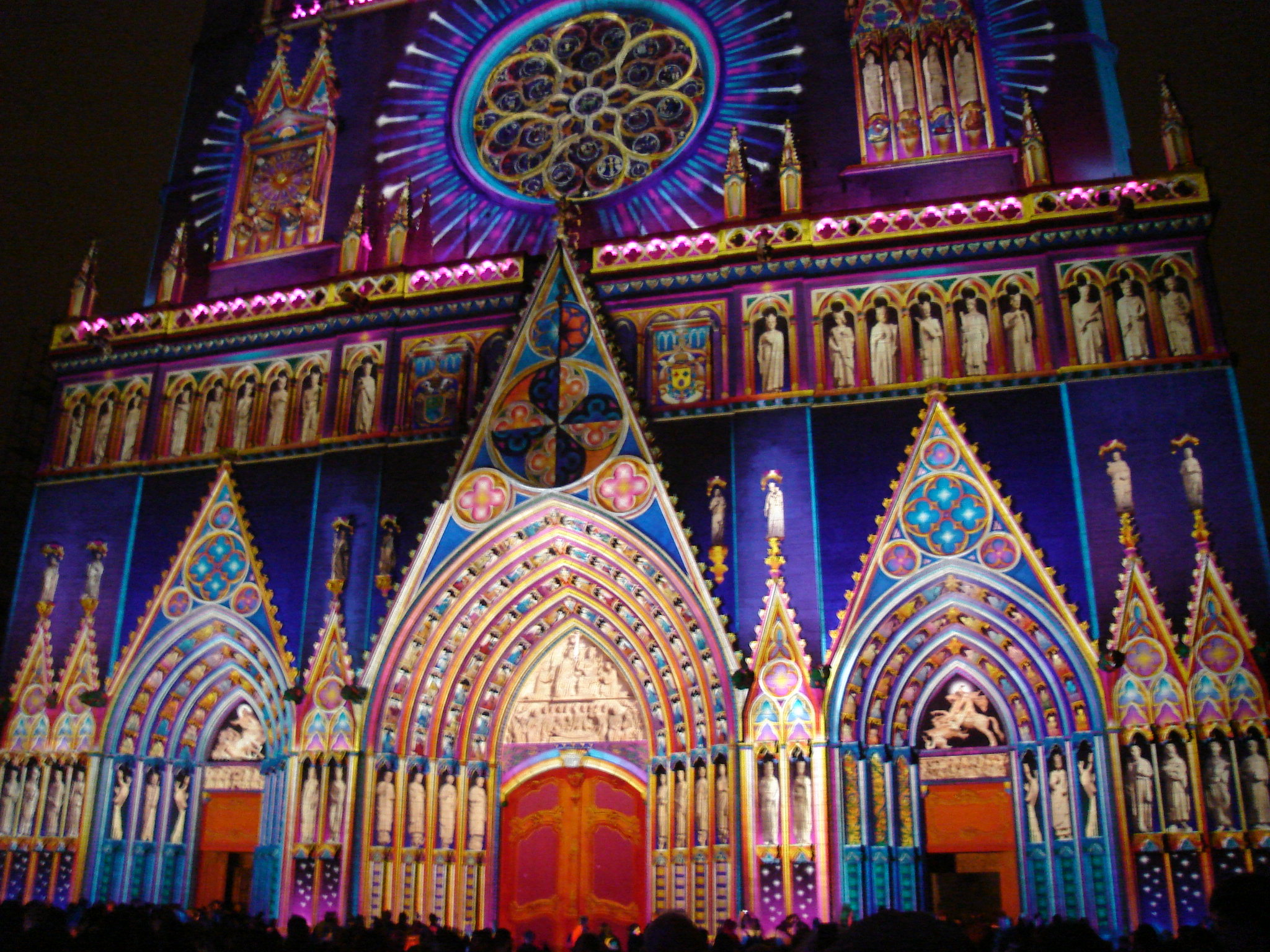
Front elevation of the cathedral by night during Festival of Lights (Lyon)

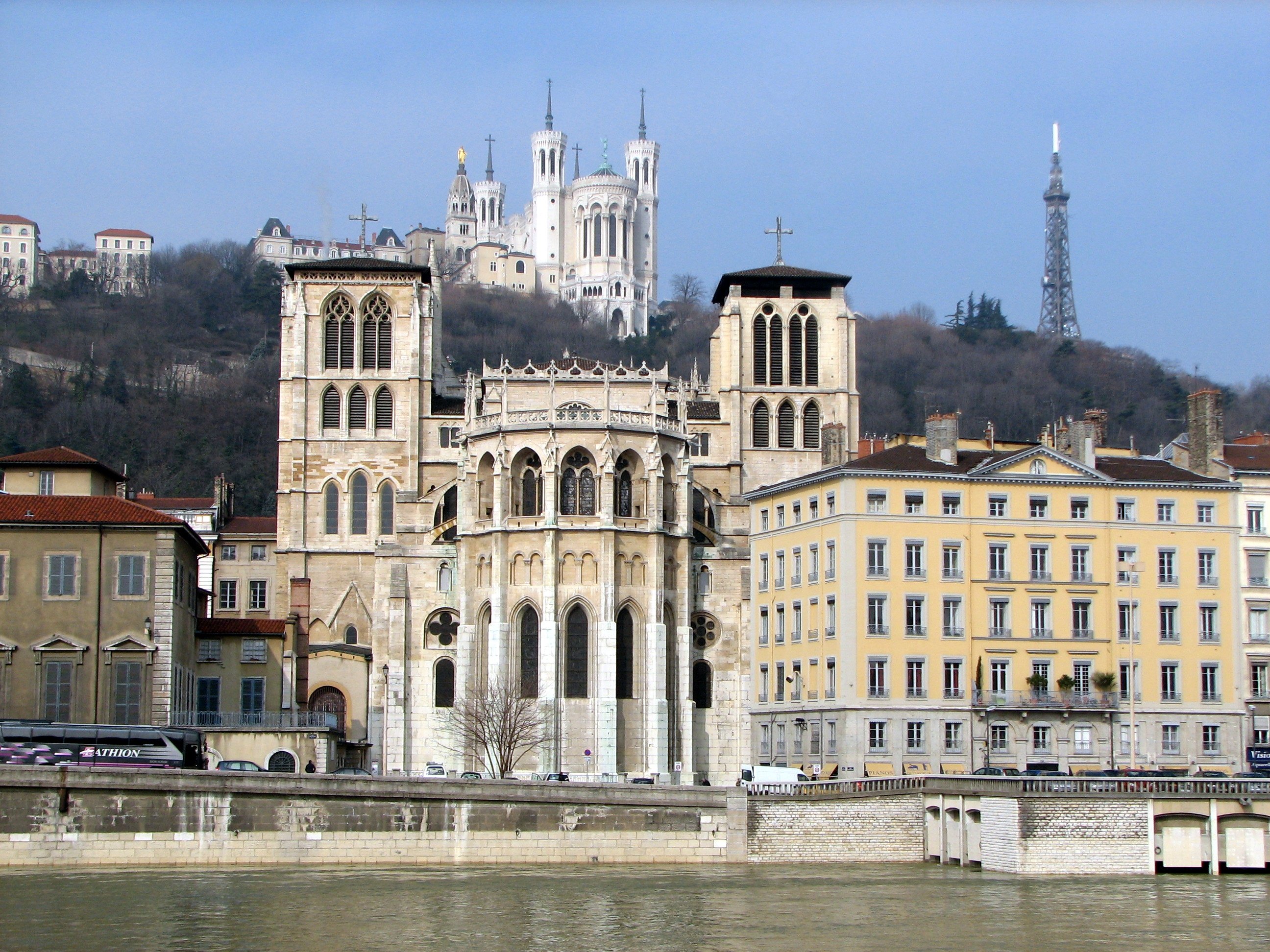
Exterior, overlooked by the Basilica of Notre-Dame de Fourvière

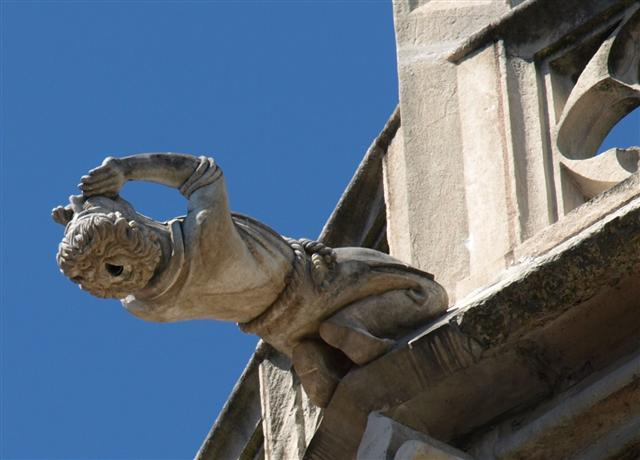
Peter Waldo gargoyle

== Sources ==
- Association Cathédrale de Lyon Primatiale Saint John n.d.

== See also ==
- Basilica of Notre-Dame de Fourvière
- Basilica of Saint-Martin d'Ainay
- Église Saint-Paul
- List of Gothic Cathedrals in Europe
