= Rue de la Bourse =

Street in Lyon, France

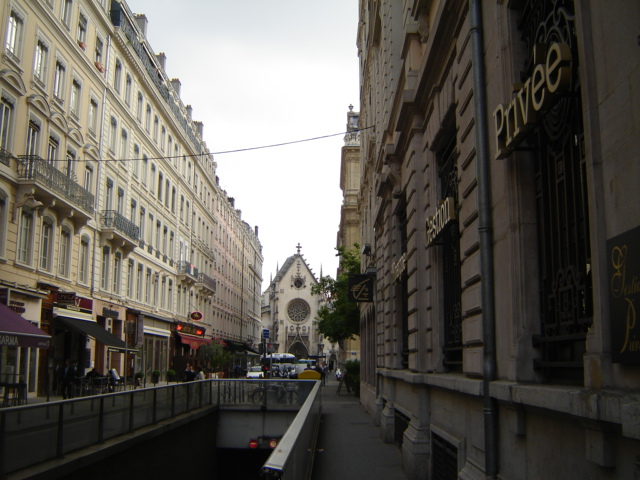
- Part of the street which overlooks the Sanctuaire Saint-Bonaventure
- Interactive map of Rue de la Bourse
- Type: Street
- Location: 1st and 2nd arrondissements of Lyon, Lyon, France
- Postal code: 69001, 69002
- Coordinates: 45.764881°N 4.83688°E

The Rue de la Bourse (French pronunciation: [ʁy də la buʁs]) is a street located mainly in the 2nd arrondissement of Lyon, and also in the 1st arrondissement. It starts on the Place des Cordeliers, in the 2nd arrondissement, in front of the Église Saint-Bonaventure, and ends at right angles to the Rue du Bât-d'Argent, beyond which it is extended by the Rue du Garet.

== History ==
The street was named after the Palais de la Bourse, built between 1855 and 1862, by René Dardel, which is situated in its southern part. In the 17th century, the part along the Collège de la Trinité was named Rue Henri from 1526 to 1528, as tribute to the vicar of Saint Paul parish, Henri Guillermet. In 1528, the northern part of the street was opened and named Rue du Baronnat after the name of one of the owner of the lands, then named Rue du Vert-Galant after a sign at number 13. The southern part was occupied in Roman times, then crossed by the Rue Buisson from the 13th century. In the late 18th century, a famous steakhouse was also installed in the street.

A college was created in 1519 by members of the Brotherhood of the Trinity and became in 1527 the Collège de la Trinité with William Durand as first director. On 1 May 1565, it was transformed into a Jesuit company. In 1607, the new college Collège-lycée Ampère was built after plans by Étienne Martellange, and Archbishop Denis-Simon de Marquemont blessed the first stone. After being enlarged in 1619 and destroyed by fire in 1644, it was given to the Oratorians in 1763.

The street was built by the main contractors of the Rue Impériale (current Rue de la Republique), which were 58, gathered in company under the stewardship of Guigue. At the time, the architecture of the street was made by Échernier who was the manager.

== Architecture ==
The long facades are stretched in a repetitive process. At numbers 29-31, there is the Chapelle de la Trinité, a baroque-style church built in the 17th century.

To the west, the house with a big drum engraved above the door, in which famous revolutionary Marie Joseph Chalier lived, was built in 1670. Then there are buildings constructed mostly around 1850. In front of them, at the corner with rue Gential, there is a Caisse d'Epargne bank, founded under the direction of Charvet on 11 September 1822 and originally located on the ground floor of the City Hall, but moved there in 1859. There are also two women in transom made by Bellemain in 1903. There is a fountain made of black granite.

At No. 2, there is a carved sign above the door with the words "Au grand tambour". The facade of the No. 2 on the square was made by Bresson and the caryatids by Guillaume Bonnet.
