= Rue du Bât-d'Argent =

Thoroughfare in Lyon, France

- Rue du Pet Étroit
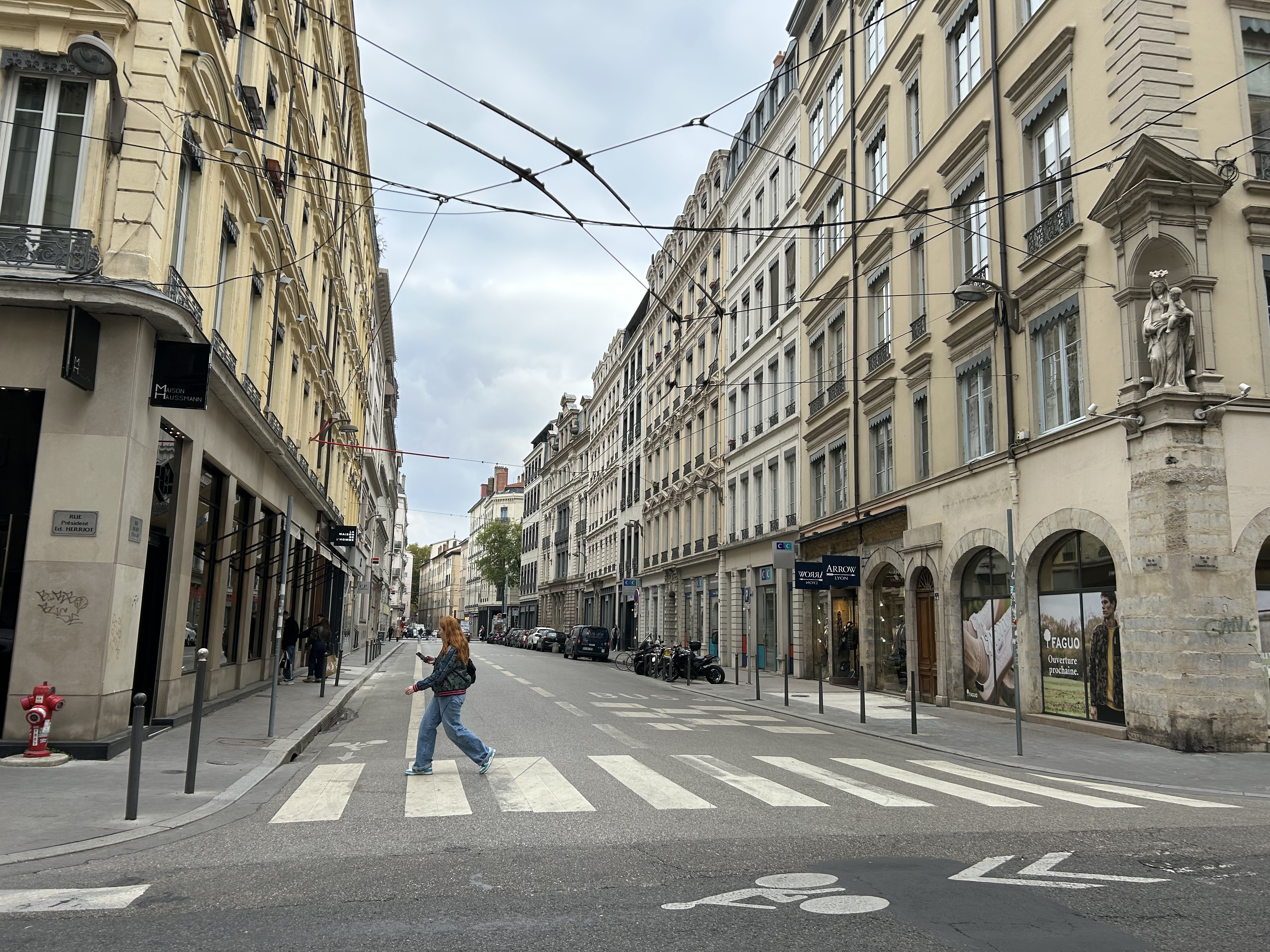
- The street captured in 2025, from its beginning on rue Édouard-Herriot.
- Interactive map of Rue du Bât-d'Argent
- Former name: Pas Étroit
- Type: Street
- Location: 1st arrondissement of Lyon, Lyon, France
- Postal code: 69001
- Coordinates: 45.76612°N 4.836431°E

Construction
- Construction start: Middle Ages

The Rue du Bât-d'Argent is an old street which crosses perpendicularly a part of the Presqu'île quarter in the 1st arrondissement of Lyon. It begins at the Rue Édouard-Herriot, in continuation of the Rue du Plâtre, crosses the Rue de la République and the Rue du Garet, and ends on the Quai Jean Moulin. The street is famous for its college, the Collège-lycée Ampère.

== History ==
The street was created in the late Middle Ages. In 1793, the Jacobin Club had its meetings in the north part.

The part of the street located between the Rue du Garet and the embankment was opened in 1551. The street was originally named Rue du Pet Étroit (also spelled Pet Estroit, already attested in 1350) because of its narrowness and its foul smell at the time and Rue du Pas Étroit (or Étrée, according to another source) in the 17th century, and finally Rue du Bât-d'Argent. The street was named thus in reference to the trade of bourrelier and this noun would come from a gold shop sign located at No. 11 (other ancient authors say the sign was at No. 17). In 1827, nine looms were still in the street. The city of Lyon bought many buildings between 1844 and 1883 to widen the street and modify the immediate neighborhood. Hospices, located at No. 13, were purchased for 210,000 francs in 1859. In 1890, the Municipal Laboratory of Slaughter, used for public vaccinations, was installed at No. 21. At number 8, at the corner of the Rue de la Republique, the restaurant of chocolate maker Casati was wrecked in 1894, when Sadi Carnot was murdered.

In the end, towards the embankment, there was a vault of communication between the college and the house at the northern corner of the street. The two were linked by the game hall of the college, which became in 1793 the Club Central. The vault was demolished.

The papillote was created in the street by an apprentice pastrycook who sent sweets wrapped in love letters to his fiancée, and whose boss was named Mr Papillot. In the nineteenth century, most manufacturers or sellers of saddles of the city settled here.

Many famous people have lived in this street, including sculptor Antoine Coysevox in the 17th century (he sculpted a Virgin statue in 1676-77 which remained a few time at the corner of the Rue du Bât-d'Argent and the Rue de l'Hôtel de Ville), André-Marie Ampère and his wife in 1800, Stendhal in 1837, painters Jean-Pierre Crolle and François Nolin (18th century), and Alphonse Daudet.

== Architecture ==
The street currently begins with a very wide section composed of four-floor buildings of around the 1950s; there is still an 18th-century house at the intersection of the Rue de la Bourse. Already in the 18th century, the No. 18 was composed of different rooms with their own function, and even children had their bedroom, which was quite rare at the time.

Formerly placed at No. 2, at the corner with the Rue Édouard-Hérriot, the Madonna and Child sculpted by Coysevox around 1676 is considered as a baroque masterpiece and has been preserved since 1771 at the Église Saint-Nizier.

== Photos ==
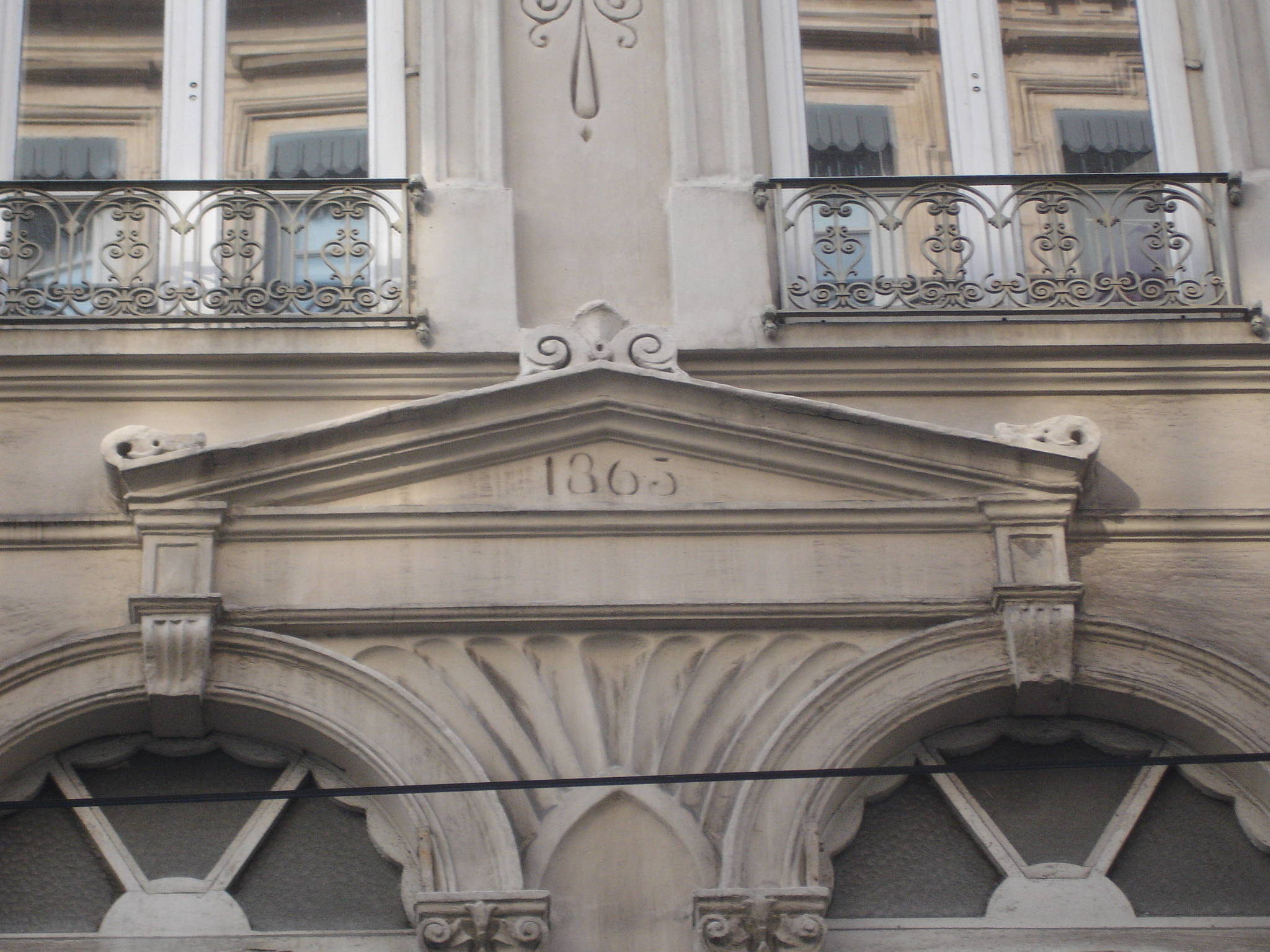
1865 fronton

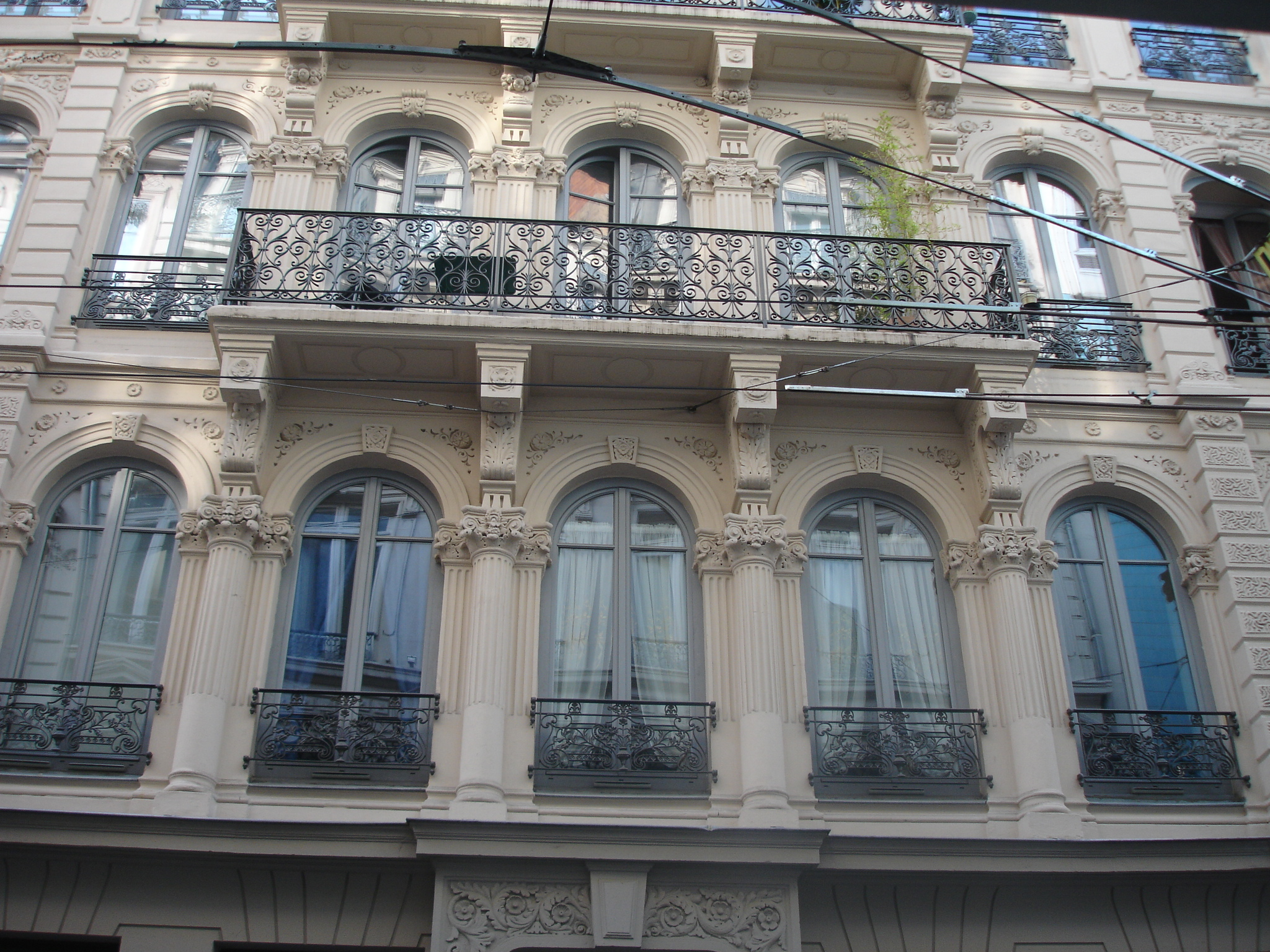
Building with arches

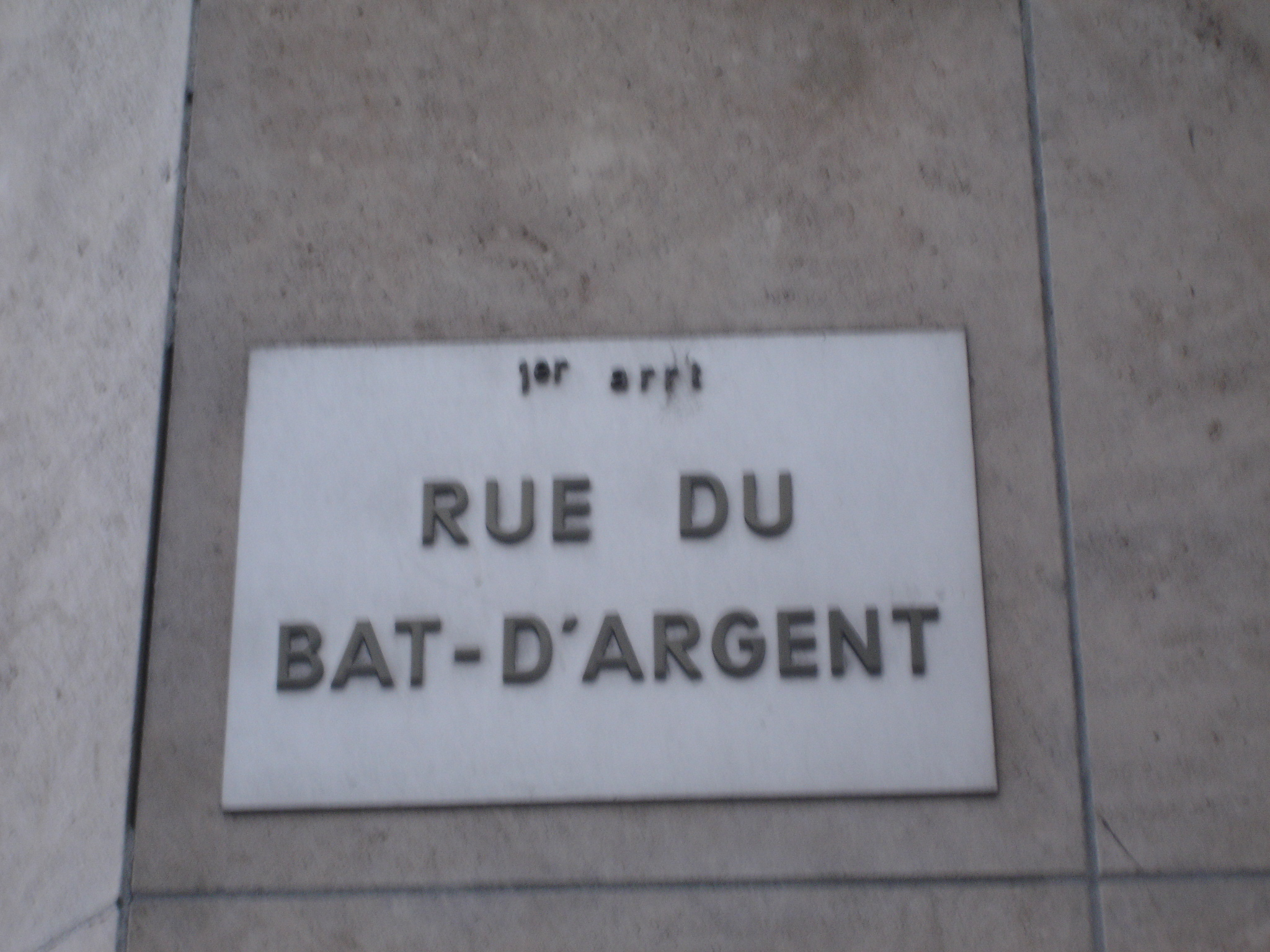
Plaque

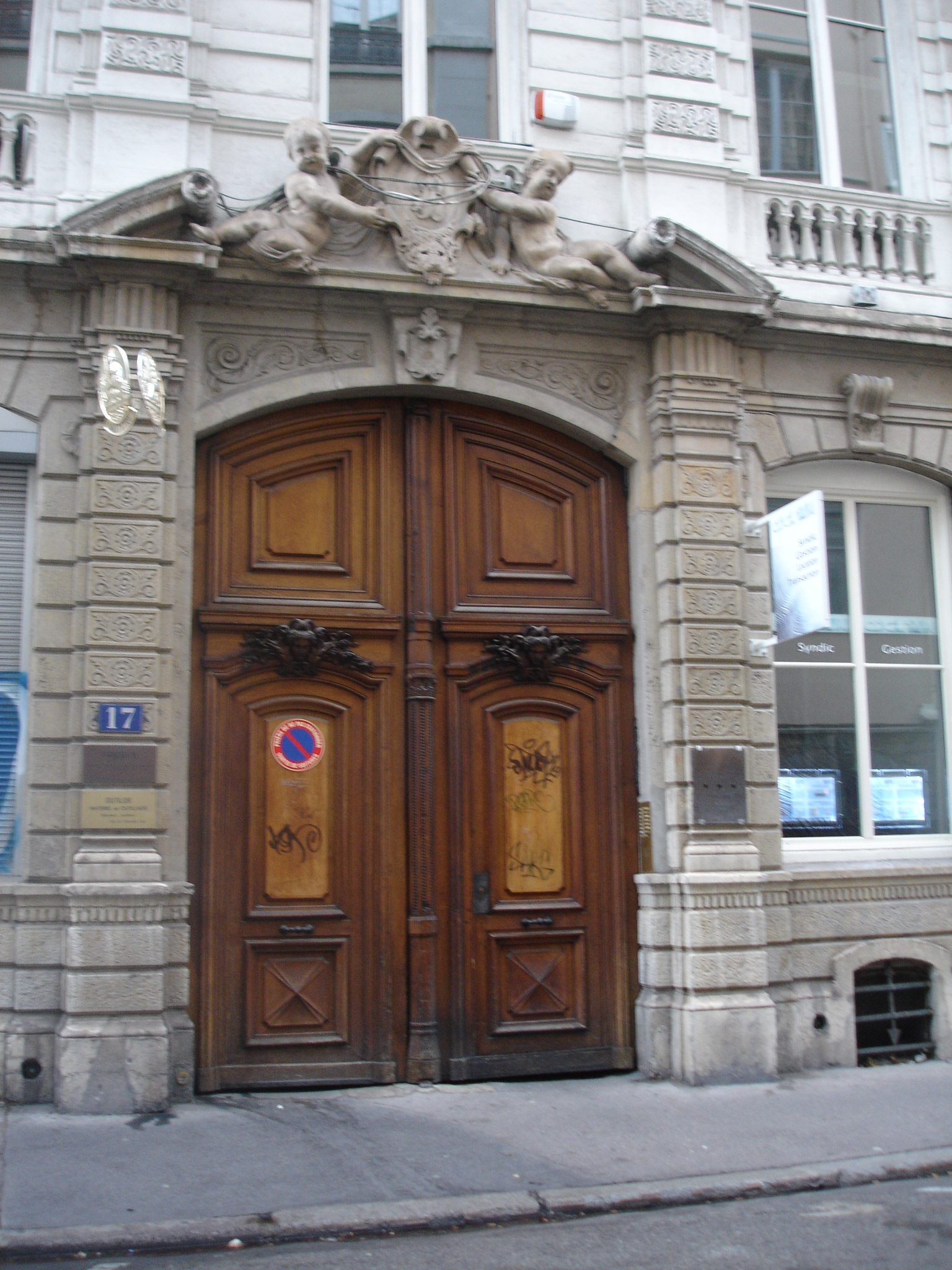
19th century building

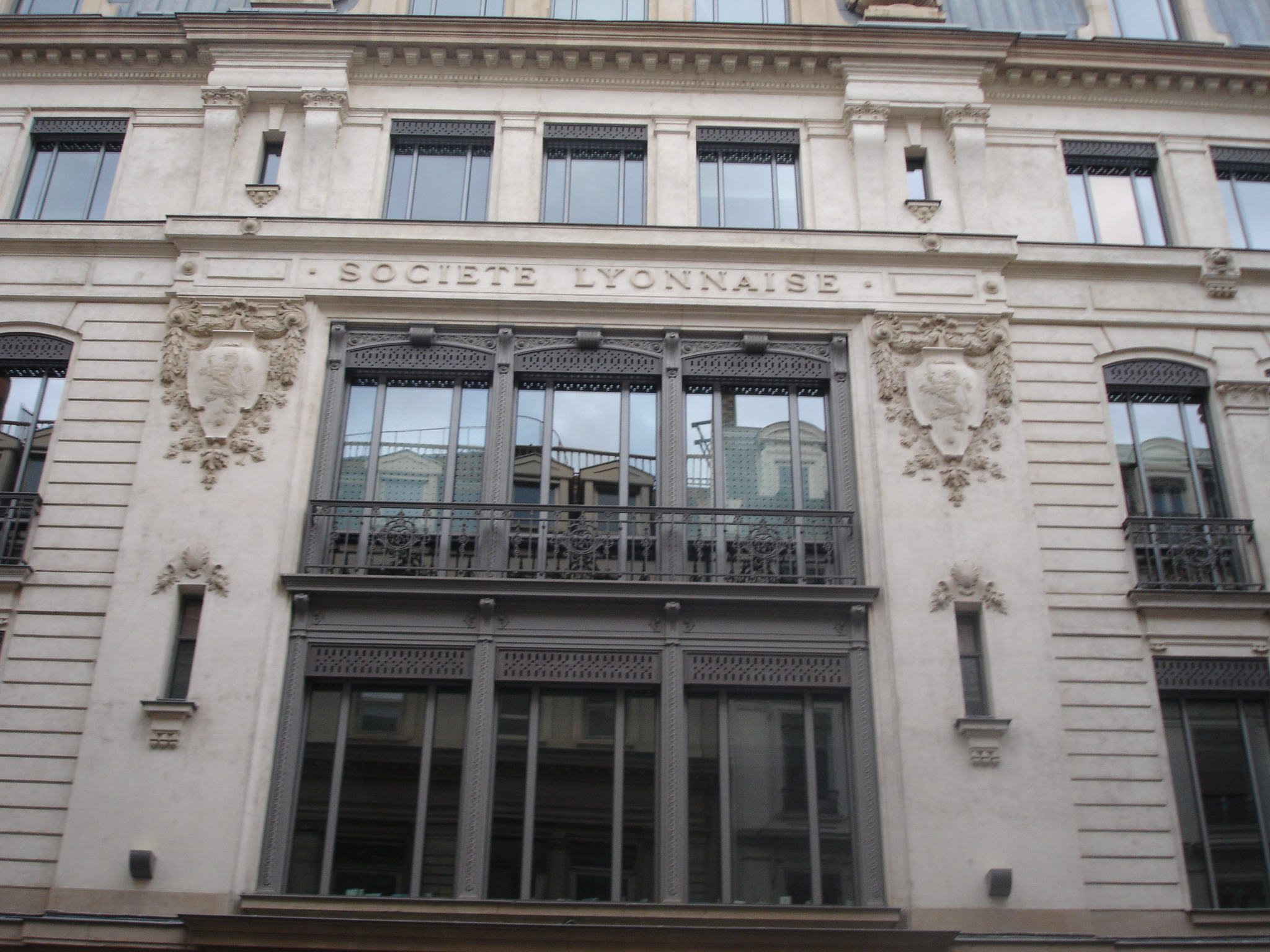
Lyon society
