= La Sucrière =

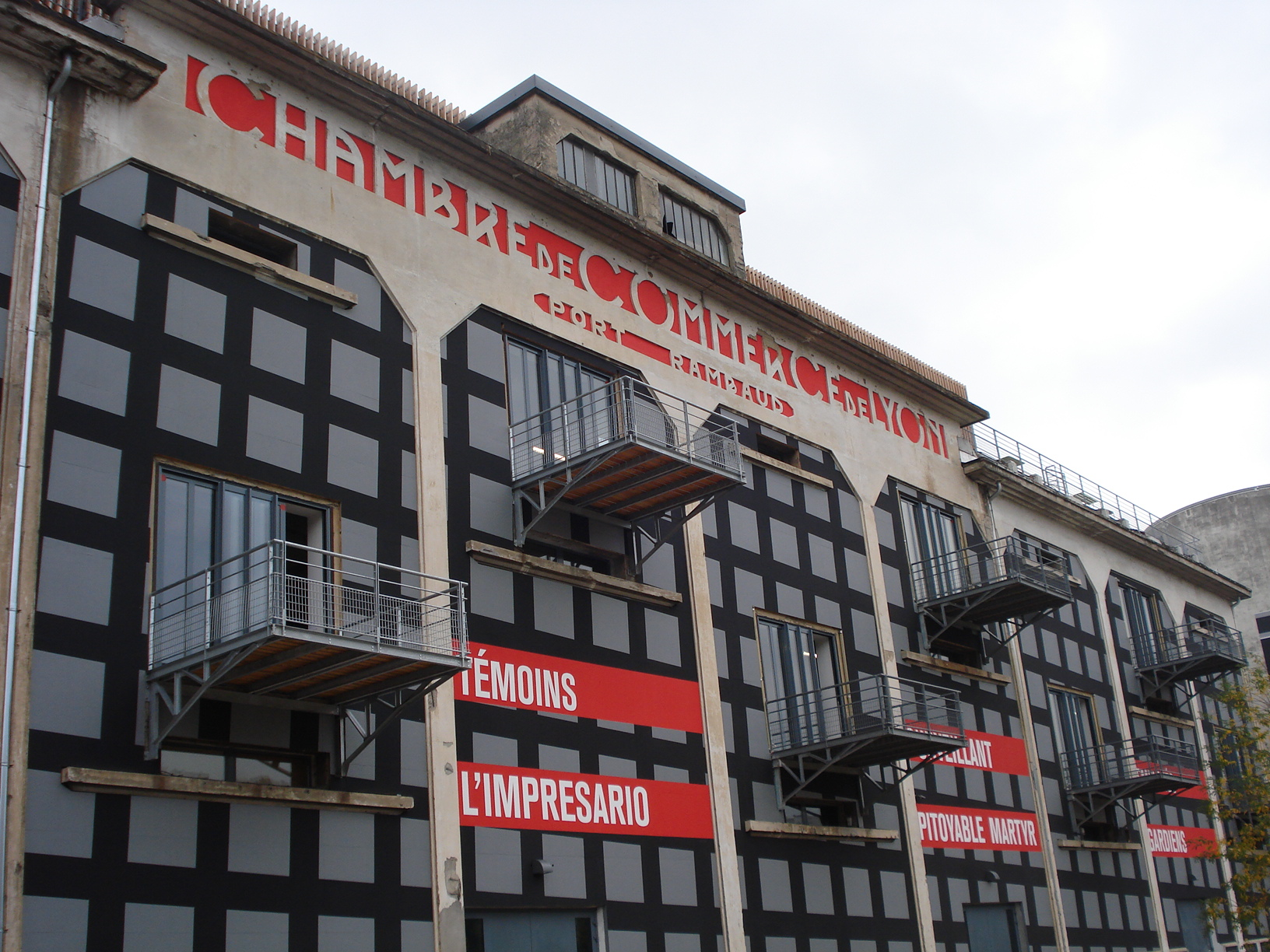
- Facade of the Museum.
- Established: 2003
- Location: 48, Quai Rambaud; 69001 Lyon, France
- Coordinates: 45.737094°N 4.814908°E
- Type: Art museum

La Sucrière ([la sy.kʁi.jɛʁ], "The Sugar-House") is a building devoted to contemporary art, situated 48 Quai Rambaud, on the banks of the Saône in the Confluence quarter of the 2nd arrondissement of Lyon.

== History ==
It was built in 1930, and was originally used for a factory warehouse in which sugar was stored. It was enlarged in 1960, and finally abandoned in 1990. Three silos were built to the south in 1976. The building was completely renovated in 2003 by architect William Vassal to turn it into a place for exhibitions of contemporary art. It has thus became the main venue of the Biennale of Contemporary Art in Lyon from 2007. Its 9,000 m^{2} (97,000 sq ft) area spread on three floor houses a complex and original architecture.

In 2008, an exhibition of flayed bodies caused a controversy about the origin of the corpses. The exhibition attracted 4,000 visitors per week.
