= 2nd arrondissement of Lyon =

- Municipal arrondissement
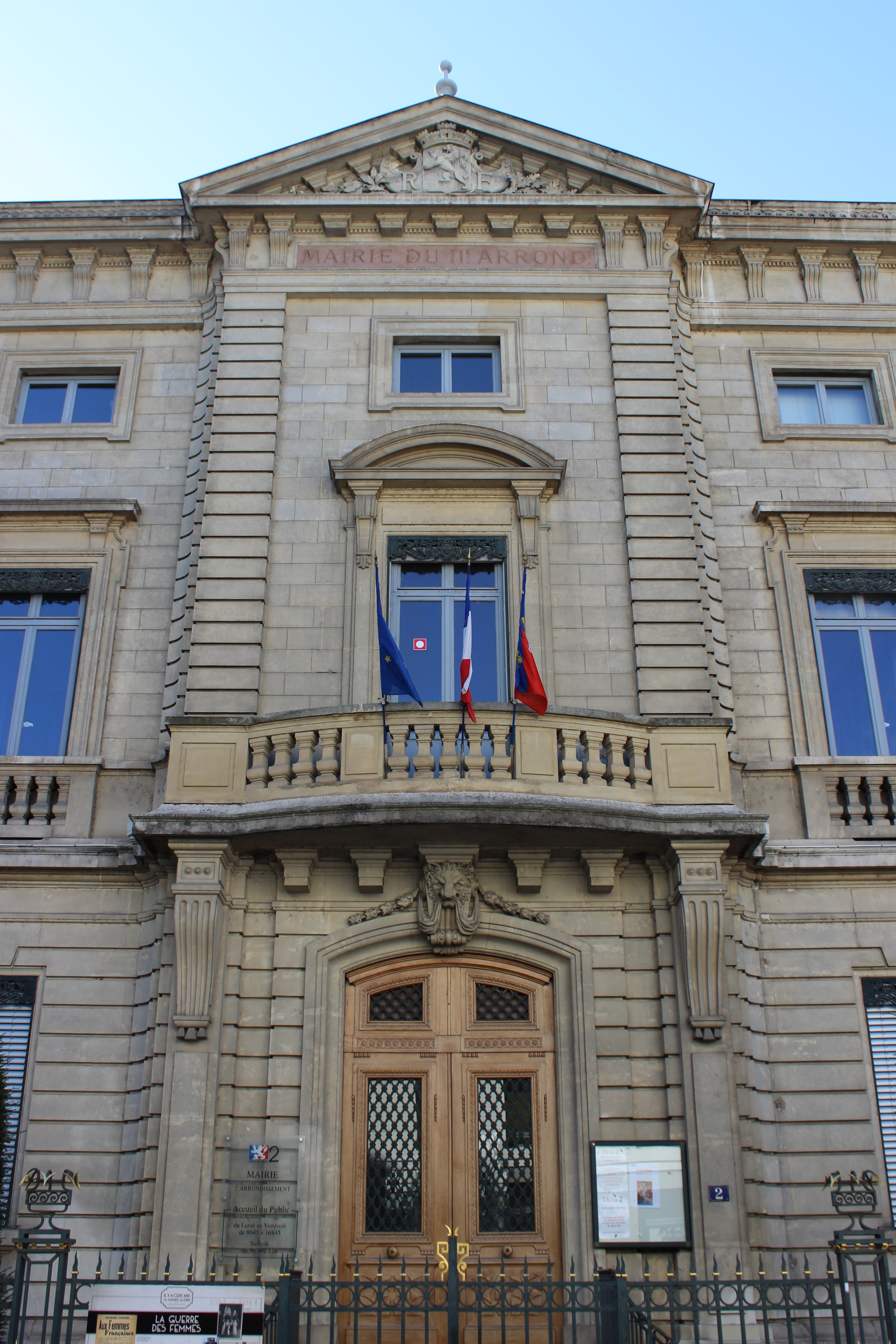
- View of the mairie of the 2nd arrondissement

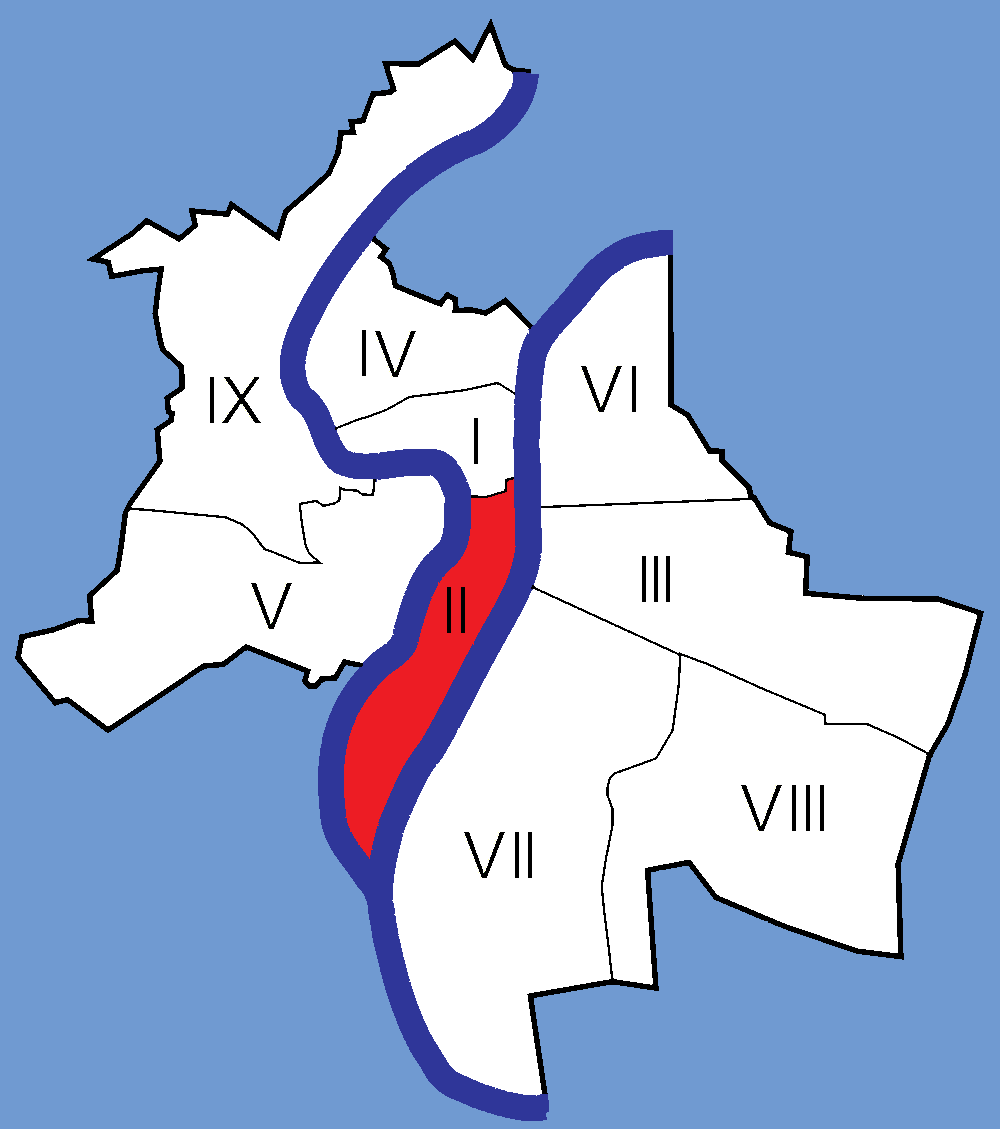
- Location within Lyon
- Coordinates: 45°45′15″N 4°49′45″E
- Country: France
- Region: Auvergne-Rhône-Alpes
- Department: Lyon Metropolis
- Commune: Lyon

Government
  - Mayor (2020–2026): Pierre Oliver (LR)
- Area: 3.41 km^{2} (1.32 sq mi)
- Population (2023): 29,981
  - Density: 8,790/km^{2} (22,800/sq mi)
- INSEE code: 69382

The nine arrondissements of Lyon

Arrondissements of Lyon

The 2nd arrondissement of Lyon (French: 2^{e} arrondissement de Lyon) is one of the nine arrondissements of the City of Lyon.

== History ==
The first five arrondissements of Lyon were created by the Decree of March 24, 1852, which included the 2nd arrondissement.

== Geography ==
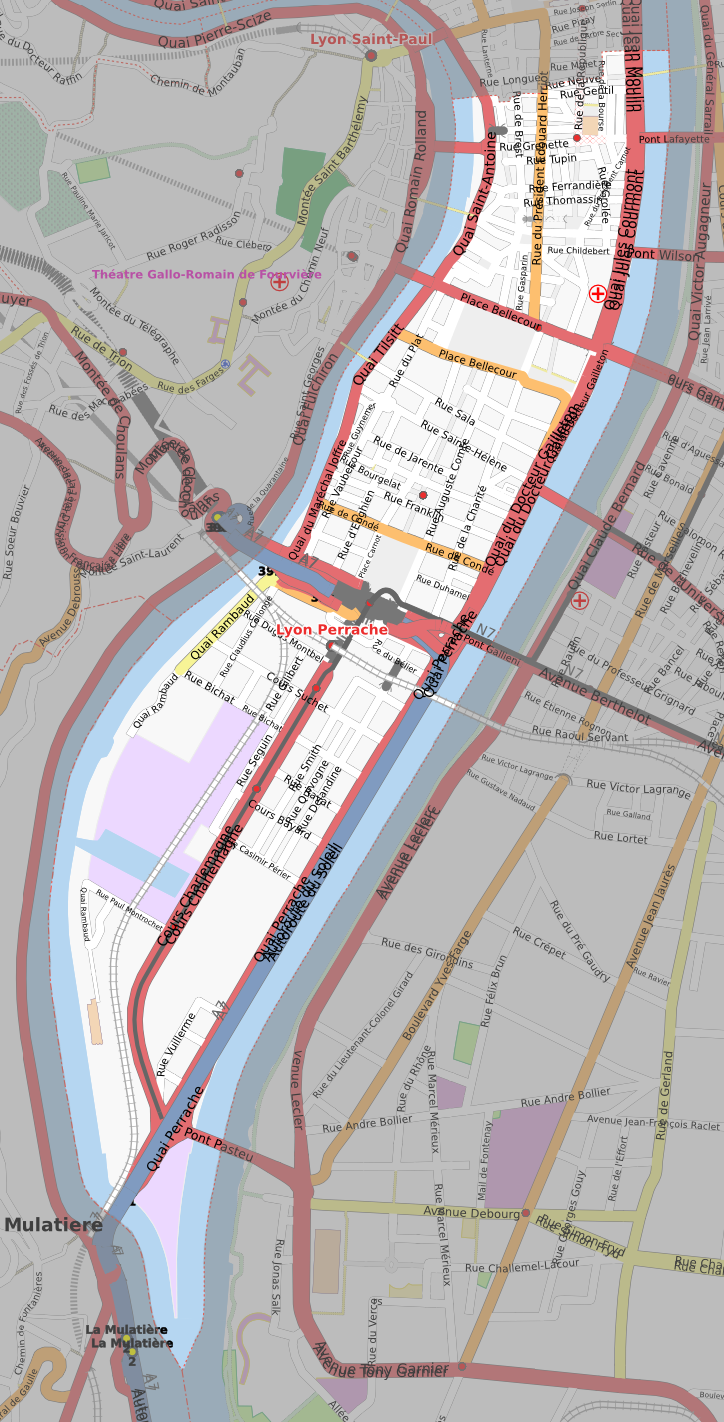
Plan of the 2nd arrondissement of Lyon

=== Area and demographics ===
The 2nd arrondissement is the most commercial and most active of Lyon.

- Area: 341 ha (840 acres)
- 1990 : 27,971 inhabitants
- 2006 : 30,276 inhabitants
- Relative density : 8,204 inhabitants per square kilometre (21,250/sq mi)

=== Districts ===
The districts (quarters) of the 2nd arrondissement are :

- Les Cordeliers
- Bellecour
- Les Célestins
- La Confluence
- Ainay
- Perrache
- Sainte-Blandine

=== Streets and squares ===
- Cours Charlemagne
- Cours de Verdun
- Cours Suchet
- Passage de l'Argue
- Palais de la Bourse
- Place Ampère
- Place Bellecour
- Place Antonin-Poncet
- Place Carnot
- Place de la République
- Place des Célestins
- Place des Jacobins
- Quai Jules Courmont
- Quai Rambaud
- Rue de Brest
- Rue de la Bourse
- Rue de la Poulaillerie
- Rue de la République
- Rue des Archers
- Rue des Marronniers
- Rue Édouard-Herriot
- Rue Émile-Zola
- Rue Mercière
- Rue Victor-Hugo

== Landmarks and monuments ==
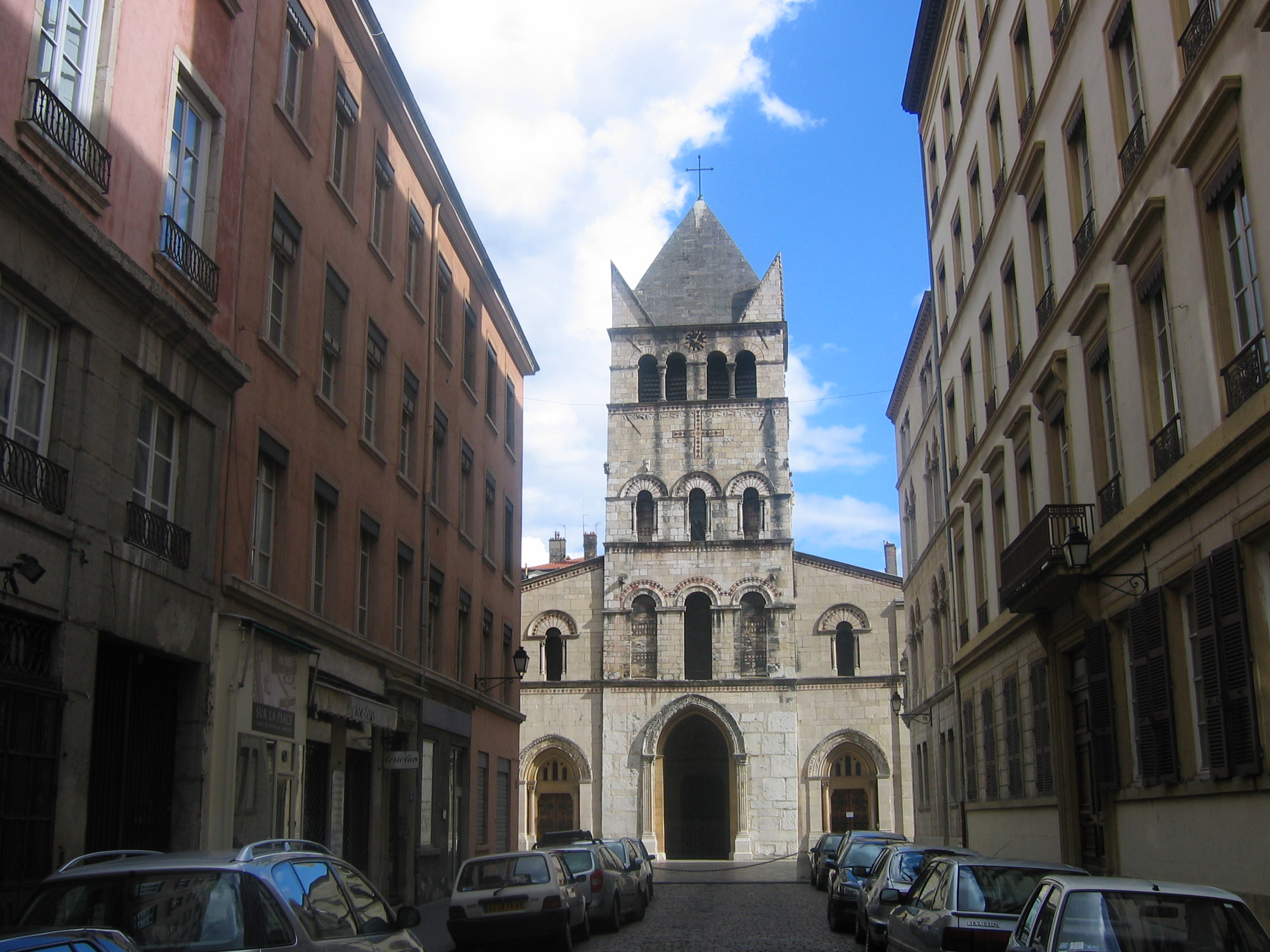
St-Martin-d'Ainay

Musée des Confluences

- Basilique Saint-Martin d'Ainay
- Brasserie Georges
- Église Saint-Bonaventure
- Grande synagogue de Lyon
- La Bourse du Commerce
- Hôtel des Finances
- Hôtel Terminus
- Prison Saint-Paul
- Collège-lycée Ampère
- Musée des Confluences
- Musée de l'Imprimerie
- Chapelle de la Trinité
- Patinoire Charlemagne
- La Sucrière
- Orange Cube

== Transports ==
This arrondissement is served by metro and tram lines of TCL network:

- at Cordeliers, Bellecour, Ampère - Victor Hugo and Perrache (terminus)
- at Bellecour
- at Perrache, Place des Archives, Sainte-Blandine, Hôtel de Région - Montrochet and Musée des Confluences
- at Perrache, Place des Archives, Sainte-Blandine and Hôtel de Région - Montrochet (terminus)

The 2nd arrondissement is also served by Lyon-Perrache station, the second most important railway station in Lyon.

== See also ==
- Arrondissements of Lyon
- List of the streets in Lyon
