= Brasserie Georges =

Restaurant in the 2nd arrondissement of Lyon, France

Coordinates: 45°44′54″N 4°49′42″E

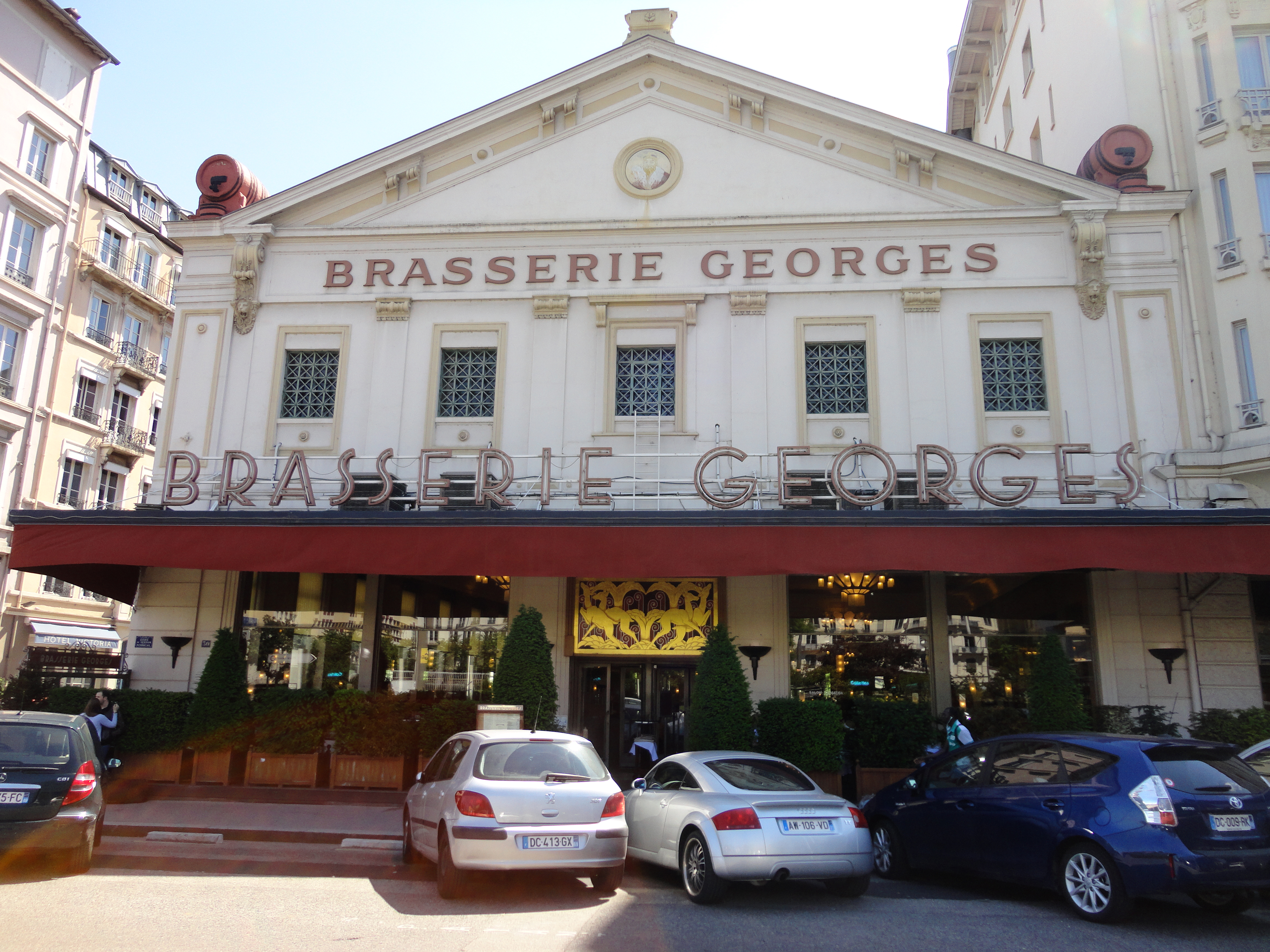
Brasserie Georges.

The Brasserie Georges is a restaurant located in the 2nd arrondissement of Lyon. It is the oldest brasserie in the city and one of the largest brasseries in Europe. Its reputation is now international. With a history closely linked to that of Lyon, the brasserie serves typical dishes including the famous sausage of Lyon with pistachios, and recipes from other regions such as sauerkraut, baked Alaska or seafood. In 1986 the brasserie served the biggest sauerkraut in the world; it weighed a ton and a half. In 1996, the largest baked Alaska (34 metres) was served. The Brasserie Georges brews its own beer, a tradition from its inception, when water in Lyon was considered of exceptional quality. The restaurant never closes throughout the year. Over 700 guests can be served at each service. On 8 December, during the fête des lumières, over 2,500 meals were served in a service. It is sometimes called the BG or Le Georges.

== History ==
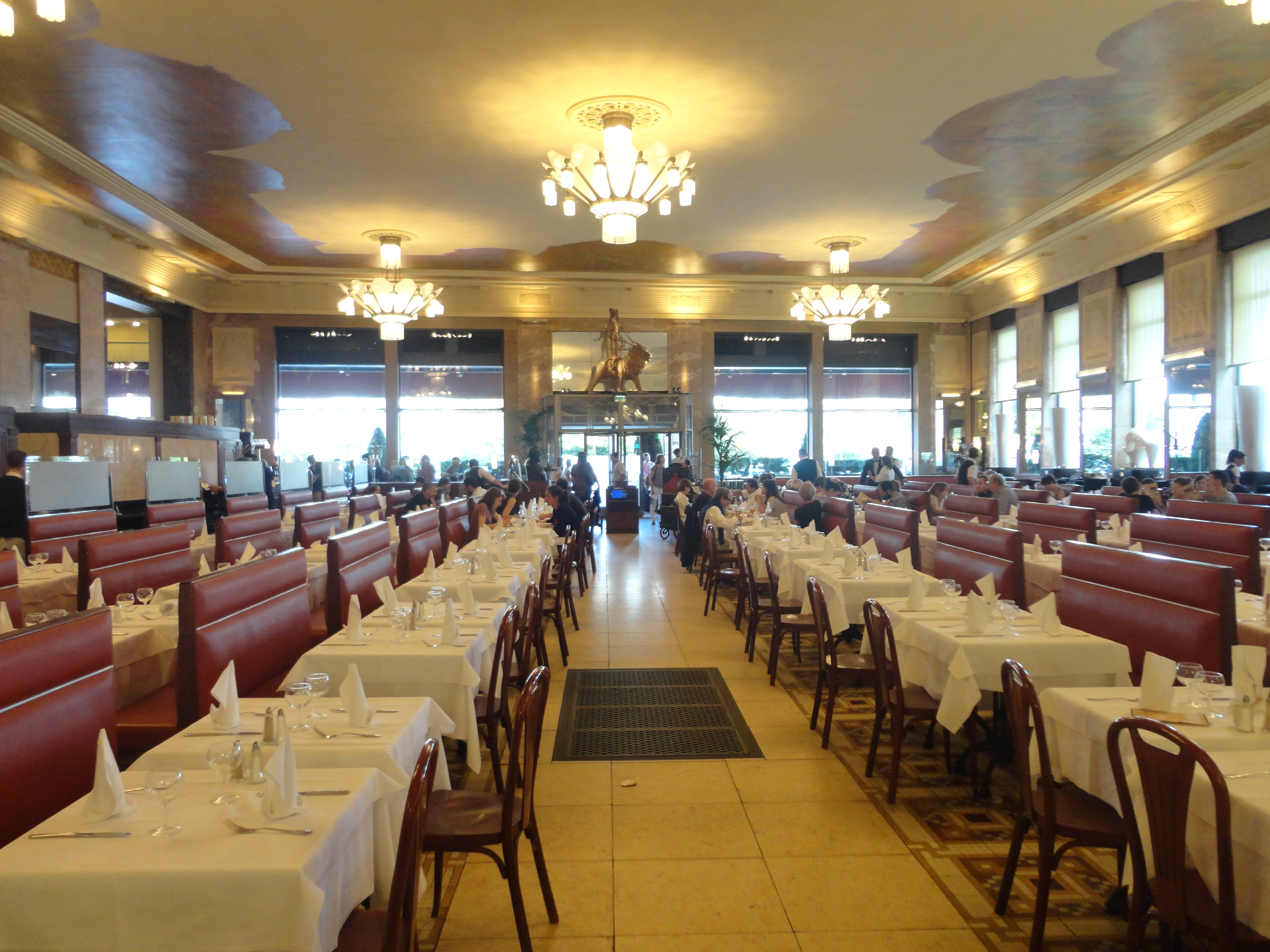
Dining room.

The brasserie was built in 1836 by Georges Hoffherr, from Alsace, and was opened the same year. The location of the brasserie, on a land reclaimed from the swamps of the confluence of the Saône and the Rhône, was chosen because it corresponded to the stage coaches on the axis Paris-Lyon-Saint-Étienne-Marseille. On 1 June 1857, Perrache station opened next to the Brasserie Georges. The construction of the Brasserie Georges was an architectural challenge: 710 m² ceiling are supported only by four 25-foot fir beams, brought from Chartreuse by oxen.

In 1873, after the death of Georges Hoffherr, his son-in-law, Matthew Umdenstock took over the business. After the 1870 war, the Brasserie Georges had 18 maids called "Hébésé" (goddess of youth), of Alsatian origin for most. In 1879, the Brasserie Georges and Brasserie Rinck are, with Antoine Lumière, the first ones of the Lyon city to get their own electric lighting.

In 1890, the red leatherette banquettes and the tables replaced the straw chairs and long tables in walnut. A pediment bearing the image of Gambrinus is framed by two barrels of beer. In the late nineteenth century, the brasserie had five pool tables and walls were painted with a backdrop composed of vegetation with animals such as peacocks and monkeys.

In 1924, painter Bruno Guillermin redecorated the dining room in an Art Deco style.

== Architecture ==
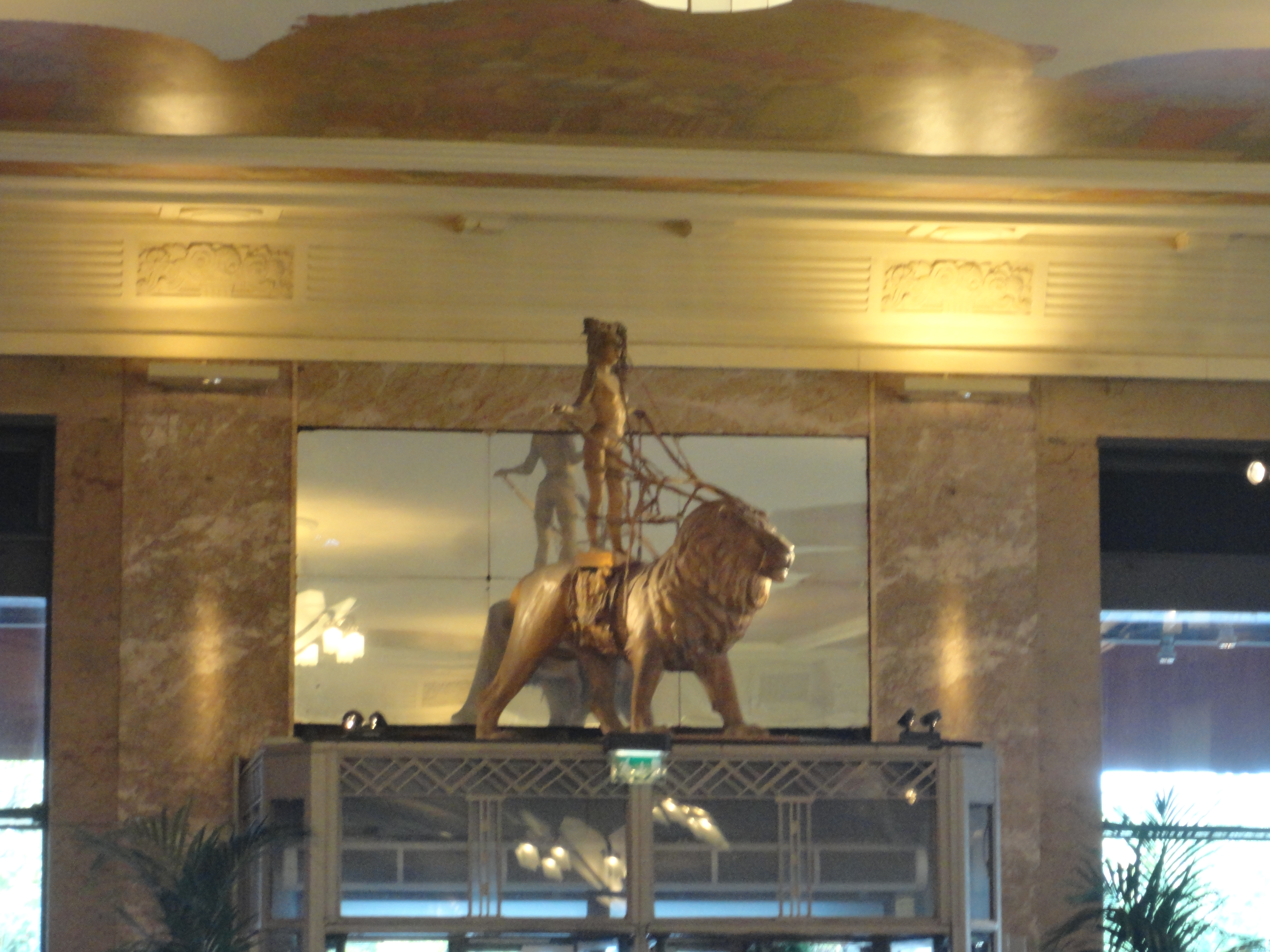
Entrance.

The outside sign of the Brasserie Georges was made in 1946. On the facade, there is a portrait of Gambrinus, the king of beer.

In the entrance, four windows from the early twentieth century represent sculpture, geography, painting and music. Above the entrance there is a huge copper cauldron decorated with a head of lion.

== Famous people ==
Many famous people have eaten in the restaurant, including Paul Verlaine, Jules Verne, Émile Zola, Édith Piaf, Colette, Ernest Hemingway, Jacques Brel, Alphonse Daudet, Anatole France, Léon Blum, Auguste and Louis Lumière, Luis Mariano, Auguste Rodin and many others. Alphonse de Lamartine, who ate there frequently, would have left a slate of 40 francs. Twelve ministers have come to restore it in 1995. Bernadette Chirac ate there in 1998 and 1999.
