= Cours Charlemagne =

Street in Lyon, France

Coordinates: 45.7428°N 4.8209°E

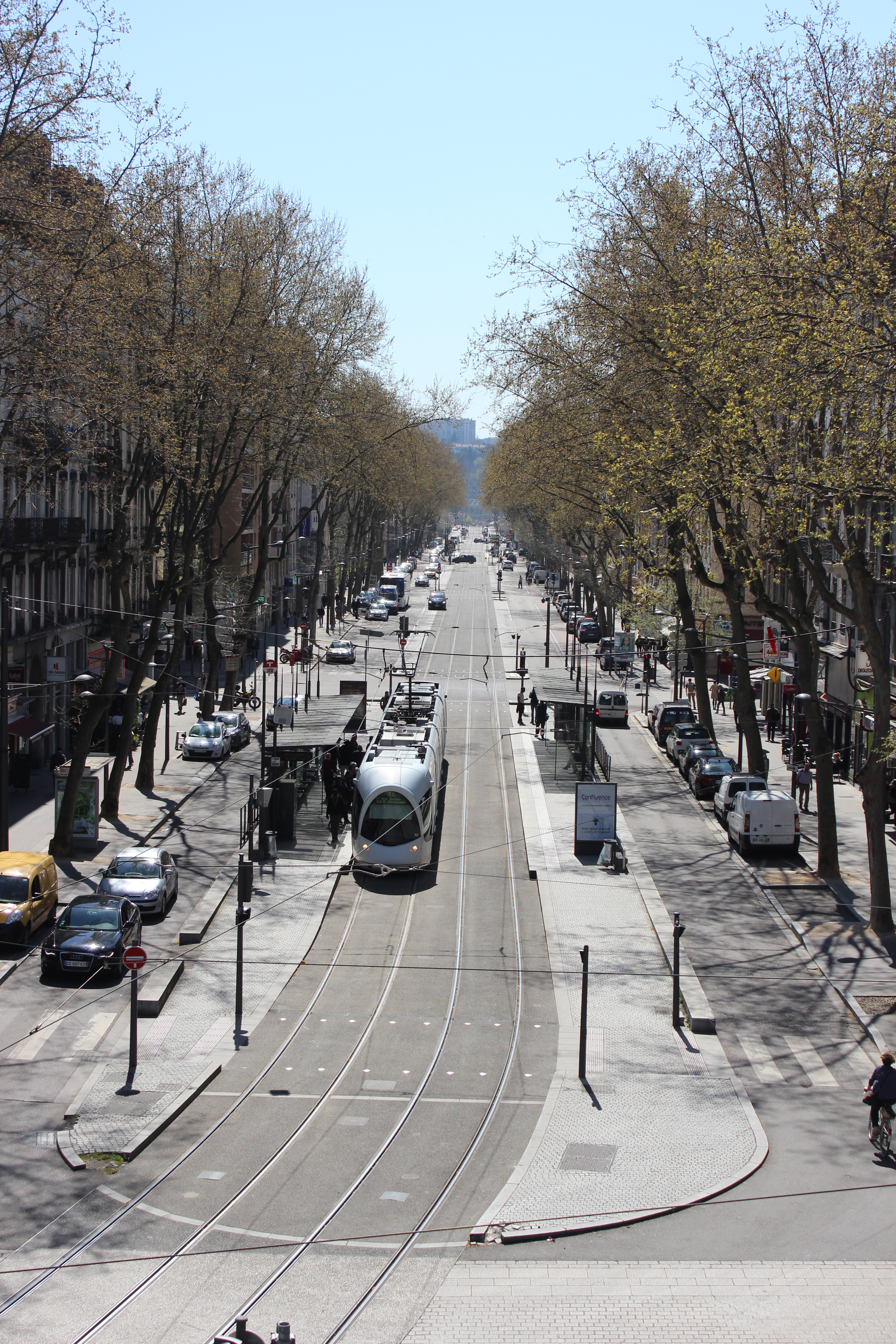
- Interactive map of Cours Charlemagne
- Width: 33 m
- Location: 2nd arrondissement of Lyon, Lyon, France
- Postal code: 69002

Construction
- Construction start: 1806
- Completion: 1826

The Cours Charlemagne is a large central street located in the Perrache quarter, in the 2nd arrondissement of Lyon. This street is dedicated to Charlemagne, who came several times to Lyon. In addition, the bishop Leidrade represented the emperor in the city and by his great work of reconstruction. The Cours Charlemagne begins at the Place des Archives, just at the south of the vaults of the interchange of Perrache. It ends on the Quai Perrache, which overlooks the Pont Pasteur.

== History ==
The layout of the street was decided in 1806 (and published in 1826) to establish an imperial palace at the junction and link it to the Place Bellecour by a wide avenue. The street was eventually built between 1827 and 1832 and received its current name after the deliberation of the municipal council on 16 July 1830, later confirmed on 16 May 1837.

In the 19th century, French sculptor Jean-François Legendre-Héral and cartoonist Eugène-Coprais Boutin lived there. The northern part of the street was demolished in the 1850s to build the railway station of Perrache. Its extension was later approved by the City Council, on 24 October 1891.

Several industrial establishments were added southerly in 1907. Some buildings were demolished during the Second World War. On 8 July 1982, the gateway of Perrache station and the escalator connecting it to the Cours Charlemagne were inaugurated. Finally, in 2005, the arrival of the tram created many renovations.

== Description ==
This street is very broad (33 meters): it has two tramway T1, two bike lanes, two sidewalks and two communication routes. There are also two Velo'v stations.

There are all sorts of stores (food, restaurants, clothing, flower shops, record store ...), the Patinoire Charlemagne since 1969, the parish of St. Blandina, a billiard room, an association of linguistic trips, a gym and basketball club, several banks, etc. The street is currently bordered by a double row of plane trees.
