= Étienne Martellange =

16th and 17th-century French architect

- Born: 22 December 1569; Lyon, France
- Died: 3 October 1641 (aged 71); Paris, France
- Occupations: Architect and draftsman

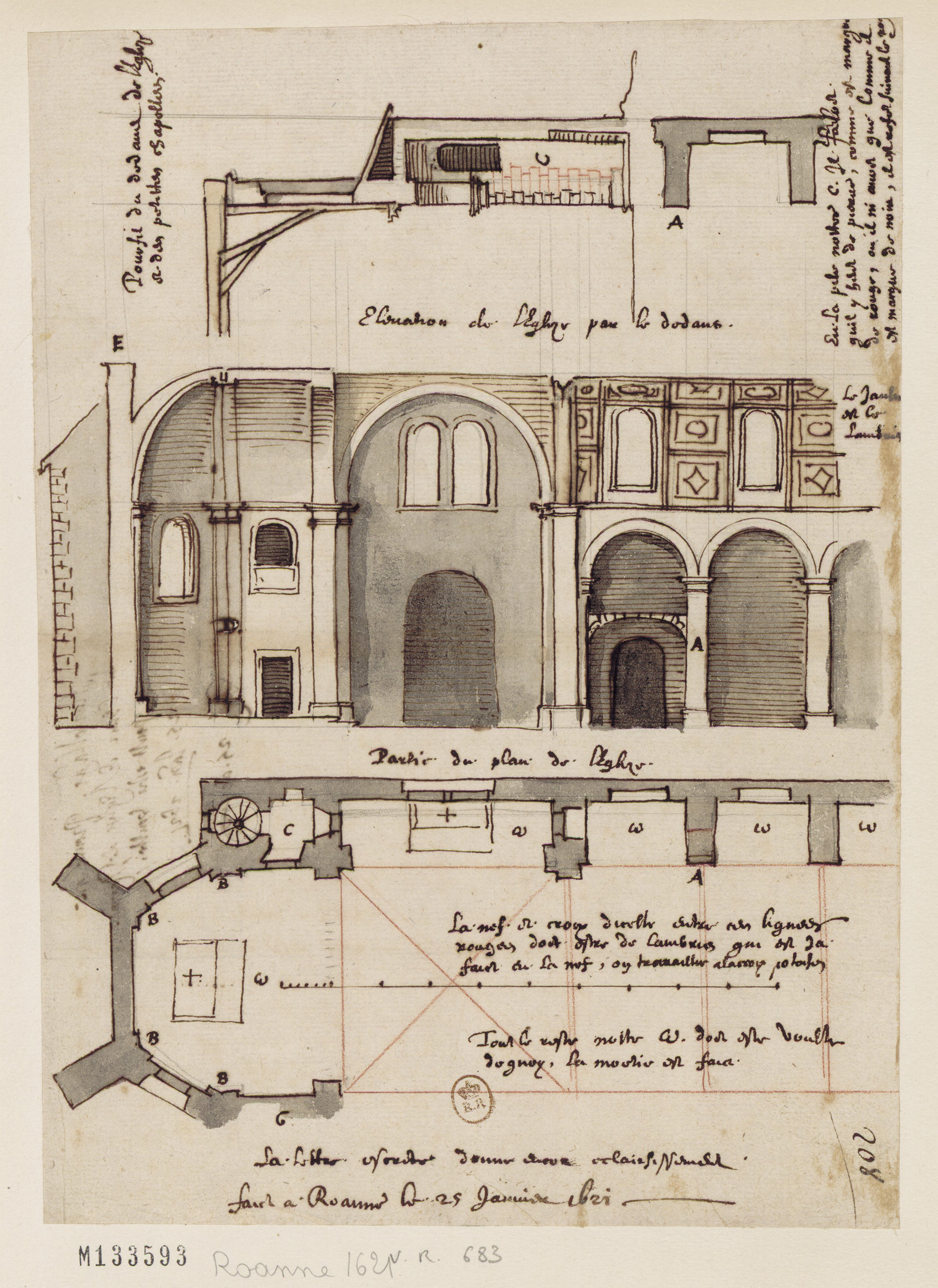
Architectural drawing of the church that formed part of the Jesuit school in Roanne. The church is now the Chapelle Saint-Michel.

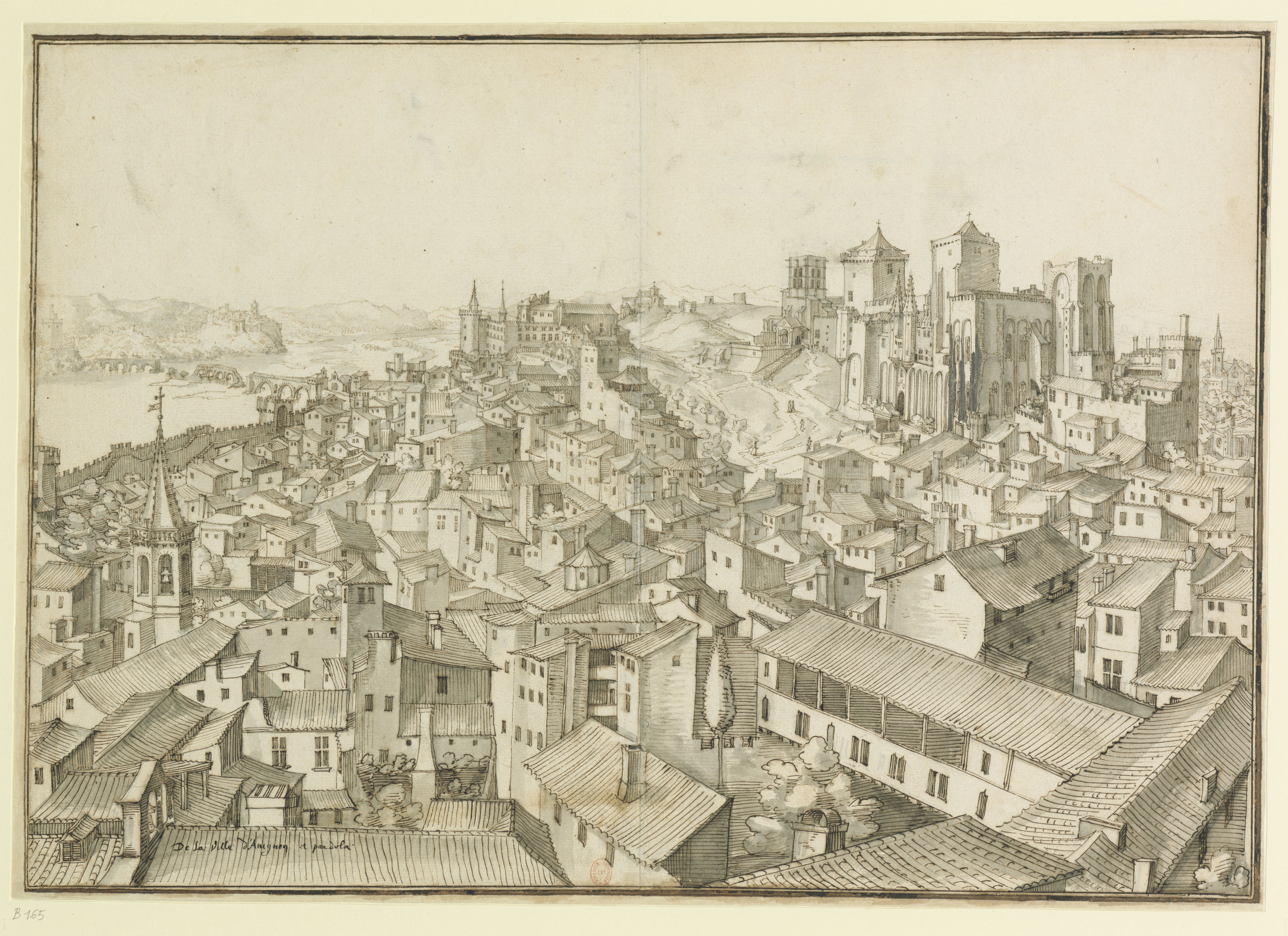
View of Avignon showing the Palais des Papes and the Pont Saint-Bénézet.

Étienne Martellange (22 December 1569 – 3 October 1641) was a French Jesuit architect and draftsman. He travelled widely in France as an architect for the Jesuit order and designed more than 25 buildings, mostly schools and their associated chapels or churches. His buildings reflect the Baroque style of the Counter-Reformation and include the Chapelle de la Trinité in Lyon and the church of Saint-Paul-Saint-Louis in Paris. In the course of his travels he made almost 200 detailed pen drawings depicting views of towns, buildings and monuments. These pictures have survived and provide an important historical record of French towns in the first third of the 17th century.

== Life ==
Martellange was born in Lyon on 22 December 1569. His father, also named Étienne Martellange, was a well-known painter in the town. Martellange had two brothers, Bernoît and Olivier, who both became Jesuits. Almost nothing is known about his early life. Although it was once believed that he may have spent some time in Rome, this is now considered unlikely. He joined the Jesuit order in Avignon on 24 February 1590, when he was 21, and became a "temporal coadjutor" in Chambéry on 29 March 1603. The first mention of Martellange as an architect is in 1603. Before this date he is listed as an artist.

The Jesuits had established themselves in France in the 1560s but were temporarily banned in 1595 after the attempted assassination of Henry IV by Jean Châtel. The edict of Rouen issued by the king in 1603 allowed the Jesuits to return and they then began a very active period of expansion. Beginning in 1604 Martellange travelled around France working as an architect and organising the construction of Jesuit schools and novitiates. For each building project he sent plans back to the Jesuit headquarters in Rome where they were scrutinized by the chief architect. Each project also had to be approved by the Superior General. Martellange also sent progress reports and estimates of the cost of the building work. Some of this correspondence has survived, including 65 plans and a number of letters. In the course of his travels Martellange also drew pictures of the local buildings and monuments. These very detailed pen drawings have been preserved and provide a valuable historical record.

In around 1637 he retired to the novitiate in Paris that he had himself designed. He died there on 3 October 1641.

The Bibliothèque nationale de France (French National Library) in Paris has a collection of 65 architectural drawings and 176 landscape drawings by Martellange. Ten letters by Martellange that originally accompanied the architectural drawings are now preserved in the National Library of Malta. The Ashmolean Museum in Oxford has a further 17 landscape drawings.

== Work as an architect ==
Martellange was involved in the design and construction of more than 25 Jesuit buildings in France. Most were schools with their associated chapels, but he also worked on novitiates (training colleges for Jesuits) in Lyon and Paris as well a professed house in Paris. He began in 1604 with the Jesuit school in Sisteron and for the first few years worked on projects in the region of Lyon but after 1610 he travelled more widely.

His surviving buildings include:

- Chapel of the Jesuit school in Le Puy-en-Velay, now the Église Saint-George or the Église du Collège.
- Collège des Godrans in Dijon, now the municipal library. Martellange probably only had a supervisory role.
- Collège de la Trinité in Lyon now part of the Collège-lycée Ampère. The Chapelle de la Trinité was consecrated in 1622. It has been restored and is now used as a venue for concerts and exhibitions.
- Collège in Roanne, now the Lycée Jean-Puy and the Chapel Saint-Michel. This school occupied Martellange between 1610 and 1621. The work is well documented; the Bibliothèque nationale has four plans and also five drawings recording the construction.
- Collège Sainte-Marie in Bourges, now part of the École nationale supérieure d'art.
- Collège Henri IV in the town of La Flèche, now part of the Prytanée National Militaire and its church of Saint-Louis.
- Chapel Saint-Thomas of the school in Rennes, now the Église Toussaints.
- Chapel Saint-Louis of the Jesuit school in Blois, now the Église Saint-Vincent-de-Paul.
- Chapel of the Jesuit school in Avignon, now the Musée Lapidaire. The museum houses part of the collection of the Fondation Calvet. Martellange produced the initial drawings and oversaw the start of the construction in 1620. Eight years later the project was taken over by the Avignon architect François de Royers de la Valfenière.
- Église Saint-Louis in Paris, now the Église Saint-Paul-Saint-Louis. This was a collaboration between Martellange who drew the initial plans and another Jesuit architect, François Derand, who was responsible for the design of the facade.

== Sources ==
- Bouchot, Henri (1886). "Notice sur la vie et les travaux d'Étienne Martellange, architecte des jésuites (1569–1641) d'après des documents inédits conservés au Cabinet des estampes de la Bibliothèque nationale". Bibliothèque de l'école des chartes (in French). 47: 17–52. doi:10.3406/bec.1886.447435.
- Charvet, E.-L.-G. (1874). Biographies d'architectes: Étienne Martellange (1569-1641) (in French). Lyons: Glairon-Mondet.
- Charvet, E.-L.-G. (1899). "Martellange (Etienne III)". Lyon artistique. Architectes : notices biographiques et bibliographiques avec une table des édifices et la liste chronologique des noms (in French). Lyon: Bernoux and Cumin. pp. 239–252.
- Moisy, Pierre (1950). "L'architecte François Derand, jésuite lorrain". Revue d'histoire de l'Église de France (in French). 36 (128): 149–167. doi:10.3406/rhef.1950.3095.
- Sénard, Adriana (2012). "Étienne Martellange: Un architecte de la Compagnie de Jésus en France au XVIIe siècle". In Zamora, María Isabel Alvaro; Fernández, Javier Ibáñez; Mainar, Jesús Fermín Criado (eds.). La arquitectura jesuítica Actas del Simposio Internacional Zaragoza, 9, 10 y 11 de diciembre de 2010 (PDF) (in French). Saragosse: Institución Fernando el Católico. pp. 213–237. ISBN 978-84-9911-158-2.
- Vingtain, Dominique; Aujard-Catot, Roland, eds. (2000). Avignon: Musées, Monuments, Promenades (in French). Paris: Éditions du patrimoine. ISBN 2-85822-555-9.
