= Chapelle de la Trinité =

Roman Catholic chapel in Lyon, France

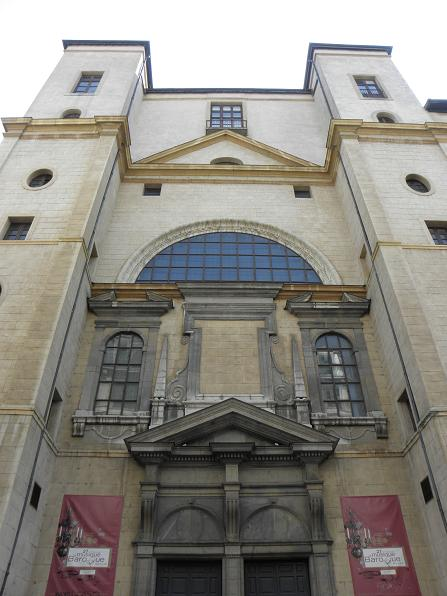
- Facade of the building

Religion
- Affiliation: Roman Catholic Church
- Diocese: 2nd arrondissement of Lyon

Location
- Location: Lyon, France
- Interactive map of Chapelle de la Trinité
- Coordinates: 45.7655°N 4.8372°E

Architecture
- Type: church
- Style: Baroque
- Completed: 1622

The Chapelle de la Trinité (French pronunciation: [ʃapɛl də la tʁinite]) is a Roman Catholic chapel located at 29-31 rue de la Bourse, in the 2nd arrondissement of Lyon, France. It is the first church in baroque style built in Lyon and is classified as historic monument.

== History ==
It is created by the architect Étienne Martellange, a Jesuit brother who introduced architectural models of the Counter-Reformation in Lyon. Built between 1617 and 1622, the chapel is located within the building of the Grand Collège, under the direction of the Jesuits since 1567. It was devoted to college students. It was consecrated in 1622 by Francis de Sales and was classified as monument historique in 1939, and was named "La Perle Baroque". However, it lost its furnitures throughout the time. The decor is very refined with coatings of Carrara marble.

Until September 1799, the chapel served as a barracks. In 1801, the First Consul was there proclaimed President of the Italian Republic.

Thomas Blanchet, Horace le Blanc, Magnan and Pierre David are the sculptors or painters whose works can be seen in the chapel. There are often patrimonial visits, haute couture shows, seminars and charity work in the chapel. About 30,000 people visit it each year.

In the 1990s, the City of Lyon, the Grand Lyon and the State decided to restore the chapel. It was illuminated by 12 chandeliers, similar to those of the seventeenth century.

== See also ==
- List of Jesuit sites
