= Église Saint-Bonaventure =

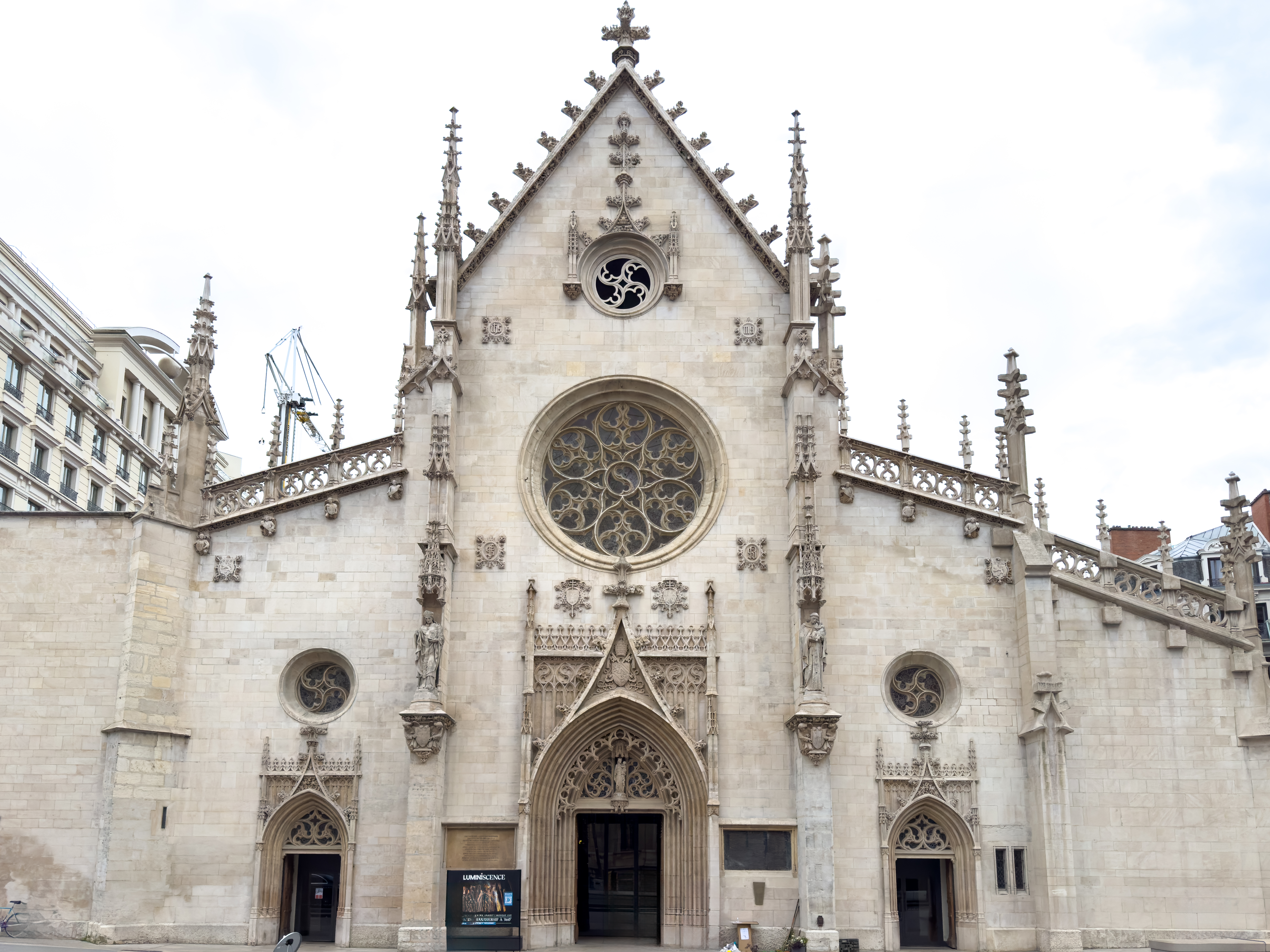
- Facade of the church

Religion
- Affiliation: Roman Catholic
- Diocese: 2nd arrondissement of Lyon

Location
- Location: Lyon, France
- Interactive map of Église Saint-Bonaventure
- Coordinates: 45.763144°N 4.836905°E

Architecture
- Type: Church
- Completed: late 1327

The Église Saint-Bonaventure (French pronunciation: [eɡliz sɛ̃ bɔnavɑ̃tyʁ]) is one of the churches of the quarter Presqu'île, located on the Place des Cordeliers, in the 2nd arrondissement of Lyon. This is the only medieval building not demolished after the creation of the rue Impériale (now rue de la République), under the Second Empire by the prefect Claude-Marius Vaïsse.

== History ==
The church's history, now known under the name of St. Bonaventure, is intimately related to the convent of the Cordeliers, for which it was constructed.

To meet the needs of the community of Franciscan friars, named Cordeliers, installed at this place since the seneschal Grolée bequeathed them a space for the installation of their convent, the construction of a bigger church was decided by Jacques de Grolée, grandson of the seneschal, to overcome the narrowness of the first convent church, which was apparent when the crowd was gathered at ceremonies for the Cardinal Bonaventure's death, on the night of 14 and 15 July 1274, at the age of 57.

The new church was oriented towards the south, which is rare at the time.

The church was built in just two years between 1325 and 1327. It housed the remains of Jacques de Grolée, died on 4 May 1327, which is under the high altar, before being moved somewhere near the epistle in 1599. The church was consecrated on 18 September 1328 by the archbishop of Lyon, Pierre IV of Savoy, under the name of St. Francis of Assisi.

Unlike the Église Saint-Nizier (Lyon), the church of Cordeliers became the seat of the brotherhoods. The church was expanded from 1471 to 1484 and was then named Saint-Bonaventure.

The choir was restored in 1607. It served as a granary after the French Revolution before being used to worship in 1806, getting its current facade under Cardinal Joseph Fesch's leadership.

It was returned to the Church in 1803 and renovated in 1838 by Claude-Anthelme Benedict, French architect.

Around 1890, the church was cleared of the curia and buildings beside it, which allowed the expansion of the rue Grolée on its western flank.

It was granted the honorary title of minor basilica by Pope Francis in response to a request from Cardinal Barbarin.

== Restoration ==
The Church underwent a comprehensive restoration from December 2021 to April 2023. The project, costing 750,000 euros, was a joint effort with 530,000 euros funded by the City of Lyon, 120,000 euros by the diocese, and 100,000 euros by the State through the regional cultural department. The restoration, handled by architect Renzo Wieder, focused on the main facade, stained glass windows, sculpted decor, and involved replacing metal clips and reconstructing sculptures as needed. This project adds to previous restoration work done in 2005 and 2017–2018.

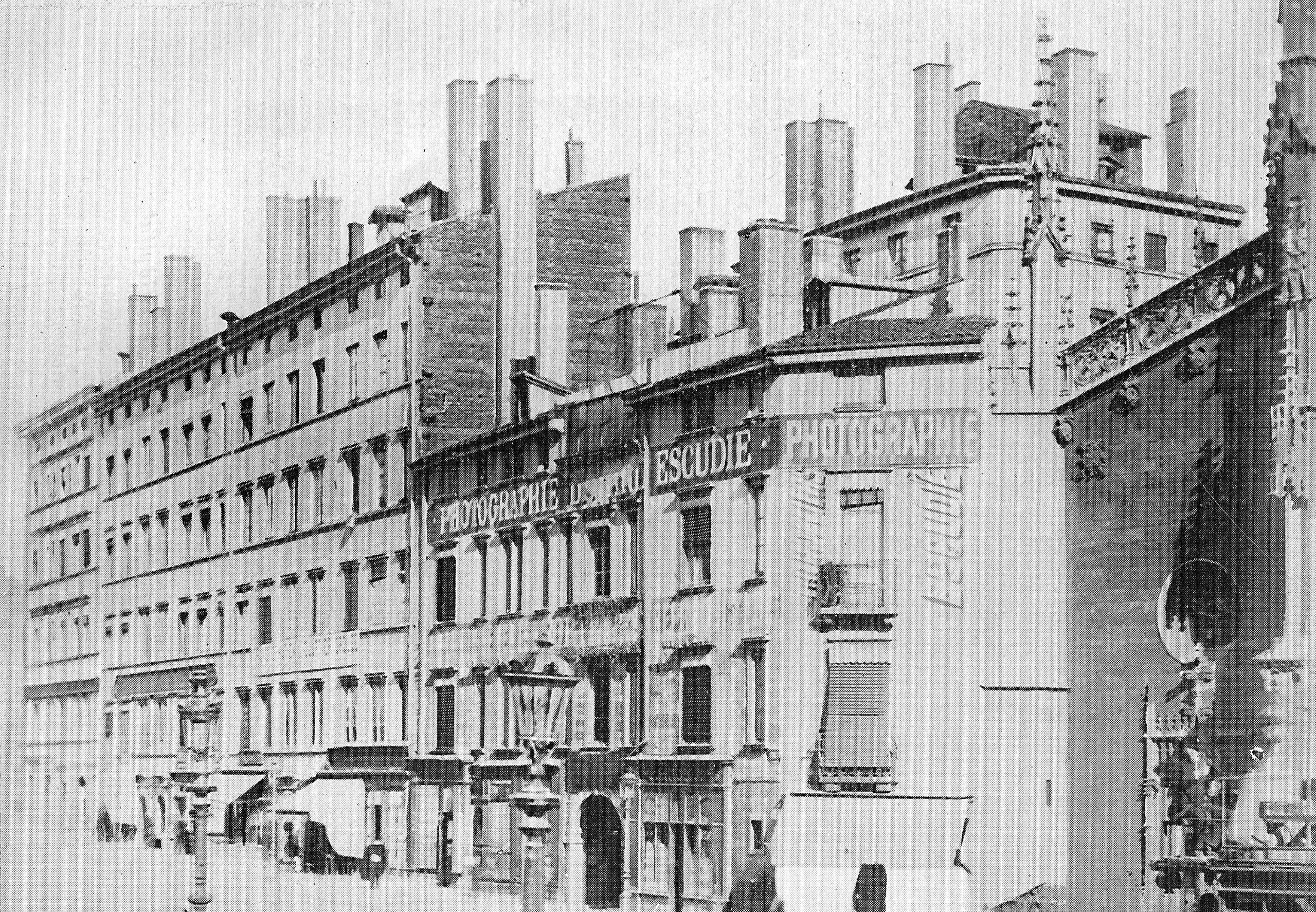
The houses on the eastern side of the church, before being demolished in 1890

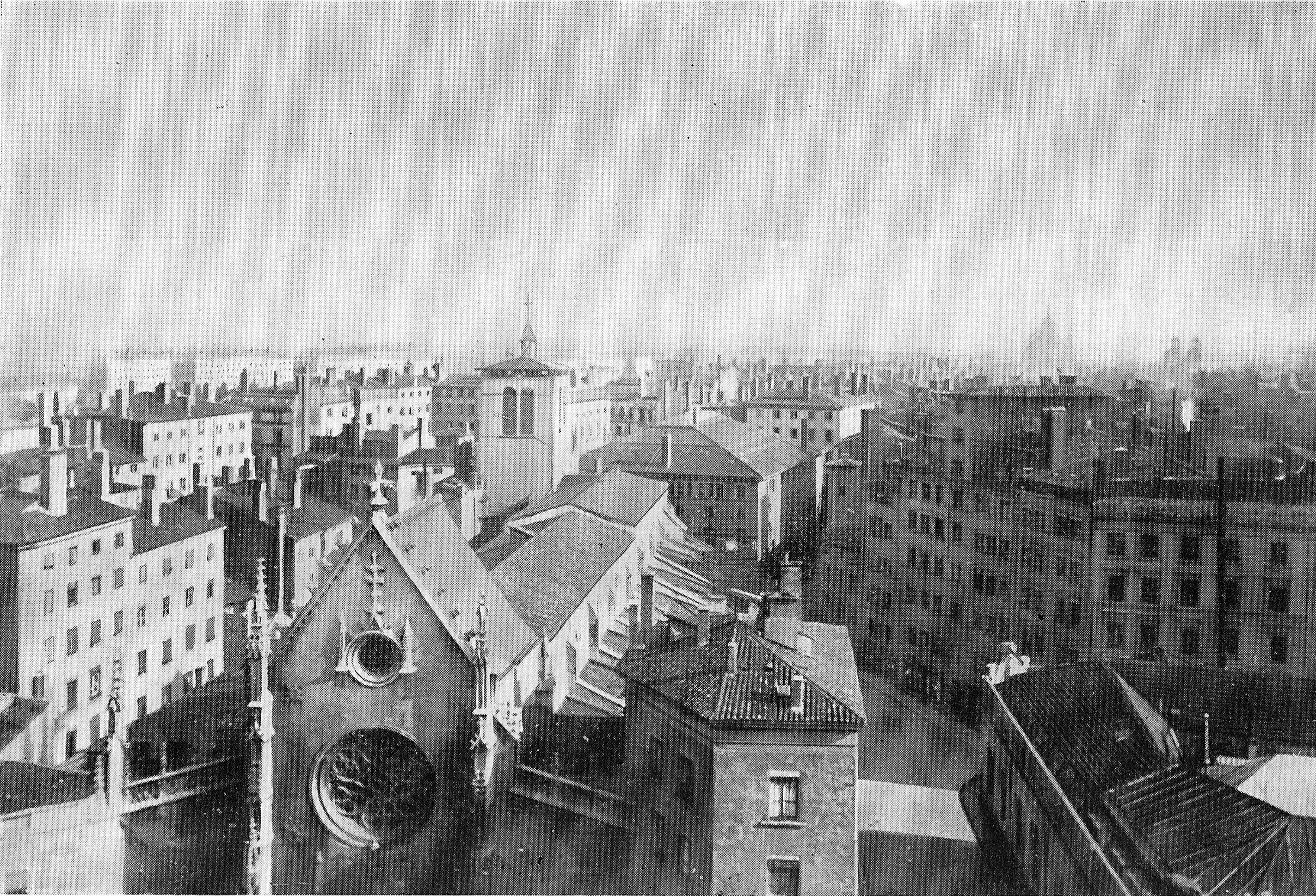
The quarter Grolée viewed from north, near 1890

== Chapels ==
In the monograph devoted to the whole convent of Cordeliers, the abbot Pavy did the same description as that of Fodéré.

- At the west (to the right), from the choir to the entrance :
  - Chapel n° 1 : chapel Notre-Dame, built by Jean Ogii (or Ogier), probably the same who was a member of the consulate. John Ogier and his family were buried in this chapel.
  - Chapel n° 2 : chapel of St. Fortuné (or saint Fortunat), by merchants of Troyes in Champagne in 1345
  - Chapel n° 3 : chapel St. Joseph, built by the brotherhood of the suits of clothes. It was dedicated to St. Jacques and St. Philip. Heraldry of the brotherhood can be seen on the arch of the arcade : scissors surmounted by a shell.
  - Chapelle n° 4 : chapel dedicated to St. Luc and St. Clair, by the painters and glaziers' brotherhoods. It is now the chapel of Sacred Heart whose altar was added by order of the Bishop of Neuville.
  - Chapel n° 5 : dedicated to St. Jean-Baptiste
  - Chapel n° 6 : chapel St. Anthony of Padua, built in 1388
  - Chapel n° 7 : ?
  - Chapel n° 8 : ?
  - Chapel n° 9 : ?
- At the east (to the left), from the choir to the entrance :
  - Chapelle n° 1 : first dedicated to Saint Francis of Assisi, then St. Bonaventure, it was dedicated to King St. Louis by the royal sergeants brotherhood.
  - Chapel n° 2 : chapel of the Assumption, dedicated to Notre-Dame. In 1662, it became Notre-Dame de la délivrance.
  - Chapel n° 3 : chapel St. Nicolas, built by the boatmen. In early 16th century, the troops led by François de Beaumont, baron des Adrets crossed the church during their looting and destroyed a part of the chapel. It was rebuilt in 1572.
  - Chapel n° 4 : chapel Notre-Dame de Grâce
  - Chapel n° 5 : chapel St. Bernardin, then St. Claude
  - Chapel n° 6 : ?
  - Chapel n° 7 : ?
  - Chapel n° 8 : ?
  - Chapel n° 9 : ?

== Scoutism ==
The church is an important part of the Scoutisme Français since it gathers together all Catholic movements of Scouting in Lyon. Every month, the church houses the inter-scout for its evening gathering and adoration prayer, organized by Eamus. The Friday before Palm Sunday, the evening gathering is hosted by the inter-scout choir of Lyon which also gives its annual concert on 8 December.

=== Galerie ===
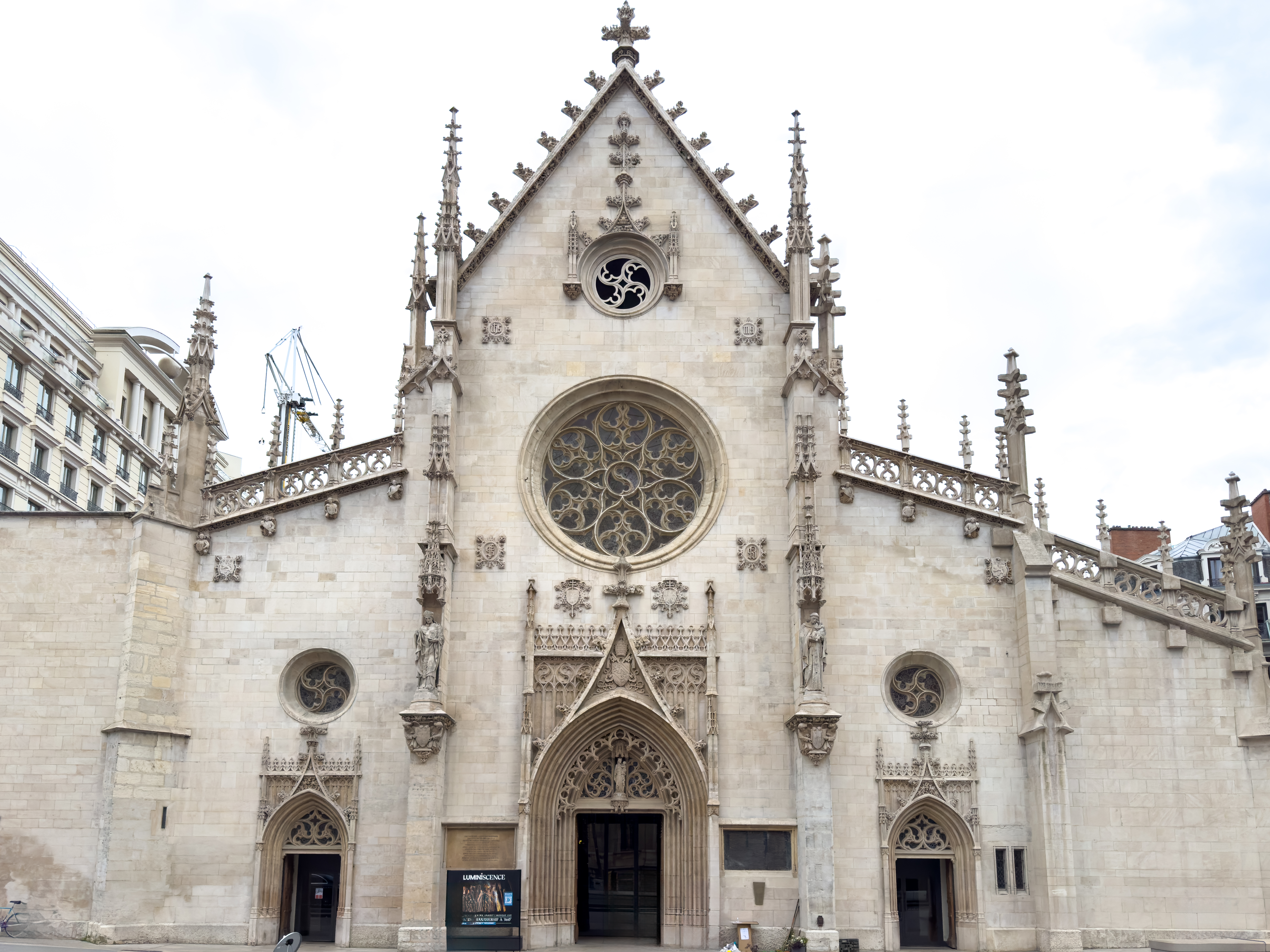

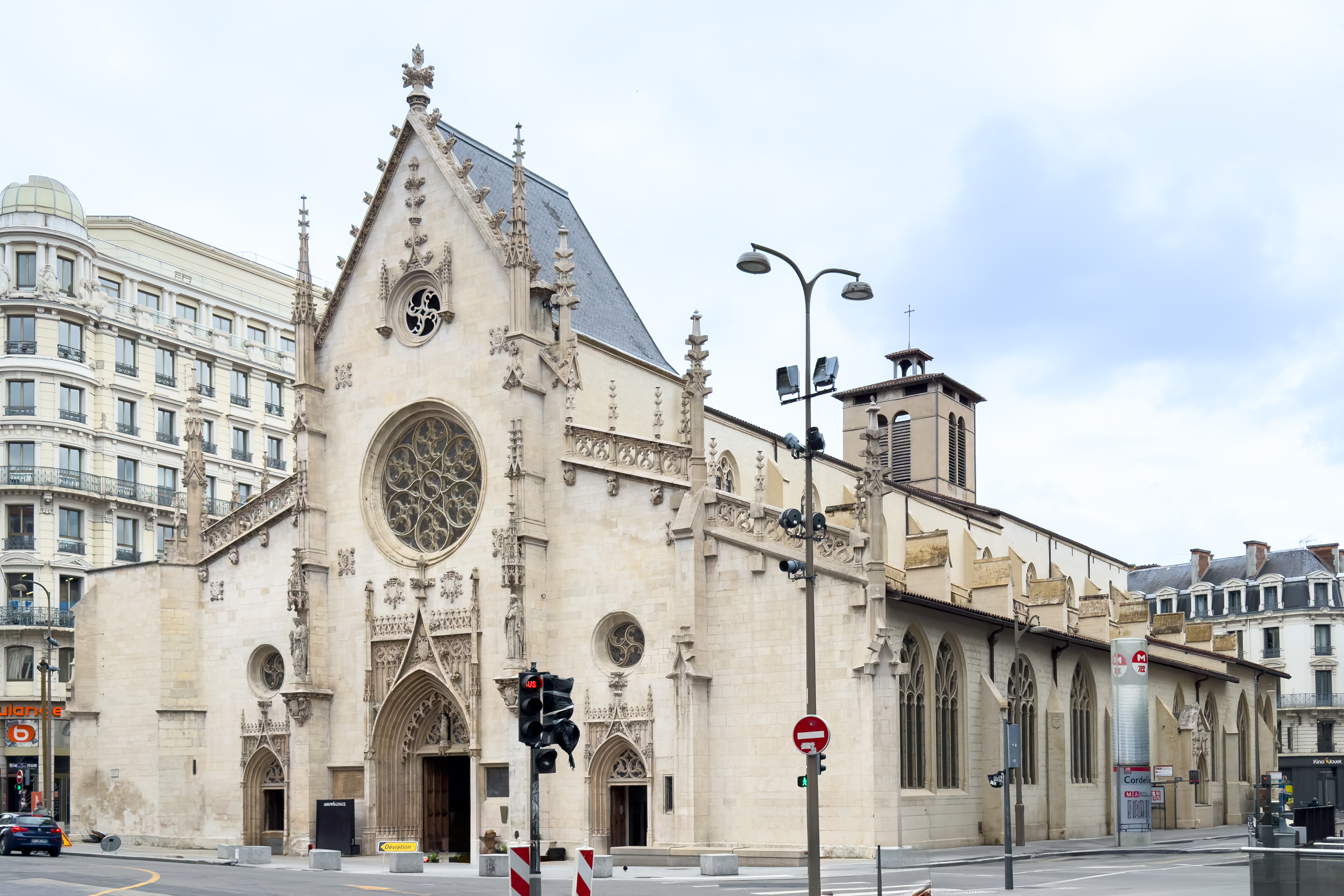

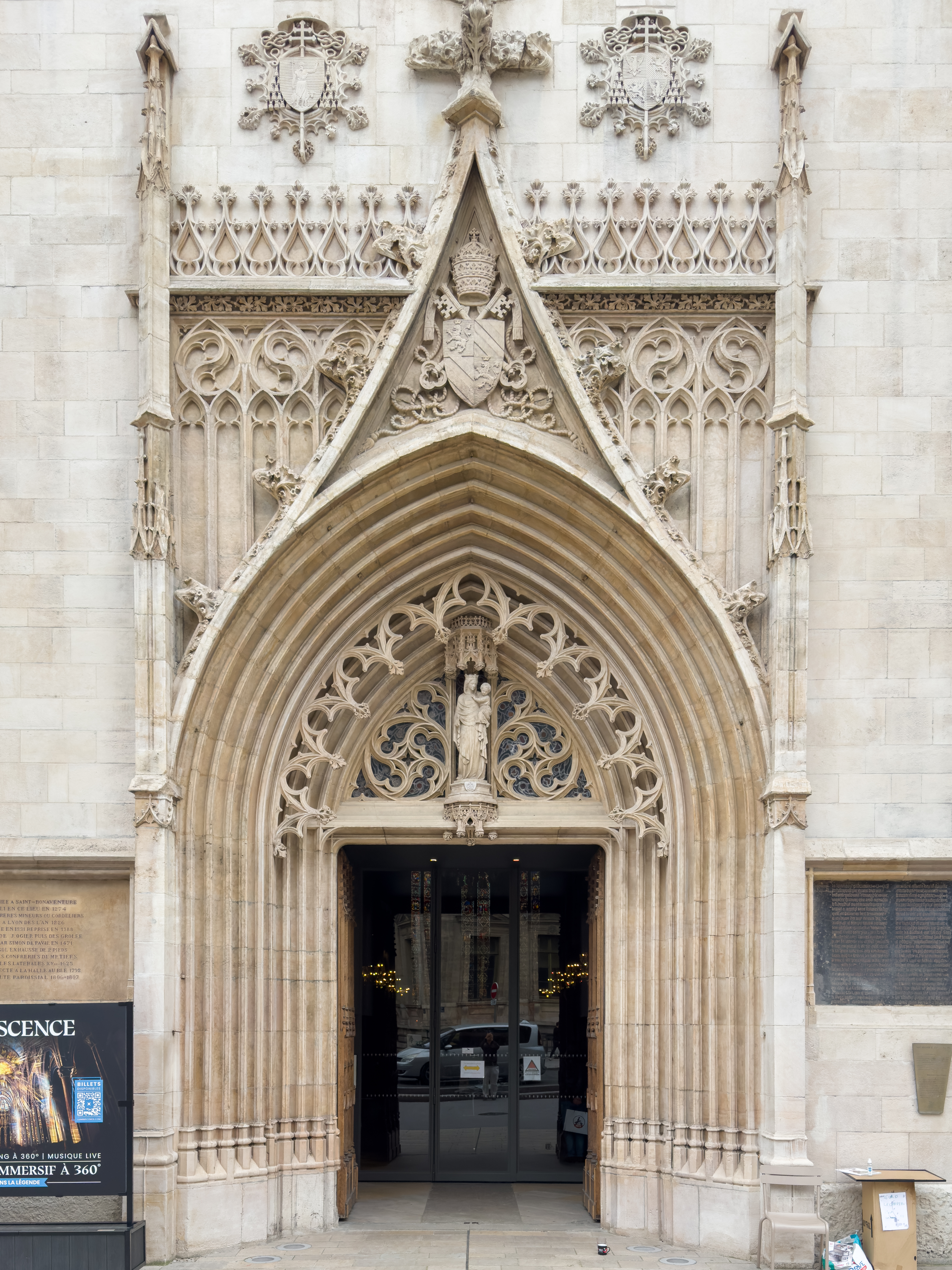

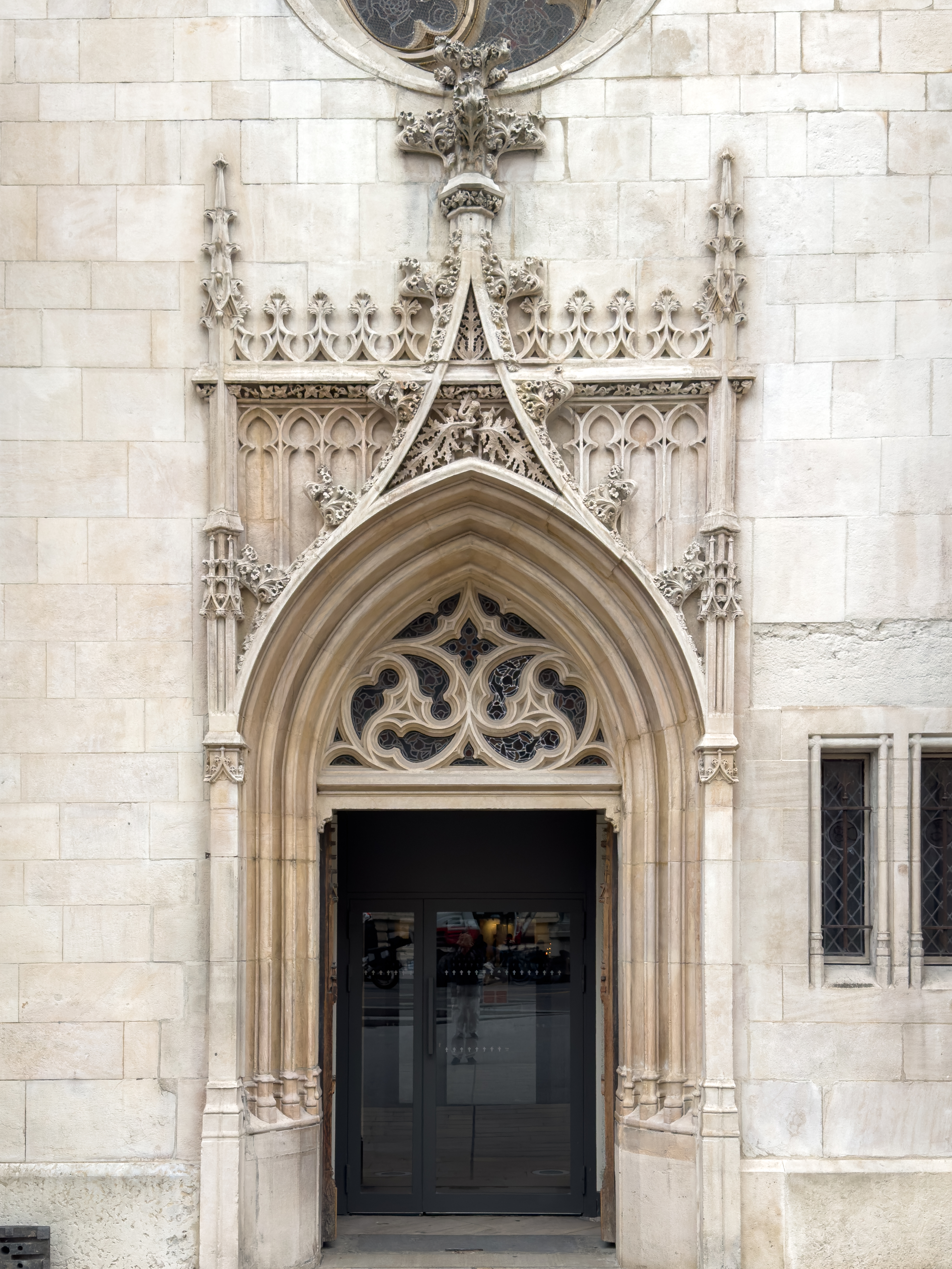

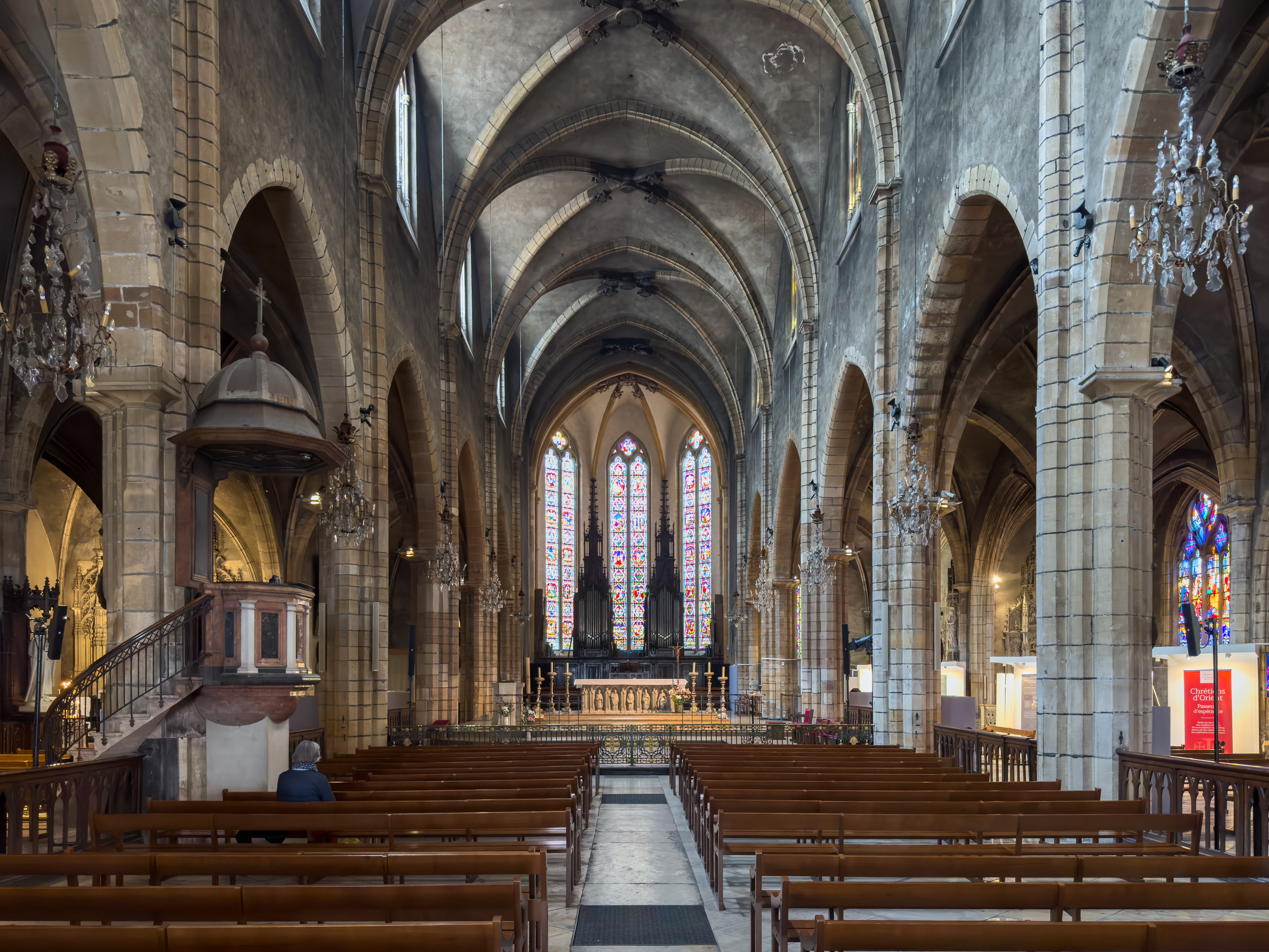

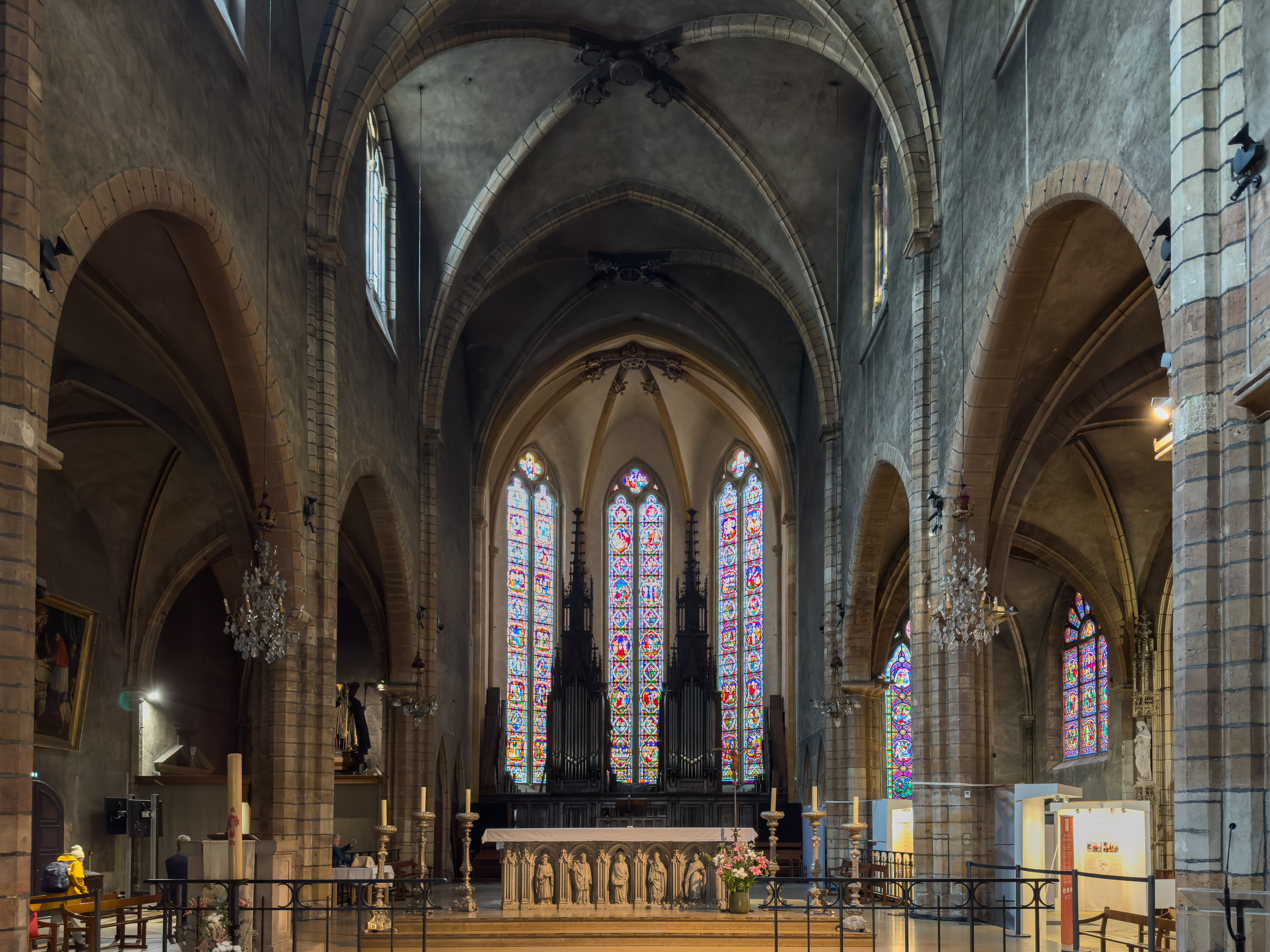

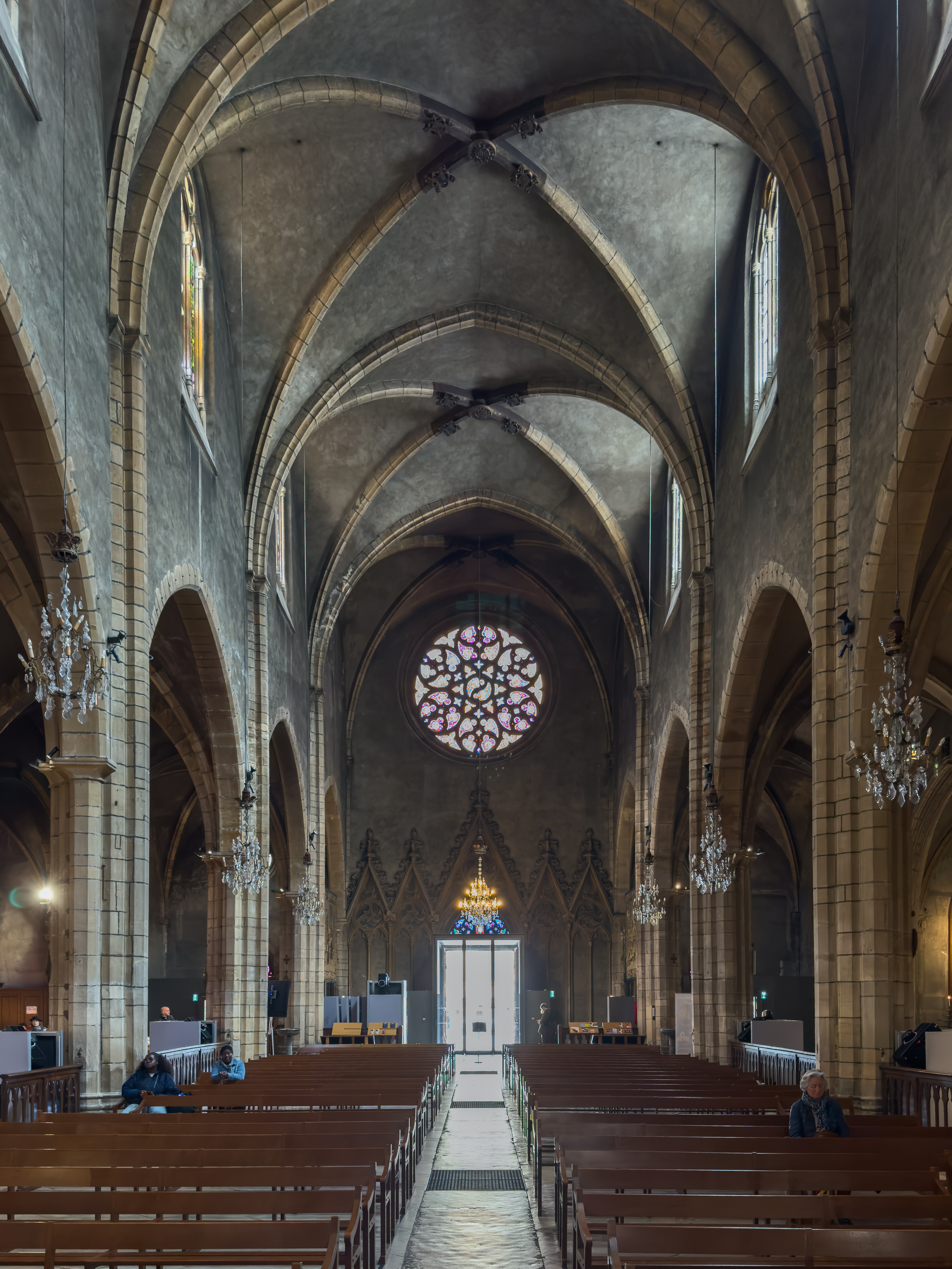

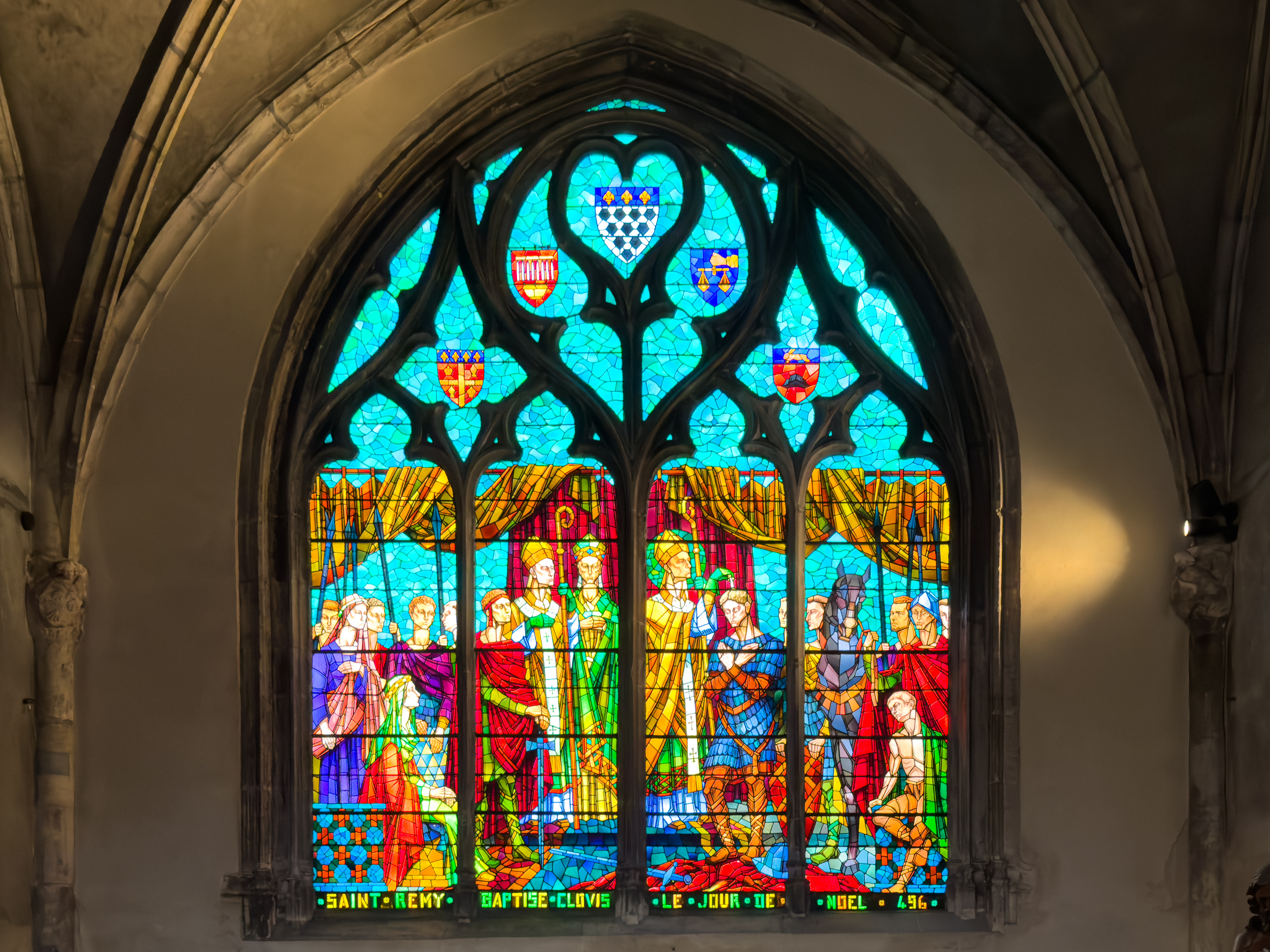
Stained glass: Saint Remigius baptizing Clovis I on 25 December 496
