= Denis-Simon de Marquemont =

French cleric

His Eminence Denis-Simon de Marquemont
- Cardinal, Archbishop of Lyon
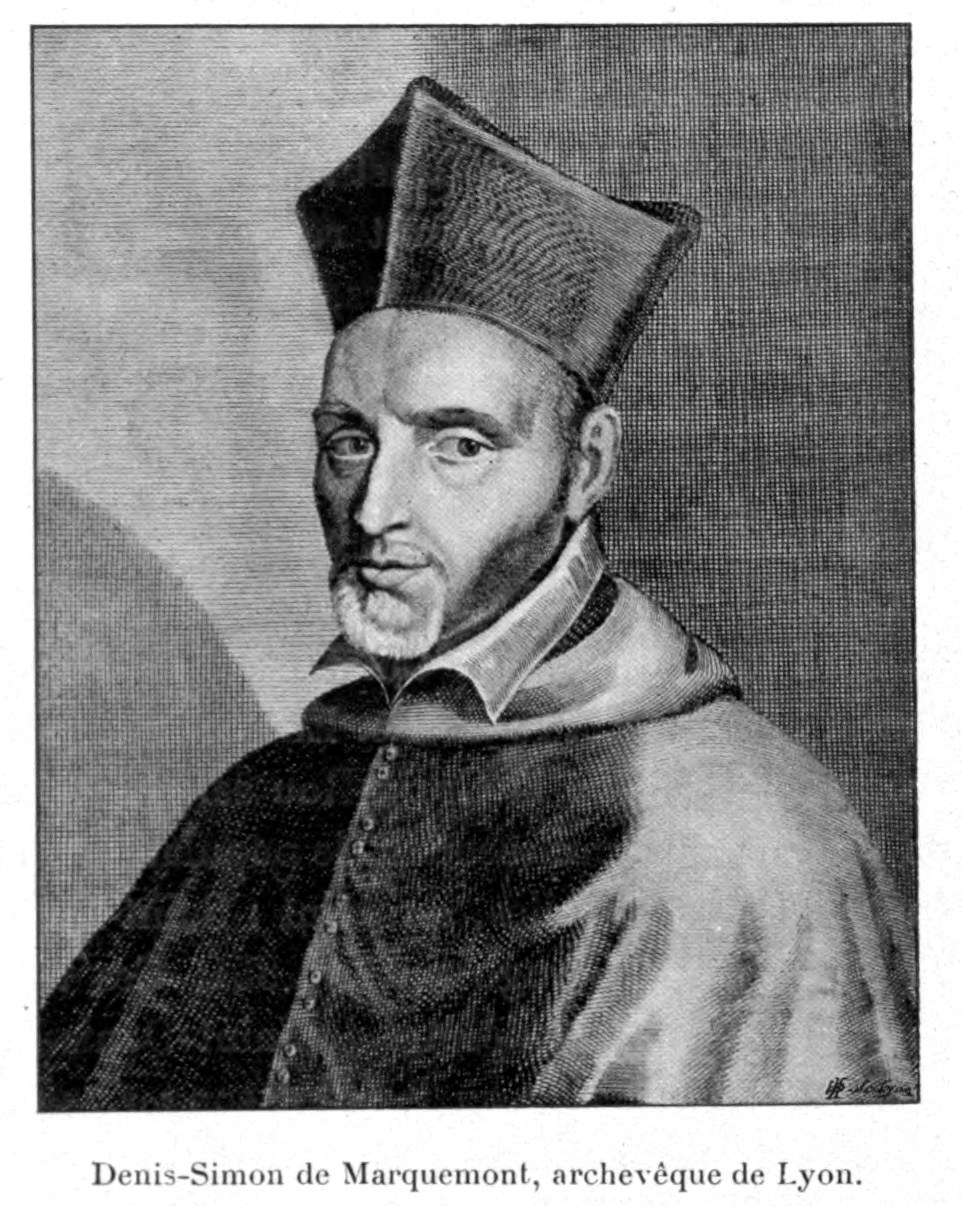
- Church: Roman Catholic
- Archdiocese: Lyon
- See: Cathedral of Saint John the Baptist of Lyon
- Installed: 11 November 1612
- Term ended: 16 September 1626
- Predecessor: Position vacant
- Successor: Alphonse-Louis du Plessis de Richelieu
- Other post: Cardinal-Priest of Santissima Trinita al Monte Pincio

Orders
- Ordination: December 1603
- Consecration: 11 November 1612 by François de La Rochefoucauld
- Created cardinal: 19 January 1626 by Urban VIII
- Rank: Cardinal-Priest

Personal details
- Born: 30 September 1572 Paris, France
- Died: 16 September 1626 (aged 53) Rome, Papal States
- Education: University of Paris; University of Angers

Denis-Simon de Marquemont (French pronunciation: [dəni simɔ̃ də maʁkəmɔ̃]; 30 September 1572 – 16 September 1626) was a French cleric who became Archbishop of Lyon in 1612.

== Early life ==
De Marquemont was born on 30 September 1572 in Paris, France, where his father worked in the secretariat of the King. He was educated at the University of Paris and the University of Angers and received a doctorate in utroque iure.

=== Diplomat ===
In 1594 he travelled to Rome as secretary to Jacques Davy Duperron, where with the help of Abbé Arnaud d'Ossat (1536–1604), later Cardinal d'Ossat (1599-1604), they obtained Henry IV's absolution from the status of relapsed heretic. When Duperron left Rome, de Maquemont remained behind, by order of King Henry, as counsellor to the French ambassador to the Holy See. At various times he was appointed acting ambassador and was so effective, the King determined that the regular ambassador should not make any significant decisions without de Marquemont's advice.

In 1600, he and Noël Brûlart de Sillery went to Florence to negotiate the marriage of Marie de' Medici to Henry IV of France.

In 1617, he was appointed by King Louis XIII charge d'affaires with Pope Paul V, pending the appointment of an ambassador. He returned to France two years later, but was again sent to Rome in 1622 as assistant to the ambassador.

=== Ecclesiastic career ===
He was ordained a priest in 1603 for the diocese of Paris at the age of 31 and in 1612 he was appointed Archbishop of Lyon.

In 1616, de Marquemont caused some controversy when he decreed that sisters of the Order of the Visitation of Holy Mary would no longer be allowed to live semi-cloistered lives but would instead be forced to "observe strict enclosure" like other female orders. This was despite his personal friendship with the order's founder, Francis de Sales.

Also in 1616, priests of Bérulle's Oratory of Jesus moved to the Choir school; and the Carmel of Lyon was founded by Mère Marie de Jésus on the hill of La Croix-Rousse.

De Marquemont was elevated to cardinal on 19 January 1626 and was appointed Cardinal-Priest of the Church of Trinità dei Monti the following month. He died on 16 September of that year.
