= Collège-lycée Ampère =

Coordinates: 45°45′55″N 4°50′15″E

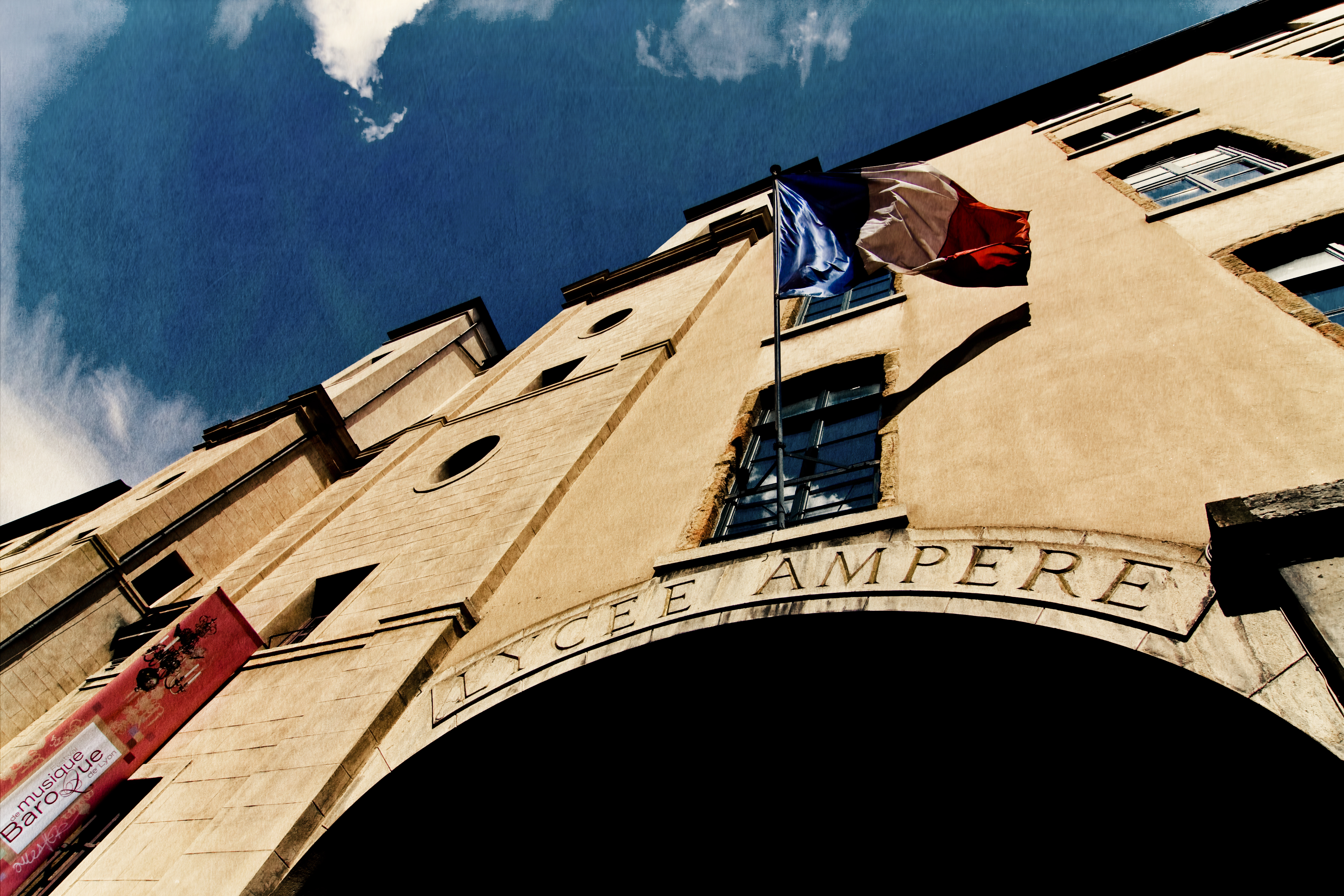

Location
- 31 rue de la Bourse, 69002 Lyon, France

Information
- Type: Public
- Founded: Building, 1519; Namesake, 1888
- School district: 2nd arrondissement of Lyon
- Principal: Anne-Marie BRUGEAS
- Enrollment: 1186
- Website: www.lyceeampere-lyon.fr

The Collège-lycée Ampère (French pronunciation: [kɔlɛʒ lise ɑ̃pɛʁ]) is a school located in the 2nd arrondissement of Lyon.

== History ==
The school was founded in 1519 by members of the Brotherhood of the Trinity. It was then known as Collège de la Trinité. Under this name it was directed by the Jesuits from 1565 to 1762, then by the Oratorians until 1792.

During the French Revolution, the building was occupied by the troops of the National Convention and renamed École centrale. Napoléon Bonaparte, then First Consul, was proclaimed President of the Italian Republic during a gathering called the 'consulte de Lyon' in the high chapel of the school and with a consular order of vendémiaire 24 year XI (16 October 1802), the property was transformed into Lycée impérial. Under the Restoration, it was renamed Collège royal, until the French Revolution of 1848, when it became the Lycée de Lyon.

In 1888, it was named Lycée Ampère after physician André-Marie Ampère. It later became the first mixed college in France.

== Chapel of the Trinity ==
26 January 1802, the Consulte de la République cisalpine, by Nicolas-André Monsiau, 1806-08.

The chapel of the Trinity also called 'high chapel' was built in the College-lycée Ampère between 1617 and 1622 in the baroque style and the first stone was blessed by archbishop Denis-Simon de Marquemont. In 1754, it was refurbished by the Lyon architect planner Jean-Antoine Morand. Classified monument historique in 1939, it was neglected and even served as the gym. Restored in the 1990s, it now hosts regular classical music concerts.

== See also ==
- Catholic Church in France
- Education in France
- List of Jesuit schools
