= Birdy Kids =

French artist collective

Birdy Kids is a France-based street-art artist collective.

== Career ==
Birdy Kids was created in 1989, in Lyon, France. As of 2014, it had three members: Gauthier, Stéphane and Guillaume.

The first graffiti that the collective made featured a bird (now known as "Birdy") along some of the ring roads of the Lyon area. Although it was first thought of as a degradation of public space, Birdy is now a symbol for the city, which explains why the graffiti remain untouched by the graffiti removal services.

Since 2000, Birdy Kids have participated in several events promoting street art in other cities, including Paris and Barcelona.

In 2012, Birdy Kids was chosen to be the cultural ambassador of Lyon.

== Gallery ==
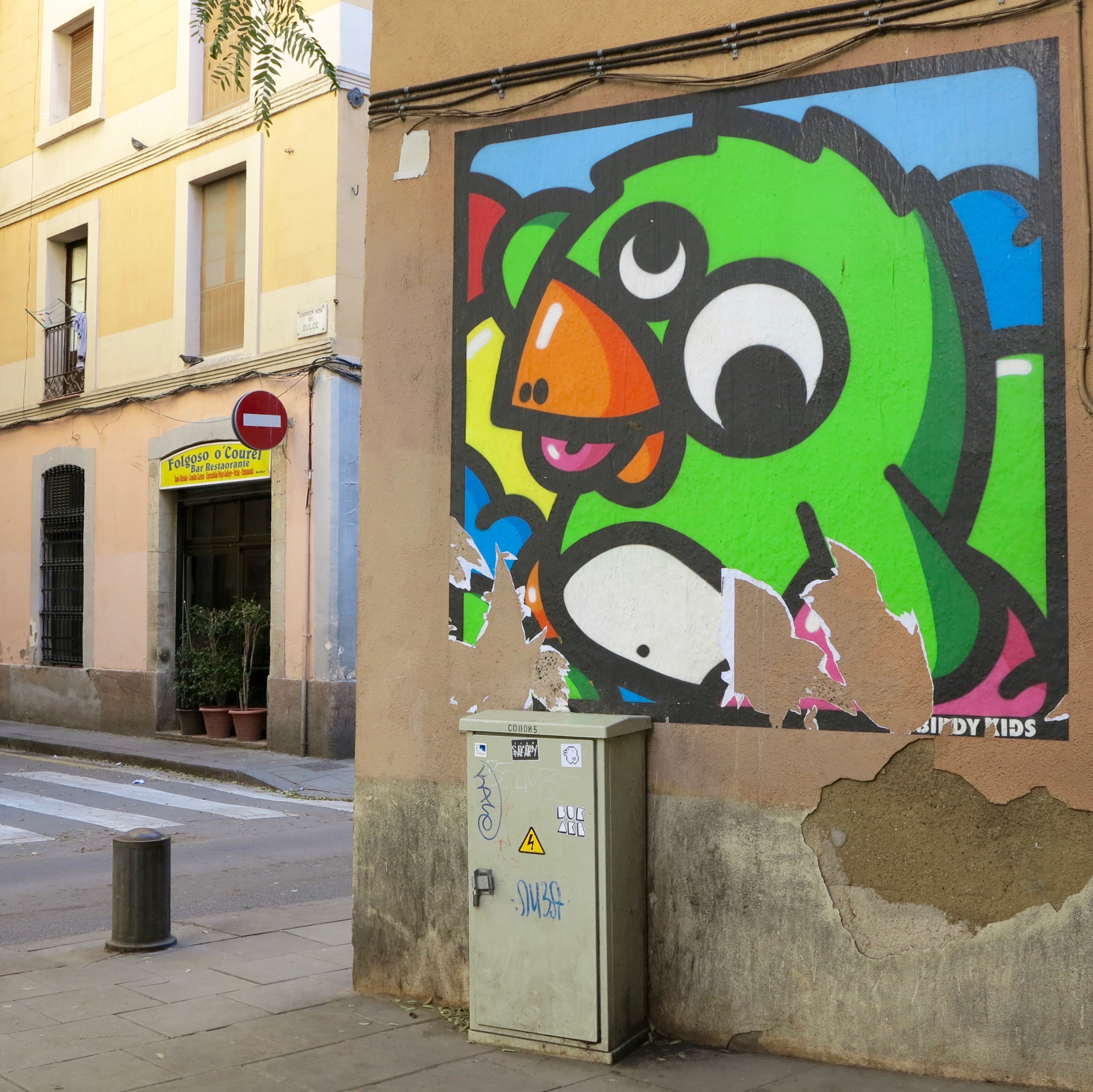

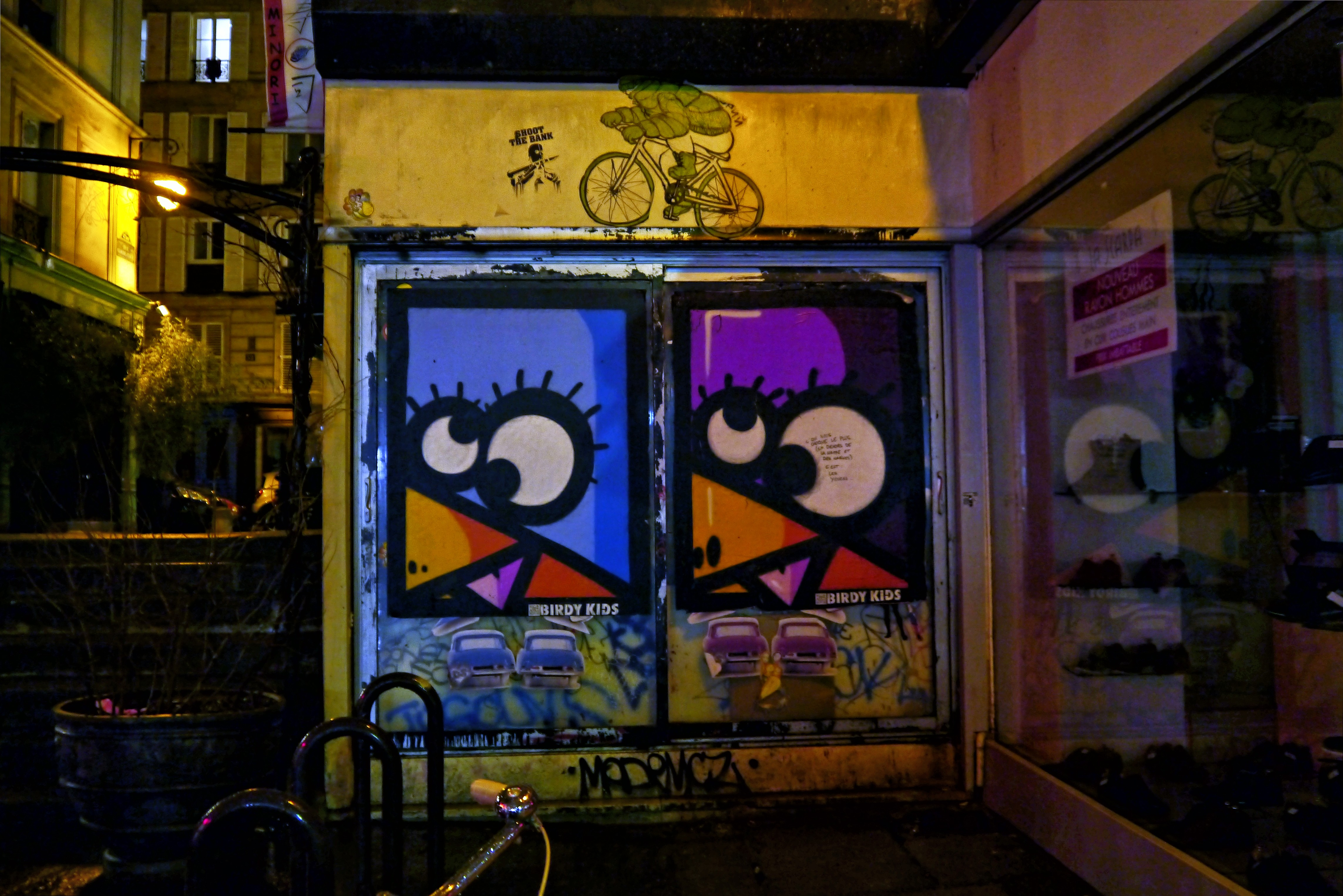

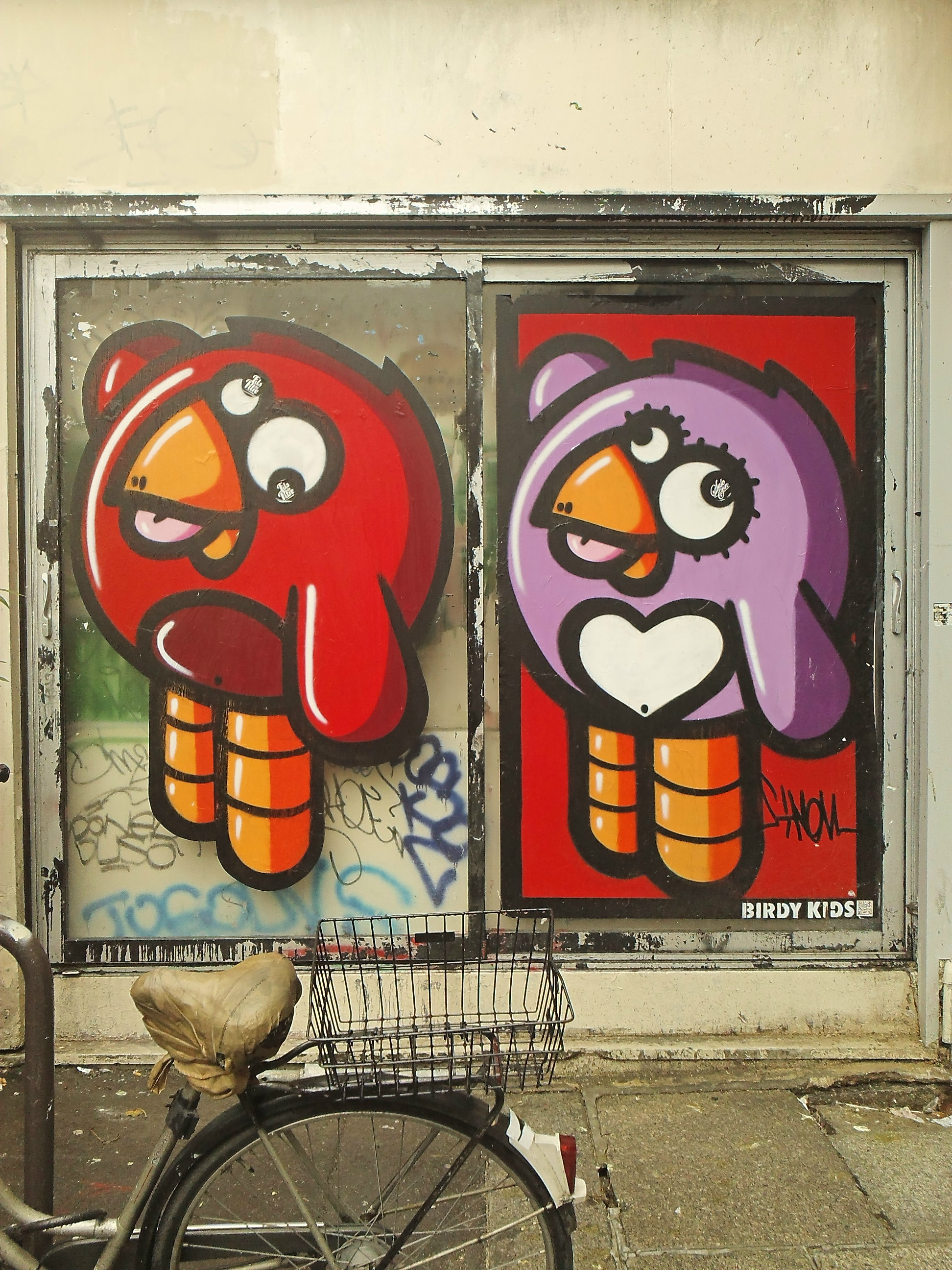

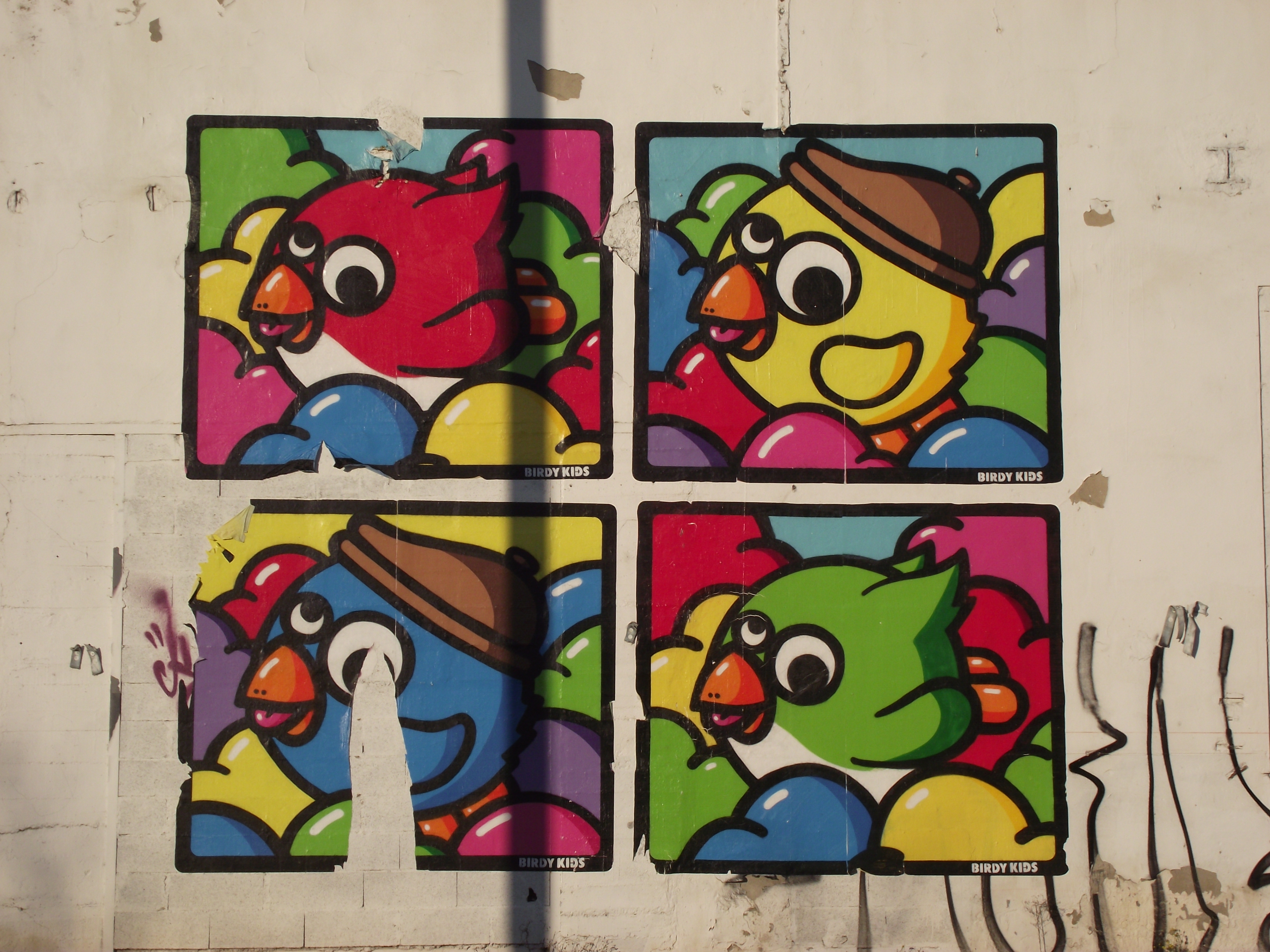

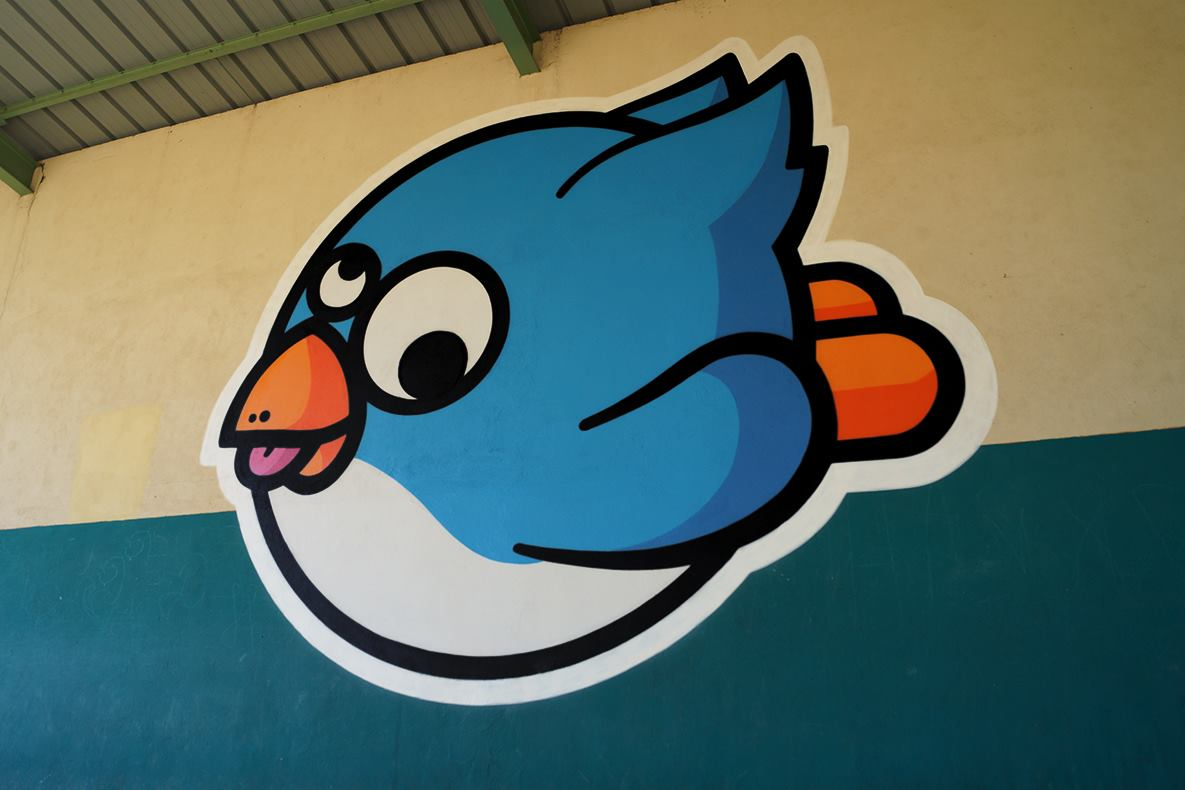

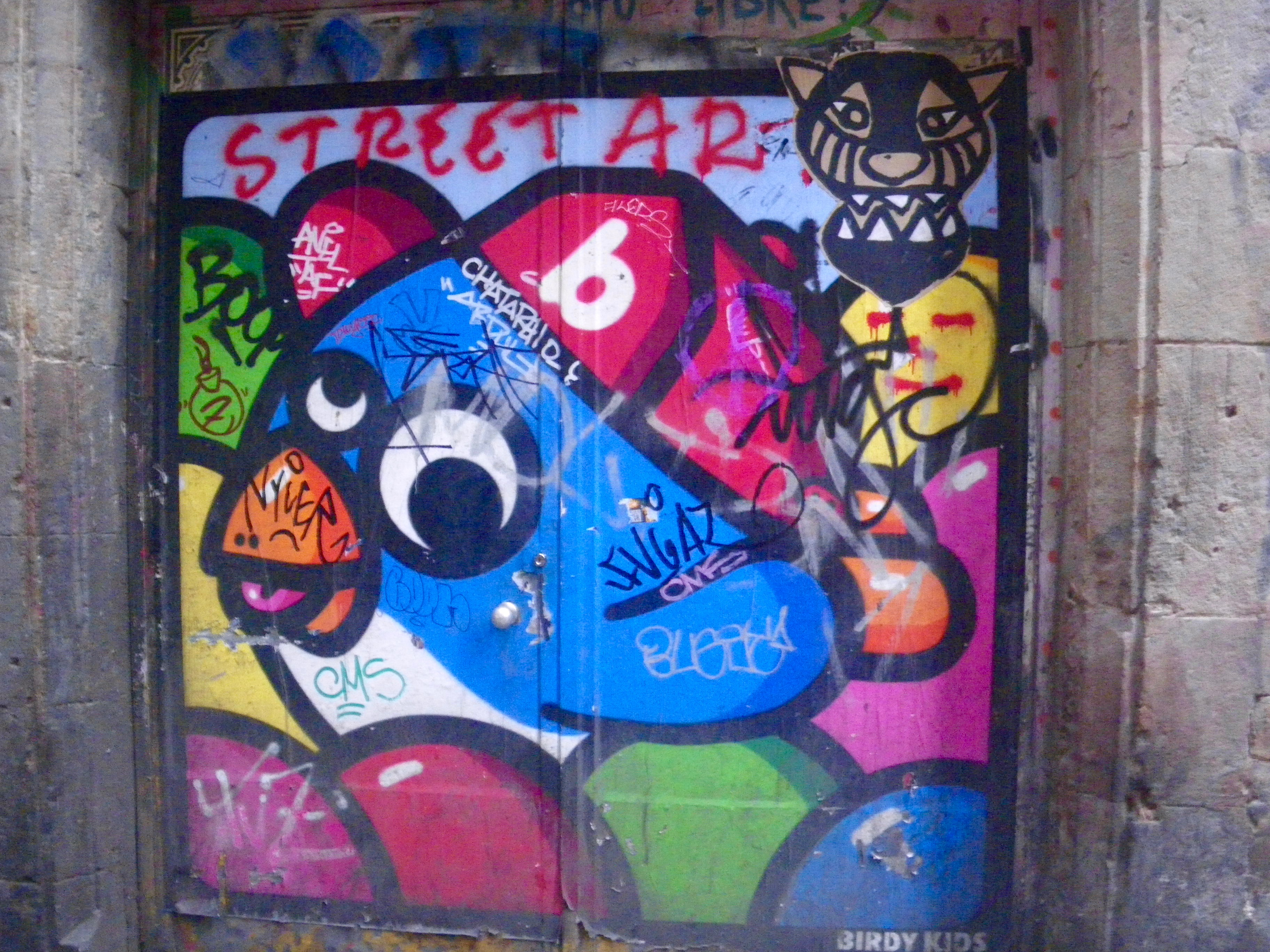
In Barcelona

== See also ==
- Street art
