= List of theatres and entertainment venues in Lyon =

Theatres and entertainment venues in Lyon, France includes present-day opera houses and theatres, cabarets, music halls and other places of live entertainment.

The list is by name in alphabetical order, but it can be resorted by address, arrondissement, opening date (of the building, not the performing company), number of seats (main + secondary stage), or main present-day function. It excludes theatrical companies, outdoor venues, churches in which concerts are performed, museums and libraries. Former names of the theatre (again the building, not the performing company) are included in the notes.

Name	Address	Arrt	Opened	Seats	Present use	Photo	Notes
A Thou Bout d'Chant	2 rue de Thou	1st	2001		concerts		
Acte 2 Théâtre	32 bis Quai Arloing	9th		104	theatre (plays), dance, exhibitions		
Auditorium Maurice-Ravel	149 rue Garibaldi	3rd	1975	2,120	concerts		Built by Charles Delfante and Henri Pottier
De l'Autre Côté du Pont	25 Cours Gambetta	3rd			general, jazz, exhibitions...		
Le Bec de Jazz	19 rue Burdeau	1st			jazz		
Bourse du Travail	205 Place Guichard	3rd	1891	1,950	general		
Carré 30	12 rue Pizay	2nd		30	theatre (plays)		Smaller theatre in Lyon
Ciné Duchère	Avenue Andrei Sakharov	9th			cinema		
Ciné Saint-Denis	77 Grande Rue de la Croix Rousse	4th			cinema		
Le Cinéma	Impasse St Polycarpe	1st			cinema		
Cinéma Opéra	6 rue Joseph Serlin	1st			cinema		
La Cléf de Voûte	1 Place Chardonnet	1st			jazz		
CNP Bellecour	12 rue de la Barre	2nd			cinema		
CNP Terreaux	40 rue Édouard-Herriot	1st			cinema		
Le Comœdia	13 avenue Berthelot	7th	~ 1915	900+	cinema		
Le Complexe du Rire	7 rue des Capucins	1st			theatre (plays), humor		
Le Croiseur	4 rue Croix Barret	7th	2007		theatre (plays), dance		
Espace 44	44 rue Burdeau	1st	1986	40	theatre (plays)		
Le Fou	2 rue Fernand Rey	1st	2007		theatre (plays)		Formerly Le Fou fieffé
Halle Tony Garnier	20 Place Docteurs Charles et Christophe Mérieux	7th	1988	17,000	concerts, exhibitions		Built in 1914 by Tony Garnier; Classified as monument historique
Hot Club	26 rue Lanterne	1st			jazz		
Institut Lumière	25 rue du Premier Film	8th	1998	269	cinema		
Maison de la danse	8 avenue Jean Mermoz	8th	1992	1,140	dance		Built by Pierre Bourdeix; Formerly Théâtre du 8e
Le Marché Gare	34-36 rue Casimir Perrier	2nd			concerts		
Le Ninkasi	267 rue Marcel Mérieux	7th		600	concerts		
Nouveau Théâtre du 8e (NTH8)	22 rue commandant Pégout	8th			theatre (plays)		
Opéra de Lyon (Opera Nouvel)	1 Place de la Comédie	1st	1831	1,100	dance, operas, concerts		First built by Jacques-Germain Soufflot as Grand Théâtre; Rebuilt by Jean Nouvel in 1993
Le Périscope	13 rue Delandine	2nd			concerts, jazz, general		
Le Petit Théâtre de Poche	17 rue Juiverie	5th		32	theatre (plays)		
La Plateforme	4 Quai Victor Augagneur	3rd	2005		concerts, shows		Formerly La Perousse
Salle Léo Ferré	5 Place Saint Jean	5th	1984		theatre (plays)		
Salle Molière	18 Quai de Bondy	5th	1902–04		concerts		Built by Eugène Huguet
Salle Rameau	29 rue de la Martinière	1st	1908	965	concerts		Built by François Clermont
Salle des Rancy	249 rue de Vendôme	3rd		100	theatre (plays)		
Le 6e Continent	51 rue Saint-Michel	7th			general		
Studio Club	29 cours d'Herbouville	4th	2006		jazz		
Les Subsistances	8 bis Quai Saint Vincent	2nd	~ 1995		general		
Théâtre de l'Anagramme	27 rue Royale	1st			general		
Théâtre des Asphodèles	17 Bis Impasse Saint Eusèbe	3rd	1999		theatre (plays)		
Théâtre des Ateliers	5 Rue du Petit David	2nd	1976	220 / 100	theatre (plays)		
Théâtre des Célestins	4 rue Charles Dullin	2nd	1877	792 / 175	theatre (plays)		Built by Gaspard André; Classified as monument historique
Théâtre des Clochards Célestes	51 rue des Tables Claudiennes	1st			theatre (plays), danse, exhibitions		
Théâtre de la Croix-Rousse	Place Joannès Ambre	4th	1931	594	theatre (plays)		
Théâtre de l'Élysée	14 rue Basse Combalot	7th			theatre (plays)		
Théâtre Étoile Royale	17 rue Royale	1st		50	theatre (plays)		
Théâtre Le Guignol	2 rue Louis Carrand	5th	1966		theatre for children		
Théâtre Instant T	35 rue Imbert Colomès	4th	2004		theatre (plays)		
Théâtre de l'Intervalle	21 rue Royale	1st			theatre (plays)		
Théâtre de Lulu	60 rue Victor Lagrange	7th		200	theatre (plays)		
Théâtre de Lune	Passage Mermet	1st			theatre (courses)		
Théâtre des Marronniers	7 rue des Marronniers	2nd	1985	50	theatre (plays)		
Théâtre du Point du Jour	7 rue des Aqueducs	5th		340	theatre (plays)		
Théâtre Nouvelle Génération	23 rue de Bourgogne	9th	2004		theatre (plays)		Built by Michel Roux-Spitz; Formerly Théâtre des Jeunes Années
Théâtre Tête d'Or	60 avenue de Saxe	3rd	2001	371	general		
Villa Gillet	25 rue Chazière	4th	1987		readings		Built in 1911–13 by Joseph Folléa

== External links and references ==
- (in French) culture.lyon.fr, the cultural portal of the City of Lyon
- (in French) evene.fr, database
