= Rue des Capucins =

Street in the 1st arrondissement of Lyon, France

Coordinates: 45°46′09″N 4°49′59″E

Rue Des Capucins
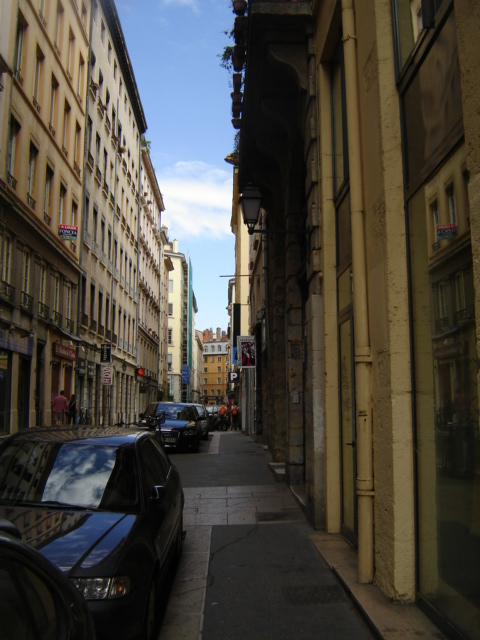
- The street, just after the Place des Capucins
- Type: Street
- Location: 1st arrondissement of Lyon, Lyon, France
- Postal code: 69001

Construction
- Completion: first part of the 19th century

The Rue des Capucins (French pronunciation: [ʁy de kapysɛ̃]) is a street located in the 1st arrondissement of Lyon, between the slopes of La Croix-Rousse and the Place des Terreaux. Straight but slightly inclined, it continues the Rue du Sergent Blandan, begins with the Place des Capucins and ends on the Place Croix-Paquet. It is parallel to the Rue René Laynaud. The street belongs to the zone classified World Heritage Site by UNESCO.

== History ==
In its eastern part, the street replaces the old Rue Vannerot established in the 17th century, dedicated to Jean Vannerot and which changed of name in 1850. The western part of the Rue des Capucines was opened in the mid-19th century on the former site of the garden owned by monks, and a small square called the Place des Capucins was open in the 18th century.

The monastery of the Capuchin order, named Capucins du Petit Forez, was built in 1622 at the current location of the No. 6 and their church, the chapel of Saint-André, was located at the foot of the montée de la Grande Côte. Their home was purchased and rebuilt by a banker, André Coste. Anne of Austria attended the start of construction of the building which was dedicated on 25 April 1635 by Jean de Nuchèse. Finally, the Capuchins were expelled from the street during the French Revolution. In 1810, the street was named Grande Rue Neuve des Capucins.

== Architecture and associations ==
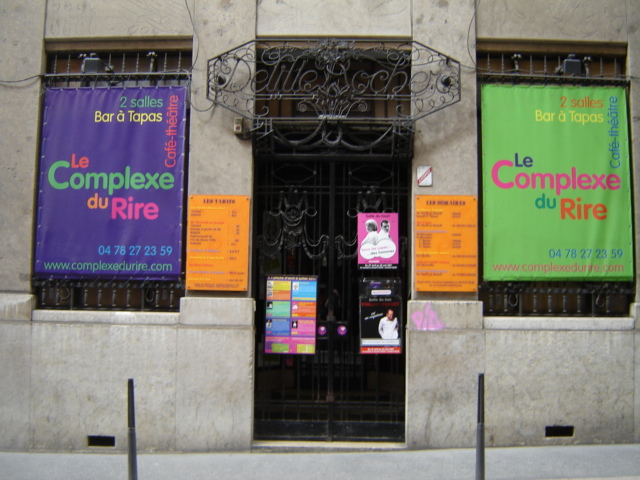
The café-théâtre Le Complexe du Rire, at No. 7

The architecture is quite simple, without frills. There is a row of old four to five-storey houses with sober facades and beautiful doors and sometimes arches. There are in this street the municipal police station, several shops and boutiques, an association for gays, the café-théâtre Le Complexe du Rire and a Church of Scientology in the square.

== Traboules ==
The streets has many traboules:

- No. 3 and 5 - 6 rue Leynaud: traboules and courtyards
- No. 6 - Place des Capuchins: traboule which leads to a beautiful garden (that of the Capuchin monks)
- No. 7: ruins of small huts
- No. 15 - rue Leynaud: staircase in the upper courtyard
- No. 19 - 3 rue Abbé Rozier: in the courtyard, two climbs of stairs are in front of each other, built in the same style as those of the Cour des Voraces
- No. 22 - 5 rue Coustou: beautiful entrance with columns
