= Place Croix-Paquet =

Square in Lyon, France

Coordinates: 45.7697°N 4.8359°E

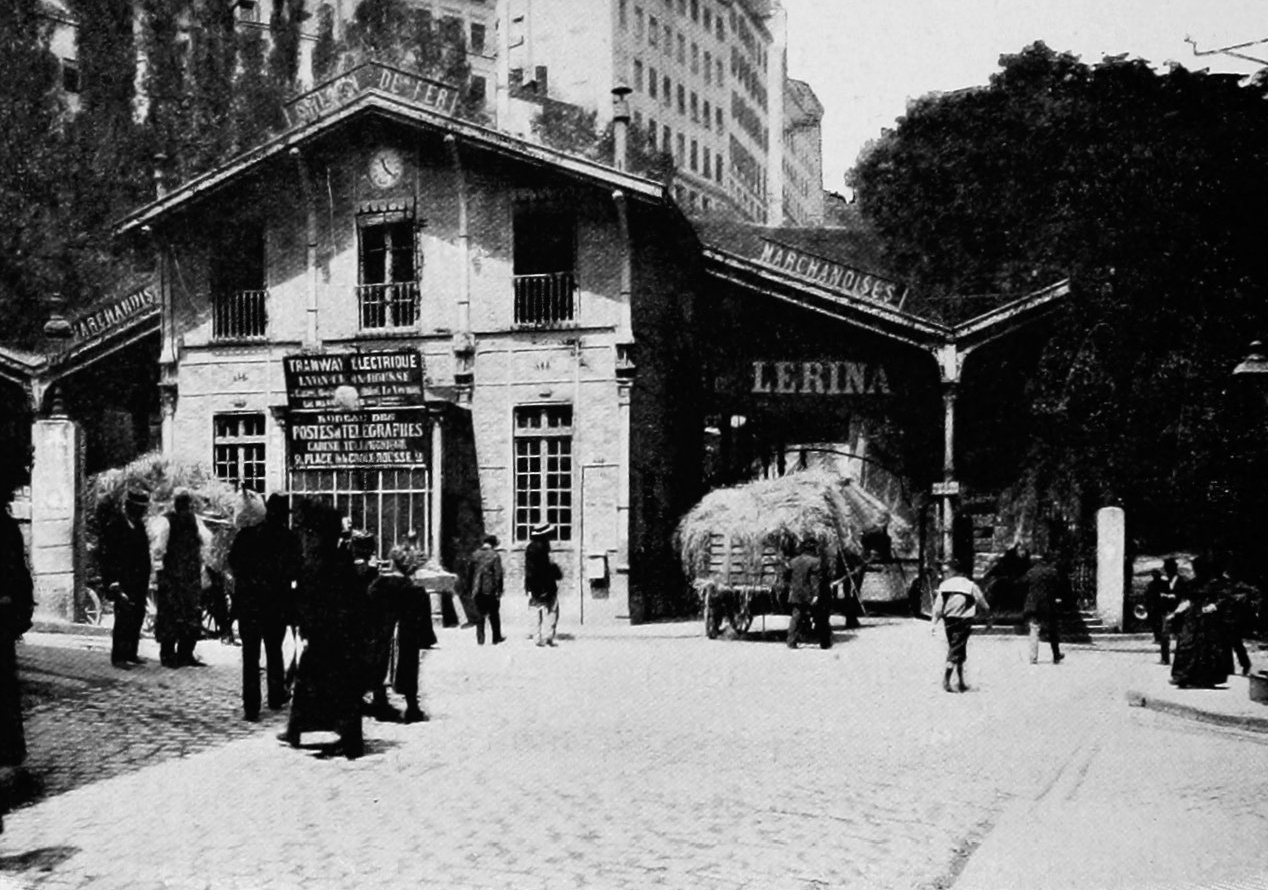
The funicular at the Place Croix-Paquet

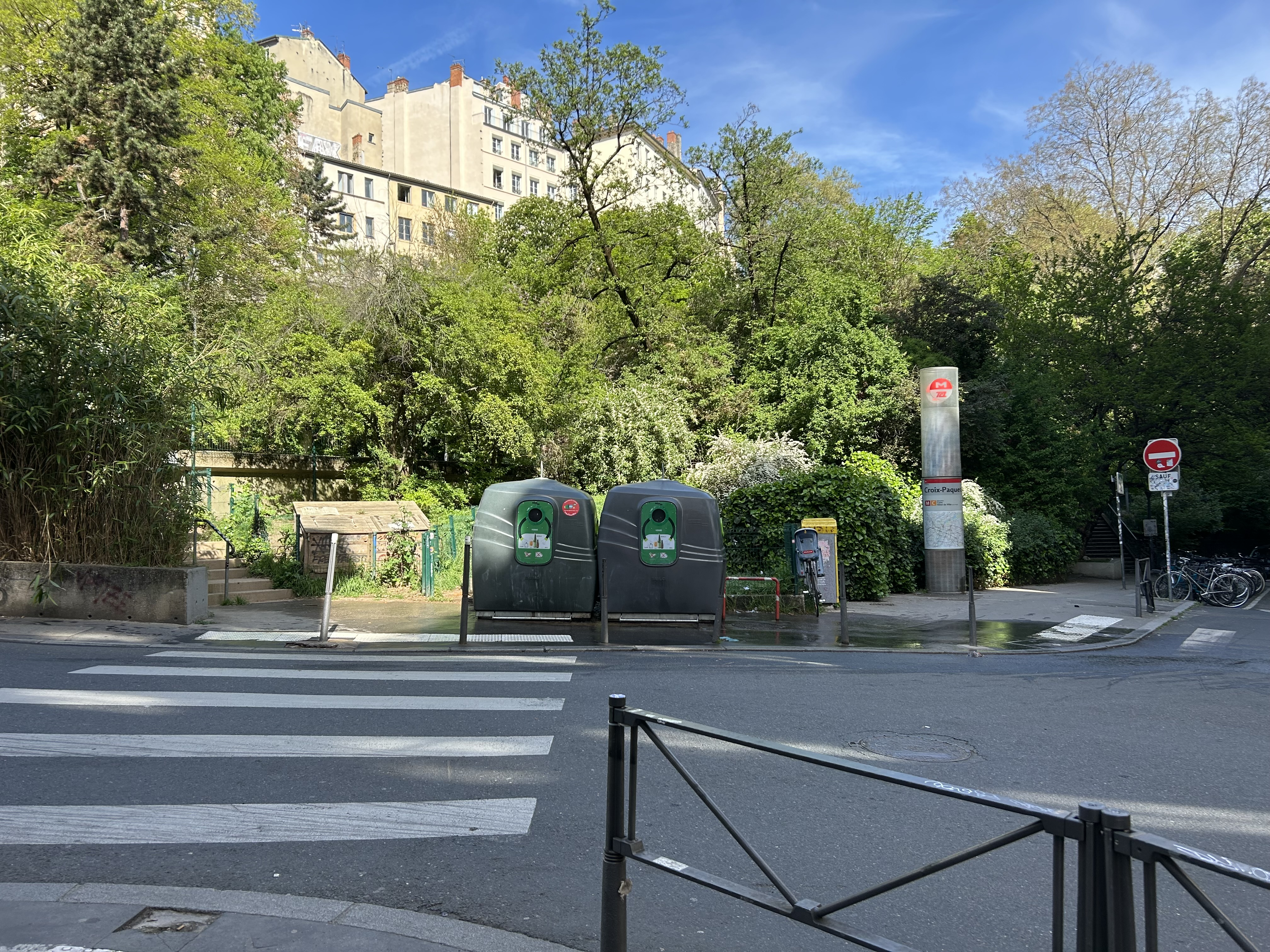
The square in 2026.

The Place Croix-Paquet (French pronunciation: [plas kʁwa pakɛ]) is a square located in the 1st arrondissement of Lyon, in the pentes de la Croix-Rousse quarter. It is formed by the intersection of the Rue du Griffon, the Rue des Capucins and the Montée Saint-Sébastien. The square belongs to the zone classified World Heritage Site by UNESCO.

== History ==
A cross was erected on the square in 1628 by the merchant Jean Paquet (also spelled Pâquet), who also owned the house at the corner of the Montée Saint-Sébastien and of the Rue René-Laynaud. This cross replaced the Croix des Rameaux (Cross of the Palms), which had previously been cut by the Calvinists in 1562. Apart from the cross which no longer exists, the square has retained the same form since the 17th century.

The square received different names over time: it was successively named Place des Rameaux (1745), then Place du Séminaire (1810), but also Croix du Griffon, then Place du Compère, then Place de la Croix des Rempeaux. In the early years of the eighteenth century, the penitents of Notre Dame de Lorette erected a chapel which was sold to the sculptor Chinard, then was replaced by a building. The Grand Séminaire was at the place now occupied by the garden along the Rue d'Alsace-Lorraine. Part of the space was occupied by the facilities of the rack and the funicular with the time (which were revised in 1976), which leads to La Croix-Rousse. Among famous people who lived in the street are the designers Jaley (1788), Mathieu Durand (1810), and Lyon scholar Paul Saint-Olive (1872-1879).

== Description ==
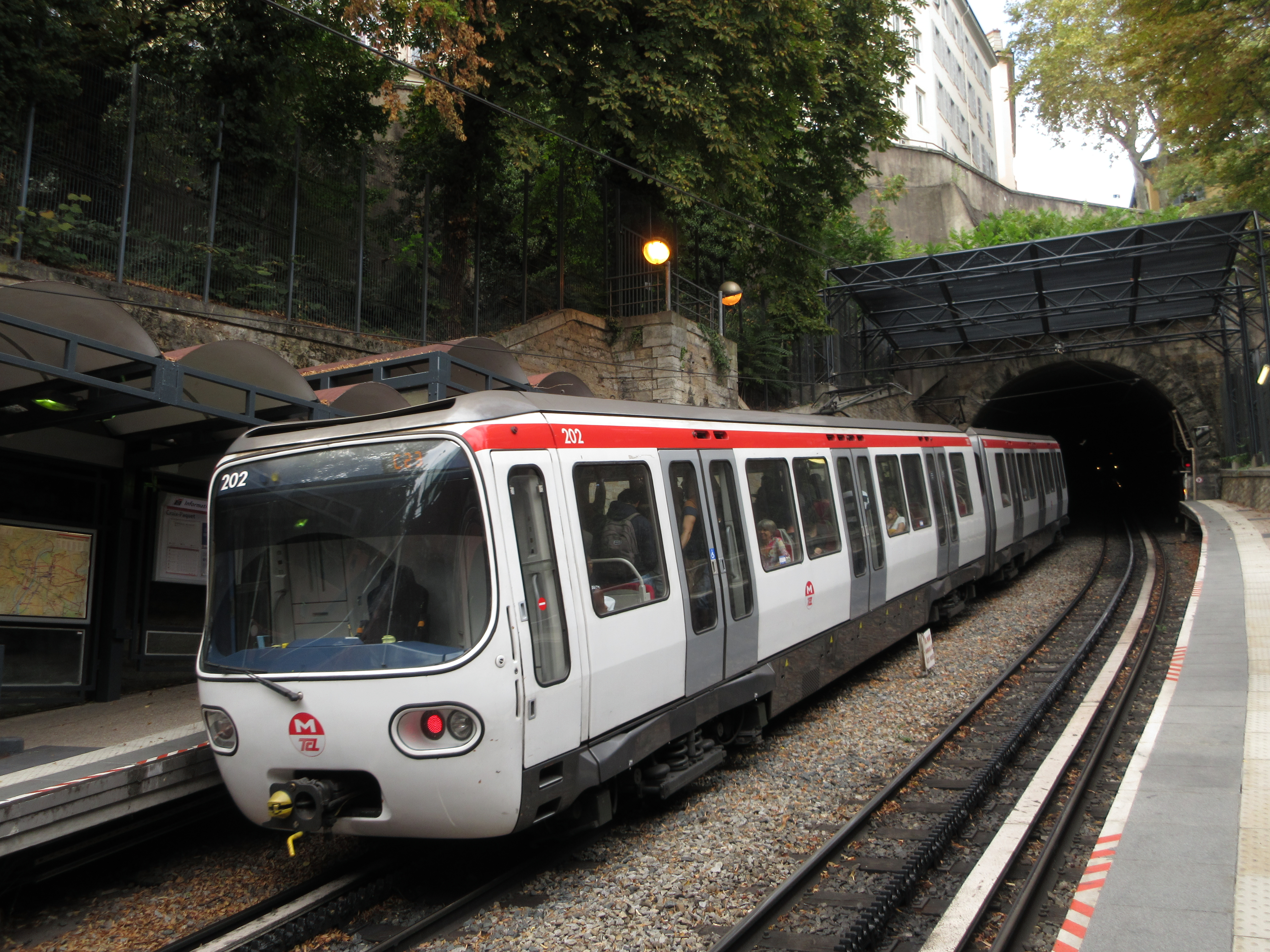
Metro train line C view from entry of the Croix-Paquet station, close to the square

The square seems more like an intersection of streets and illustrates the very old concept platea which referred to the wide section of a street. It is frequented by pedestrians and motor vehicles of all kinds, as it is located on a major strand of access to the various quarters of the 4th arrondissement of Lyon.

The square is bounded on the south by two blocks of old houses and is connected by traboules to the Petite Rue des Feuillants and the Place du Griffon. At No. 1, there is a corner traboule crossing two buildings, with a simple house on the ground floor, a wooden door with a knocker and a dark courtyard. The Cour du Moirage at No. 3 was an industry installed in 1753 by English John Badger at the request of the Duke of Mirepoix, Ambassador of France in London, and is now a straight traboule with a posh building. At No. 5, the traboule is long and spans three buildings. It consists of a small yard and a larger courtyard paved with cats heads, and has two side exits, and a straight exit through a massive passage with four columns in the style of the Passage Thiaffait. The No. 10 is isolated in the garden and remains of arches show that it was originally part of a block on the bottom of the Montée Saint-Sébastien.

There are many shops on the square, including grocery stores, a hairdresser, a doctor, a psychologist, a real estate agency, a pharmacy, a restaurant, a laundromat. The site is served by the Croix-Paquet metro station on line, originally part of the Croix-Rousse-Croix-Paquet funicular railway which was inaugurated on Sunday 12 April 1891.

The square has a significant vegetation, including acer cappadocicum, acer japonicum, Atlas Cedars and Honey locusts, and is the place of many activities organized by the city. Several redevelopments were undertaken in the 2000s: in 2000, the kindergarten Michel Servet was extended on the northern part of the garden of the square. Other works were planned for 2003. Above the metro station, several stairways provide access to the surrounding streets.

== See also ==
- List of streets and squares in Lyon
- Traboule
