= Rue du Sergent Blandan =

Thoroughfare in Lyon, France

Coordinates: 45°46′08″N 4°49′50″E

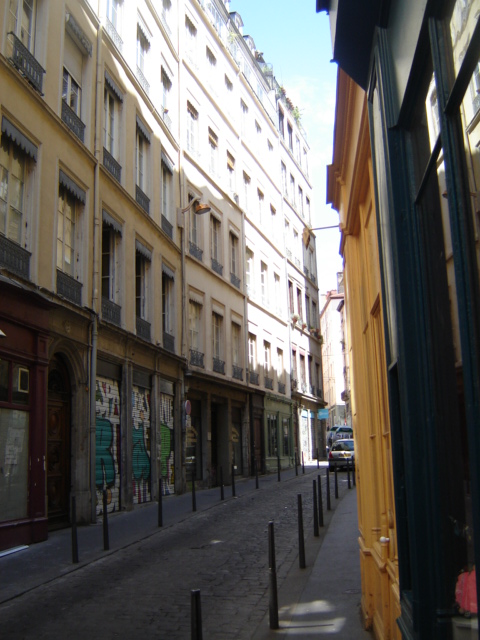
- Former name(s): Rue Saint-Marcel; Rue Musique des Anges
- Type: Street
- Location: 1st arrondissement of Lyon, Lyon, France
- Postal code: 69001

Construction
- Completion: 17th century

The Rue du Sergent Blandan (French pronunciation: [ʁy dy sɛʁʒɑ̃ blɑ̃dɑ̃]) is one of the oldest streets of Lyon. It connects Saint Vincent and the slopes of the Croix-Rousse quarters, in the 1st arrondissement of Lyon. The street starts at the Rue Pareille, runs along the Place Sathonay, crosses the Rue Hippolyte Flandrin, the Rue Louis Vitet and the Rue du Terme, and becomes the Rue des Capucins just after the square of the same name. The street belongs to the zone classified World Heritage Site by UNESCO. It is named in honour of Sergent Blandan (Jean Pierre Hippolyte Blandan), who participated in the conquest of Algeria.

== Description and architecture ==
The street is narrow and winding and ends with a short climb and a paved ground. To the north, the odd numbers side begins with a 1912 school, then there are three to five-floor old 17th-century buildings decorated with beautiful doorsteps, generally with stone arches; in front, there are also 20th-century buildings. For example, the doorstep at No. 8 shows a fight between a lion and a bull. The No. 12 and 22 have respectively ancient inscriptions that say "en toy te fie" and "non domo dominus, sed domino domus", a quote from chapter 39 of Cicero's De officiis.

== History ==
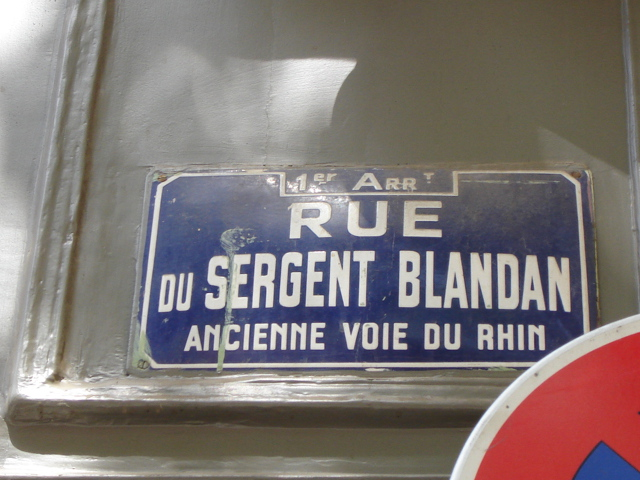
The plaque indicates that the street is the ancient route of the Rhone.

Originally, there was probably a Roman bridge, and a street name sign indicates that it is the ancient route of the Rhone.

The current form of the street dates back at least to the end of the seventeenth century. Until 1887, it was called Rue Saint-Marcel, while the part near the Saône was called Rue Musique des Anges. The name "Saint-Marcel" was chosen after a former anchorite and a former gate of the city.

At the time, the street provided access to two major climbs to leave Lyon to the north, the montée de la Grande Côte and the montée des Carmélites. There were two monasteries located in the street: the Benedictines of the Desert since 1296, and the Grands Augustins between 1319 and 1509, but these monasteries have moved. The Confraternity of Penitents of the Holy Crucifix was installed in the street in 1633, and, during the Ancien Régime, was the owner of the chapel rebuilt in 1643 which was demolished during the Reign of Terror and replaced by a house that currently overlooks the montée de la Grande Côte.

The street was eventually named with its current name after the deliberation of the municipal council on 26 April 1887.

In 1804, the first Jacquard loom was installed in the street. Circa 1981, Radio Canut was housed at No. 24. On 8 February 2005, the city of Lyon installed a plaque as tribute to Jewish children of the school who were deported and killed during the Second World War. Among the famous inhabitants of the street, there are the painters Jacques Collet (1557) and Jean Montet (1785), and the designer Martin François (1887). The father of artist Paul Chenavard was a dyer in the Rue Saint-Marcel.
