= Place Sathonay =

Square in Lyon, France

Coordinates: 45.769117°N 4.830444°E

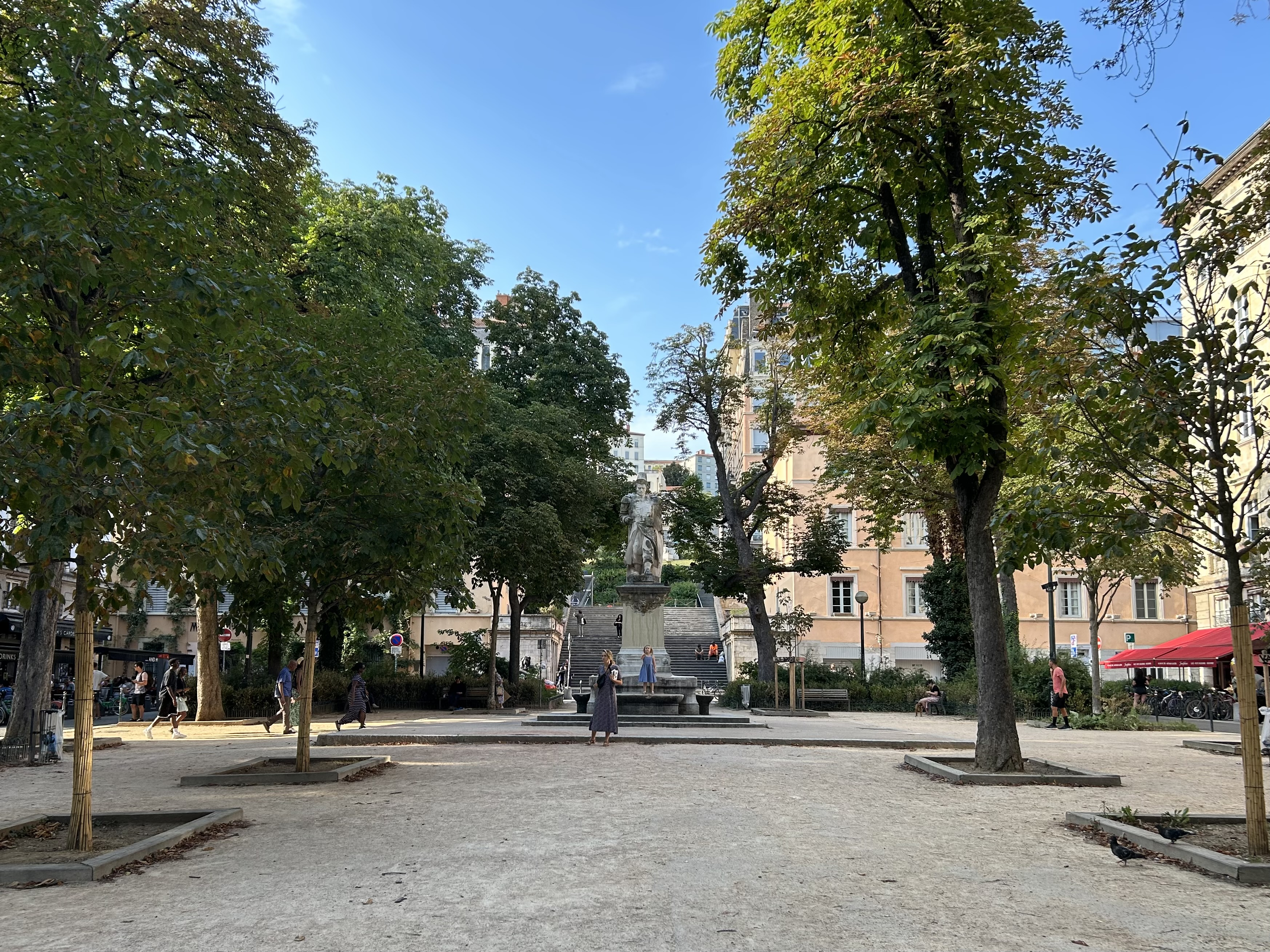
Sathonay square in 2025.

The Place Sathonay (French pronunciation: [plas satɔnɛ]) is a square located in the 1st arrondissement of Lyon, France, at the bottom of hill of La Croix-Rousse, in La Martinière quarter. It was named after Nicolas-Marie-Jean-Claude Fay de Sathonay, mayor of Lyon from 1805 to 1812, as a tribute for all the importants works undertaken under his presidency. The square is currently the third largest square in Lyon and belongs to the zone classified as World Heritage Site by UNESCO. According to Lyon geography agrégé Jean Pelletier, it is "one of the most interesting squares of Lyon", because of its harmonious proportions, its boundaries composed of buildings with beautiful 1920s facades, and its plantations, which brings "a charm tinged of poetry" and give it the appearance of a village square.

== History ==
=== The former square ===
Before the deliberation of the municipal council on 22 August 1817, the square was called Place de la Déserte. According to the 1268 Tractatus de bellis, inhabitants of Lyon built fortifications in the Déserte to defend themselves from the ecclesiastical authority. In 1296, Blanche de Châlons, widow of the lord of Beaujeu, Rhone acquired from Jean Mallerie the parcel "proche de la porte nouvelle" (near the new gate) and founded in 1304 the monastery or abbey of the same name, which they gave to the Ladies of Saint Clair or Clarisses or which came under the rule of Saint Benoit. In 1318, Blanche de Châlons' son left the vine of the Varissonnière to the religious order, and in 1439, the businessman Pierre du Nyèvre transferred the Clos of the vine, which enlarged the field of Order of Poor Ladies. In 1745, their possessions were composed of a quadrilateral area bounded by the Rue du Sergent Blandan (south), the Montée des Carmélites (west), the Rue du Bon Pasteur (north) and the Montée de la Grande Côte (east).

From 1791, the property of religious congregations of the hill of La Croix-Rousse were sold and became a national property. The first property auction was that of the Carthusians in September 1791. The gardens of the lower part were given free to the city by decrees of the representative of the people Poulin-Grandpré, on 14 November 1795. In 1802, this steepest part of the land to the north, was turned into a garden of plants, still visible today. The southern part of the place was given to the city on 19 January 1818. The rest of the buildings belongs now to the department as a national property and was ceded to the Lyon city. Finally, the buildings were destroyed in 1813, excepted the building that currently houses the City Hall of the arrondissement, and replaced by a square paved with pebbles and flat stones.

=== The contemporary square ===
In 1817, the municipal architect Louis Flachéron proposed to enlarge the square and to create an entry to the garden of plants. The square, almost immediately named Place Sathonay, was created under the Mayor of Fargues and was studied in detail by a committee chaired by Paulet which drew up the plan which was approved on 10 December 1817. Providing a good view on the steps at the north appeared to be a major concern then: indeed, the idea of erecting a central fountain was eventually withdrawn for this reason, and the whole composition was based on a north–south axis, as shown by the original plan. It had an area of 4,000 m^{2}, and the stairs at the north of the square next to the city hall provided an access to the former garden of plants.

Knight and Baron Antoine Fay (18th century), architect Louis Flacheron and lawyer Jean Pine des Granges (19th century) lived on this square. Circa 1830, an ancient Roman house with a bathroom and three mosaics was discovered at the corner of the Rue Poivre.

The City Hall of the 1st arrondissement in 2026.

In 1830, houses with commercial or mixed use (i.e. for both housing and work) in 1820s-1830s buildings are mainly composed of one or two rooms (52%), but there were also some commercial premises with seven-eight rooms. The square was mainly inhabited by small traders (60%) and silk agents (26%). Family and professional life was often merged as 69.2% of homes had both uses. Those who had a flat exclusively for housing on the place were mainly rentiers (40%) who generally lived at second and third floors with about 3.7 rooms. There was, at that time, none loom on the square. In 1831, the buildings at Nos. 5 and 6 of the square were respectively the second and the fifth new buildings of the eastern part of the hill which had the highest rental value (11,045 and 9,200 FF). They were composed of 46 and 31 apartments with a total of 105 and 86 rooms.

== Architecture ==
=== Buildings ===
To the north, the square is opened by a staircase called the Montée de l'Amphithéâtre and flanked by two identical buildings, the one on the left built between 1819 and 1823. On both sides of the staircase, there are two fountains adorned with bronze lions made by the Fonderie nationale du Creusot and erected in 1823, which are replicas of the lions adorning the Acqua Felice Fountain in Rome. The side streets were built around 1820–1821. At the east and west, there are four buildings of four floors.

The architecture of the facades is usually very rich. Indeed, according to writer Josette Barre, "the facades are opulent, decorated with wrought iron railings, large doorways in wood, stone, pilasters and pediments for most openings of the first floors. The windows are high up to the third floor, then smaller with openings sometimes replaced by a mansard at the last floor".

The corner traboule of the Place Sathonay, which crosses a building built in 1822, is closed. There is currently the Police station of the 1st arrondissement, at No. 5 (the building immediately at left of the staircase).

=== Statue and fountain ===
In the nineteenth century, the square was decorated with a fountain topped by a bronze statue portraying French inventor Joseph Marie Jacquard, made by Foyatier and inaugurated on Sunday 16 August 1840; however, the statue was later removed. The site was successfully planted with chestnut trees at the same time. There are some benches and, near the city hall, an impatiens clump and buxus.

At the center of the square, there is currently a statue of Jean Pierre Hippolyte Blandan (also named Sergeant Blandan), born in the neighborhood and killed during the conquest of Algeria in 1842. The 2.8-metre statue in bronze was made by Thomas Lamotte and was raised on a stone plinth by architect Joseph Dubuisson and the whole cost 19,420 francs. It was inaugurated on 22 April 1900 at an expensive ceremony reported in Le Progrès. But it disappeared during the Second World War and was replaced by a new statue in stone after the war.

There is a statue of Virgin Mary at No. 4, rue des Farges.

== See also ==
- List of streets and squares in Lyon
