= Bernard Berthod =

French historian, physician and writer

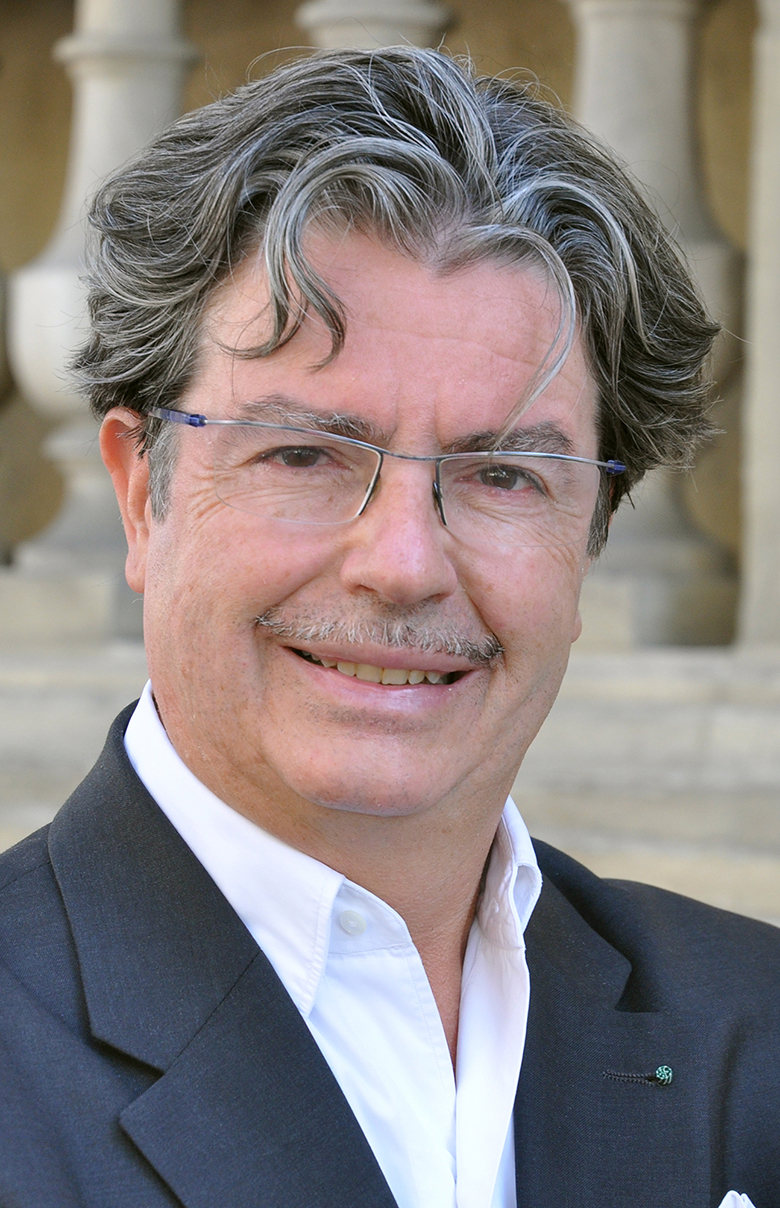
- Born: October 13, 1952 (age 73); Lyon, France
- Occupations: Historian, physician, writer

Bernard Berthod (born September 13, 1952, in Lyon, France) physician, historian, writer and presenter of exhibitions from Lyon, France.

His father ran a number of business in the silk trade on the la Croix Rousse mount. He studied medical studies and odontostomatology and undertook a thesis on Jean-Jacques de Gorla, Lyon surgeon and father-Molière. He then began studying history where he undertook a thesis at the University of Lyon III on the Lyon silversmith Armand Calliat for which he received a degree of Doctor of Letters.

== Exhibitions ==
- In 1983, Religious Anjou and Goldsmiths the XIX^{e} siècle in Angers
- In 1986, Bossan and Armand Calliat in Museum of Fine Arts of Lyon
- In 1993, Silk yarn Chambord
- In 1994, Liturgical Treasure of the Cathedral of Moulins, the General Council of the Allier
- In 1995, The Sacred Heart of Montmartre with the City of Paris
- In 2001, 20 centuries Cathedral at the Museum of Tau Reims
- In 2003, Froment-Meurice Goldsmiths at the Museum of Romantic Life

He regularly during seminar s organized by the National Heritage School and the DRAC on matters concerning the liturgy and sacred art at XIX^{e} and XX^{e} siècle.

== Books and papers ==
Bernard Berthod is also the author of numerous scholarly articles and co-wrote and directed: the Historical Dictionary of fabrics (Editions de l'Amateur, Paris, 1994)

- le Dictionnaire historique des étoffes (Editions de l'Amateur, Paris, 1994)
- le Dictionnaire des Arts liturgiques ( Editions de l'Amateur, Paris, 1996)
- le Dictionnaire iconographique des Saints (Editions de l'Amateur, Paris, 1999)
- les Trésors inconnus du Vatican (Editions de l'Amateur, Paris, 2001)
- Goudji (Editions de l'Amateur, Paris, 2002)
- le Dictionnaire des objets de dévotion (Editions de l'Amateur, Paris, 2006)
- l’Histoire de l’Eglise de Lyon (La Taillanderie, Châtillon-sur-Chalaronne, 2007)
- Do ut Des, les ex voto lyonnais et Lyon de A à Z (La Taillanderie, Châtillon-sur-Chalaronne, 2008)
- Grandes figures de l'Ordre de Malte (Arpège, Perpignan, 2010)
- Goudji, des mains d'or et de Feu (Thalia, Paris, 2011)
- le Dictionnaire des Arts liturgiques du moyen-âge à nos jours (Frémur, Châteauneuf-sur-Charente, 2015)

He is a member of the International Council of Museums (ICOM) since 1992 and vice president of ICOM Costume since 2013

== Awards ==
- chevalier de l'Ordre national du Mérite en 2009.
- chevalier (1997) puis officier (2005) de l'Ordre des Arts et des Lettres.
- chevalier de l'Ordre de Saint-Grégoire-le-Grand (Saint-Siège) en 2006.
- chevalier de l'Ordre de l'Étoile de la solidarité italienne (République italienne) en 2009.
- chevalier Grand-Croix de l'Ordre du Saint-Sépulcre de Jérusalem en 2014.

In November 2007, he won the Académie des Sciences Morales et Politiques: it receives the price of the Canon Delpeuch Foundation, "for all of his work and its action in favor of religious heritage".
