= Église Notre Dame Saint-Vincent =

Roman Catholic church in Lyon, France

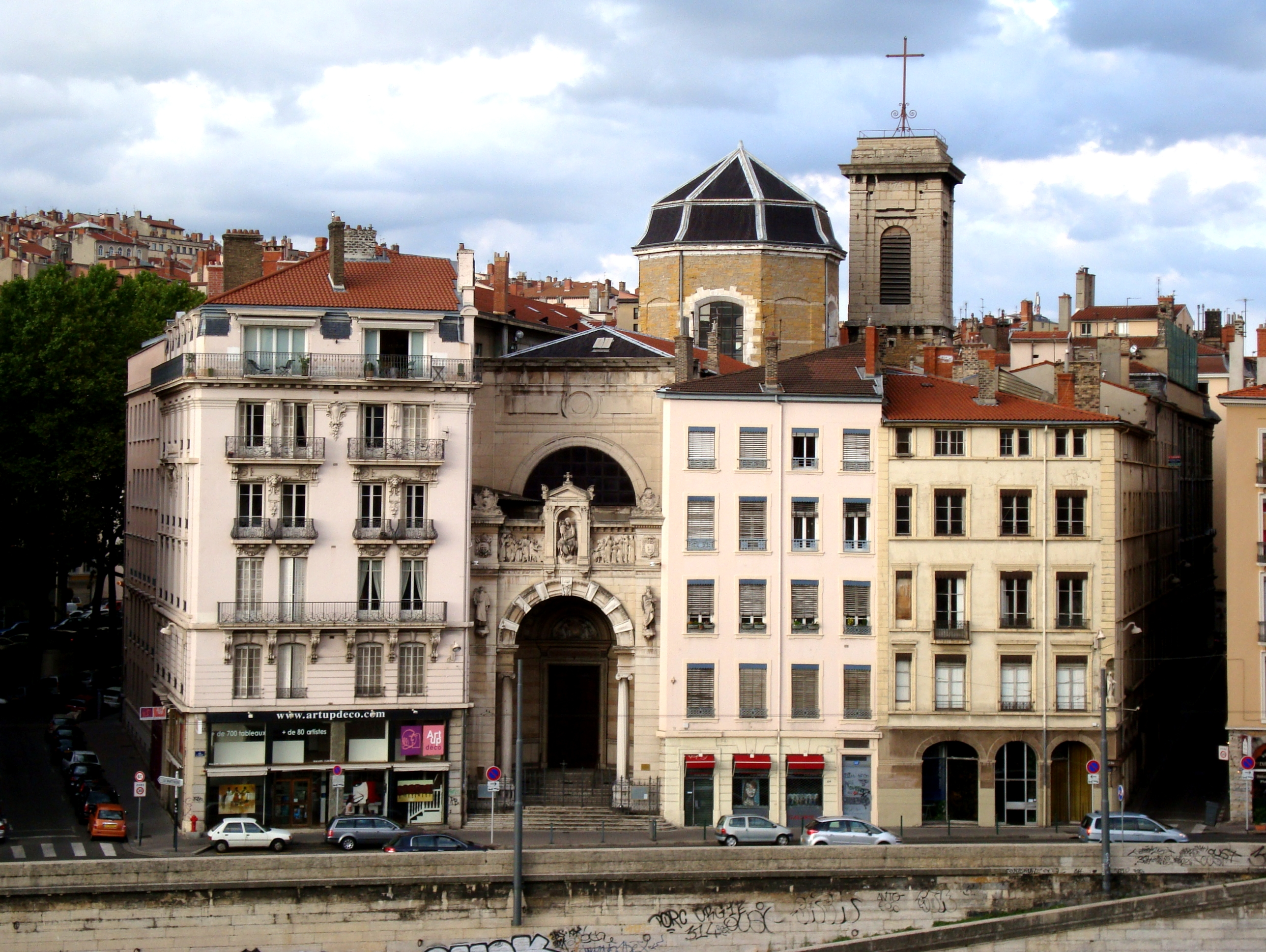
- General view of the church

Religion
- Affiliation: Roman Catholic Church
- Diocese: 1st arrondissement of Lyon
- Ecclesiastical or organizational status: Cathedral

Location
- Location: Lyon, France
- Interactive map of Église Notre Dame Saint-Vincent
- Coordinates: 45.767352°N 4.829264°E

Architecture
- Type: Church
- Completed: 1789

Website
- saintvincent-saintpaul.paroisse.net

The Église Notre Dame Saint-Vincent (French pronunciation: [eɡliz nɔtʁə dam sɛ̃ vɛ̃sɑ̃]) is a Roman Catholic church located in Lyon, on the banks of the Saône, quai Saint-Vincent, in the 1st arrondissement of Lyon. In 1984, it was classified as monument historique.

== History ==
The church was built by Augustinian monks in 1759, when they were present in the area from the fourteenth century. The plans of the church were drawn by Léonard Roux. It was finally completed on 4 June 1789 by Joseph Janin, and was called Église Saint-Louis, as tribute to Louis Le Dauphin, who had contributed financially to its construction. A book called "Book of Accounts" was written to trace the entire history of the construction of the church. It took its current name in 1863.

In 1793, the church served as hospital, then warehouse and gendarmerie.

In 1933, Mortamet restored the church. In 1941, a number of Lyon Catholics, Protestants and agnostics met fortnightly in the crypt of the Église Notre Dame Saint-Vincent to discuss in depth Hitler's Mein Kampf. On 12 December 1987, the church was destroyed by fire, but was reopened on 29 November 1992 after a major renovation. The organ, installed on the platform, was inaugurated on 26 March 1995.

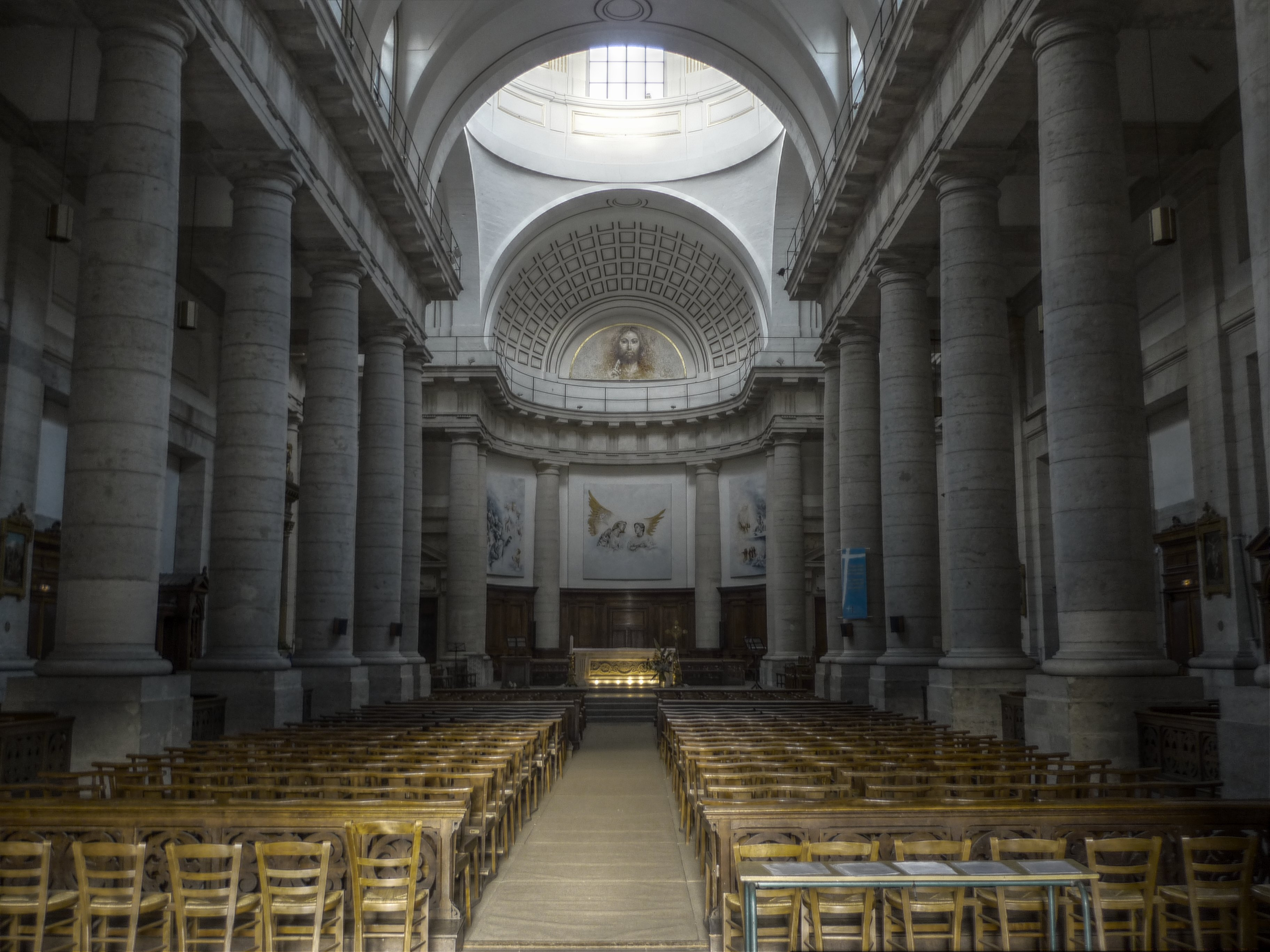
Interior of the church

== Architecture ==
Inside, there are 18 cylindrical columns in the nave and large rectangular windows in the dome.

The facade of the church, decorated with a statue of the Virgin Mary and a frieze, was made by Charles Dufraine and has a round arch and two Ionic columns.
