= Passage Thiaffait =

Coordinates: 45°46′12″N 4°49′59″E

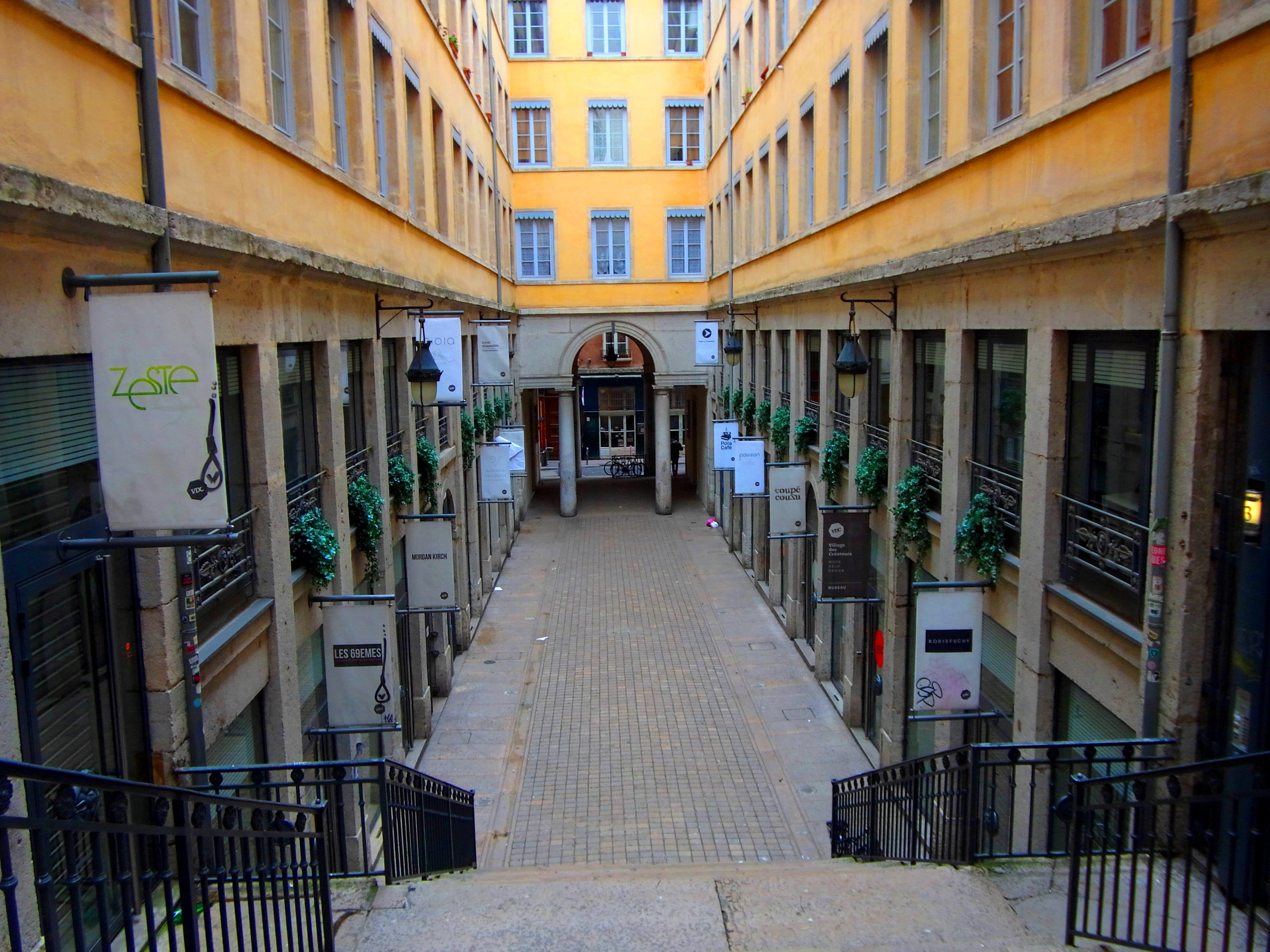
- Passage Thiaffait.
- Type: Traboule
- Location: 1st arrondissement of Lyon, Lyon, France
- Postal code: 69001

Construction
- Completion: 1827

The Passage Thiaffait is an urban area located on the slopes of La Croix-Rousse, in the 1st arrondissement of Lyon. It has an entry by a portico (Rue René Leynaud) and is a curved traboule (path) which ends with a staircase leading to the hill (Rue Burdeau). The street belongs to the zone classified as World Heritage Site by UNESCO.

== History ==
The Passage Thiaffait was built in the early 19th century (in 1827). It was opened under Louis-Philippe and was named after Mr. Thiaffait who built the house and the traboule. He was a member of the Office of Charity (Bureau de Bienfaisance) and president of the Society of Primary Instruction (Société d'Instruction Élémentaire), and died on 14 April 1861. Around 1827, Father Guerin installed in the traboule the orchestra he had founded to promote music.

After two decades of dilapidation and insecurity, the renovation of the Passage Thiaffait was decided in 1997 and completed in 2001. Some premises are now used as studios and workshops. In 2000, all shops / workshops were named The Village of creators (Le village des créateurs), which achieved notability throughout France and Europe.

During the renovation, a plaque "Thiaffait" was also raised at the entrance of the Passage Donat.
