= Cour des Voraces =

Building in Lyon, France

Coordinates: 45°46′19″N 4°50′05″E

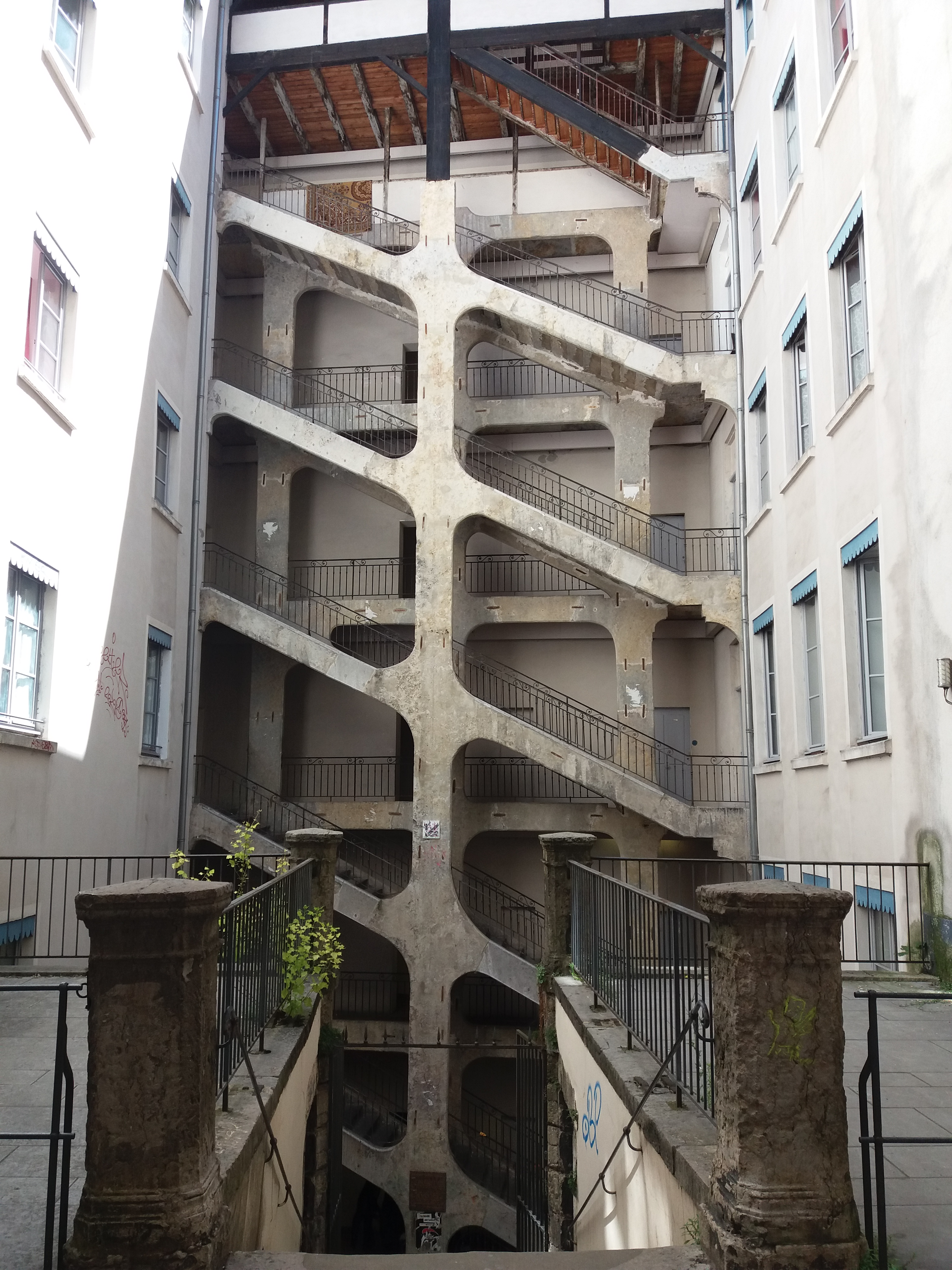
- The free-flight stairs of the Cour des Voraces
- Location: 1st arrondissement of Lyon, Lyon, France
- Postal code: 69001

The Cour des Voraces ([kuʁ de vɔʁas]; "Court of the voracious ones"), also called Maison de la République, is a courtyard building in the Pentes quarter, in the 1st arrondissement of Lyon, famous for its enormous six-floor stairway. It is an impressive traboule, a covered passage with entrances on the Place Colbert, Montée Saint-Sébastien and Rue Imbert-Colomès.

== History ==
Situated on the slopes of the Croix-Rousse, the court is a major symbol of Lyon. Built in 1840, it is a fine example of the folk architecture of the canuts, related to the silk weaving industry, which deeply marked the neighborhood. It is also a place that symbolizes some great moments in the history of Lyon. A plaque on the building reads: "In the Cour des Voraces, hive of silk work, canuts struggled for their lives and their dignity." The name of the building comes from a group of workers called the Voraces weavers, who reputedly distinguished themselves by their republican insurrections of 1848 and 1849.

According to sources, the Court of Voraces would have served as a refuge for canuts workers during their revolts. Given the date of construction, this may refer to fighting during the second uprising of Voraces in 1849. The building housed the lodge of a mutual organization of canuts: Le Devoir mutuel. There is a theory that the word Dévoirant, namely Le Devoir mutual members, may eventually have been corrupted to the word "Voraces".

During the Second World War, traboules of Lyon were dark and secret places, little known to foreigners, and their configuration enabled resistance networks to escape the surveillance of the German occupiers. Therefore, the Cour des Voraces remains often mentioned as a symbol of resistance.

In 1995, the Habitat et Humanisme Association led by Father Bernard Devers bought the place and launched the rehabilitation of the court that became a symbol of social housing.

The court (its floor and its two staircases) is classified as monument historique.

== See also ==
- Traboule
