= Rue de l'Arbre-Sec =

Street in Lyon, France

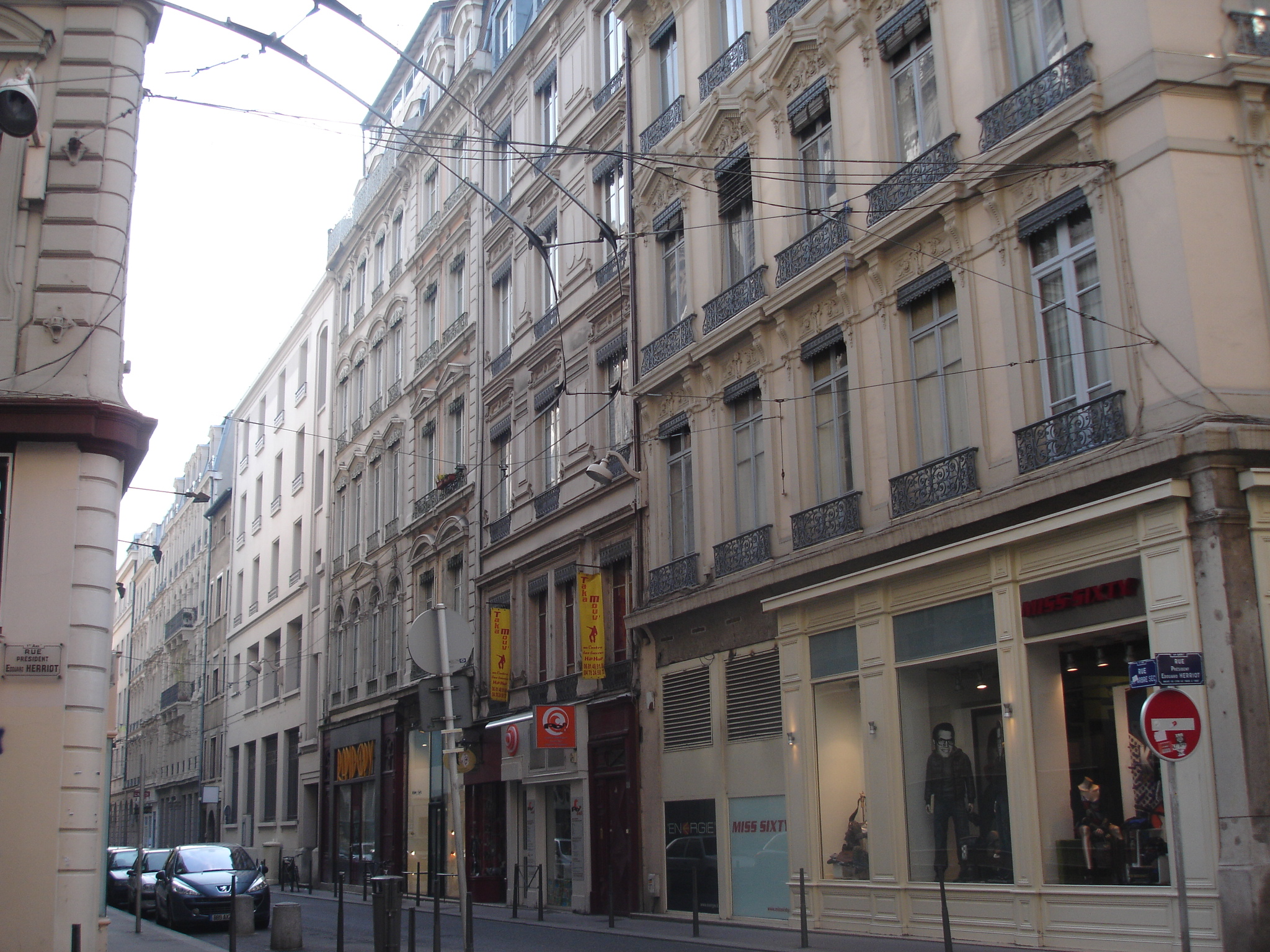
- Type: Street
- Location: 1st arrondissement of Lyon, Lyon, France
- Postal code: 69001
- Coordinates: 45.76612°N 4.836431°E

The Rue de l'Arbre-Sec (French pronunciation: [ʁy də laʁbʁ sɛk]) is an old street located in the 1st arrondissement of Lyon, near the Place des Terreaux and the Opera Nouvel. It starts perpendicular to the Rue Édouard-Herriot and ends with the Quai Jean Moulin crossing the Rue de la République. The name dates from the 14th century and was probably chosen because of a dry tree that could be seen in this street and of an inn sign.

== History ==
The 1745 almanac of Lyon justified the name of the street stating that a stunted tree which was very dry could be seen at one end of the street.

In 1518, a plan for drainage, grading and crossing of the street was decided by Jean de Paris. In the nineteenth century, the zone between the Rue Garet and the Rhône was named Rue Basseville in which there were six silk workshops; it became part of the Rue de l'Arbre-Sec in 1855.

The street was already on a plan of 1550 and was inhabited almost exclusively by silk workers, potters and tile makers (in 1828, there were twelve silk workshops and 43 houses). When he restructured the quarter, prefect Claude-Marius Vaïsse decided to demolish some old buildings to build the Rue de l'Hôtel de Ville and the Rue de la République. On 25 June 1778, cobbler Durant, who lived in the street, was convicted of illegally practicing medicine.

In 1831, a lot of umbrellas with handle containing a triangular dagger were discovered at No. 14.

In 1844, there was the Hôtel de France at No.13. In 1847, a chapel in the street was then the only evangelical place of worship in Lyon at the time. Among the famous residents of the street, there were the family of Louise Labé, painter Salomon Bernard (16th century), and architects Barthélémy Vignon and Prosper Mourand (19th century).

== Architecture ==
The street is slightly curved. It is first wide and lined with buildings of about 1870 with wrought iron balconies and decorations. Further, the SocGen has also wrought iron arches. After the Rue Garet, the street is narrower and older, with simple facades and stone arches. The street name is engraved in stone of the last building that is fairly recent, at number 20. The iron balcony at No. 8 dates from 1863. The houses at No. 10 and 12 have arcades, and the No. 22 displays the inscription "Le Thuilerie, 1702".

There are many restaurants and bouchons, including Le Petit Damier and Le Connétable.

There is a straight blocked up traboule at No. 8 which starts with a building of 1863 and includes a path with edge vault.

== Photos ==
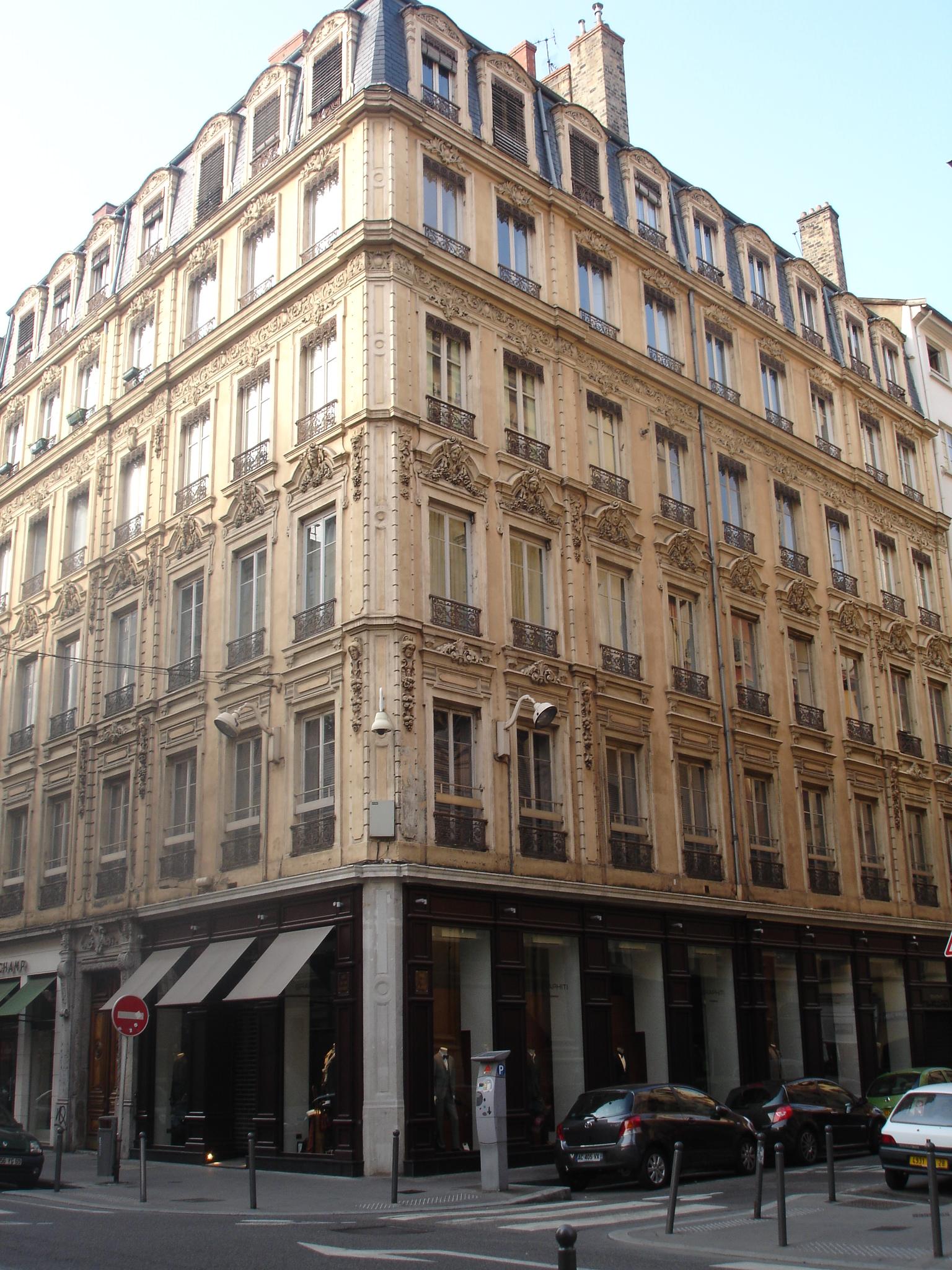
The corner of the street with the Rue Édouard-Herriot

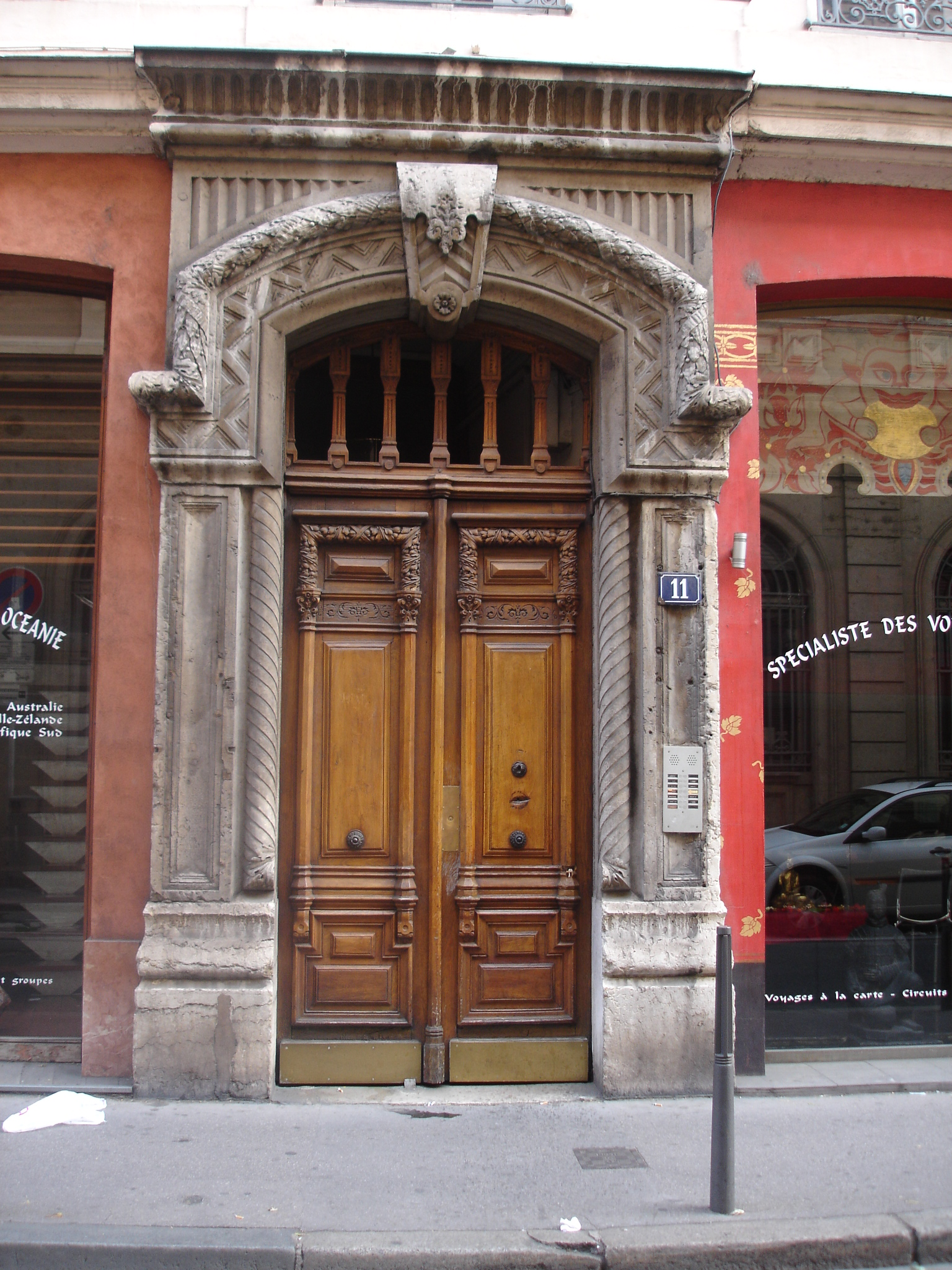
Building door of the 20th century

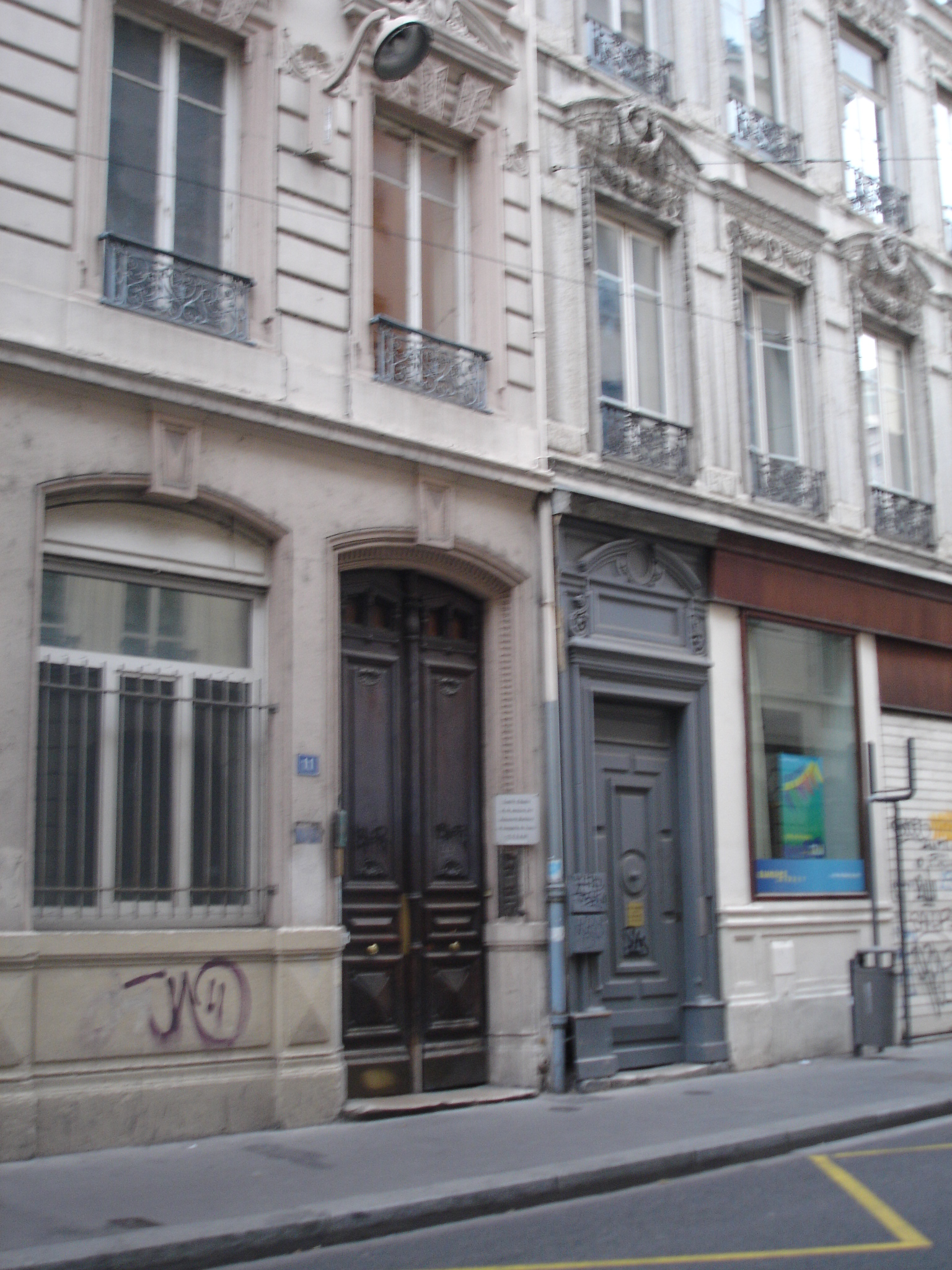
Building door

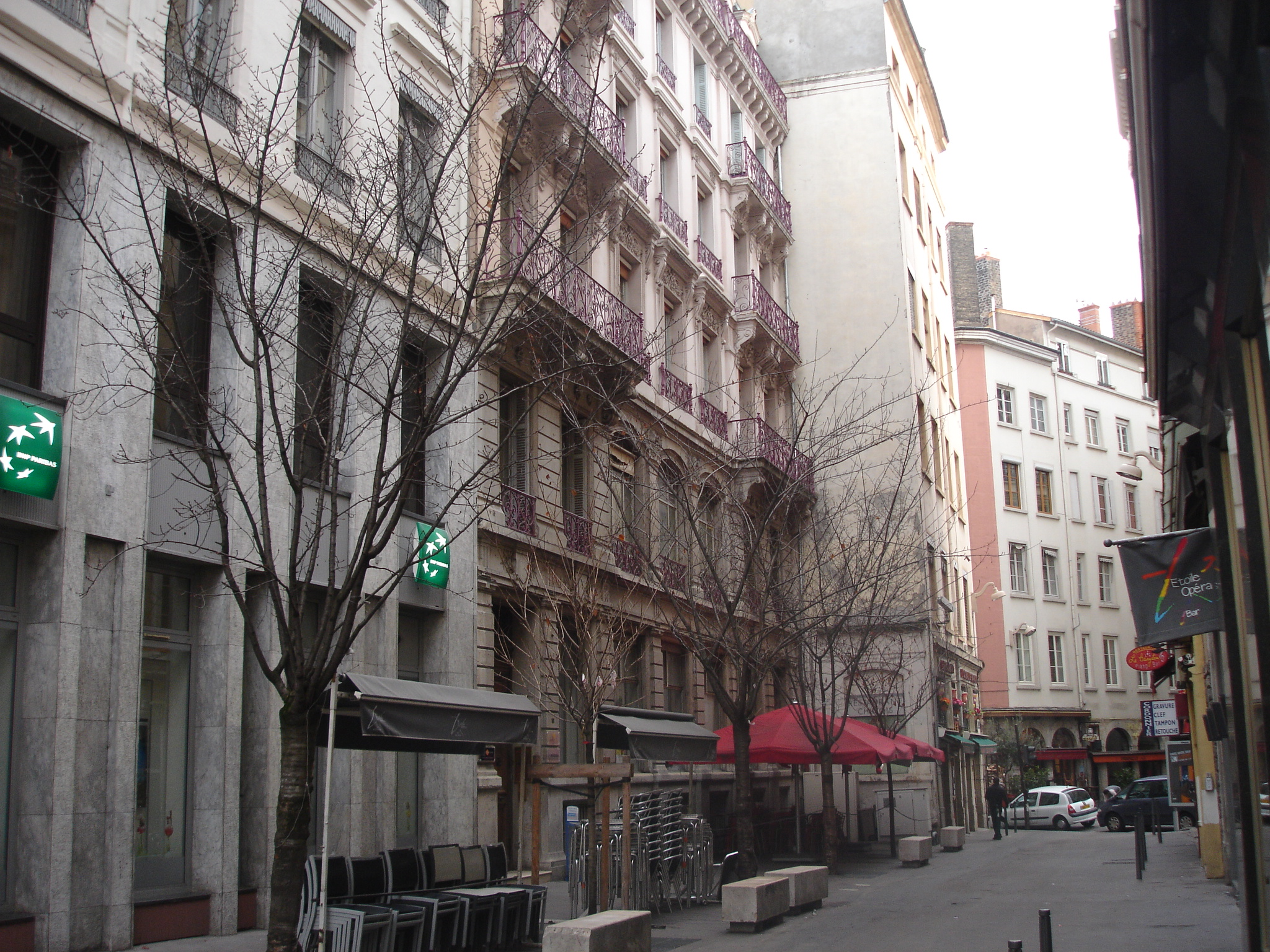
View on the Rhône side

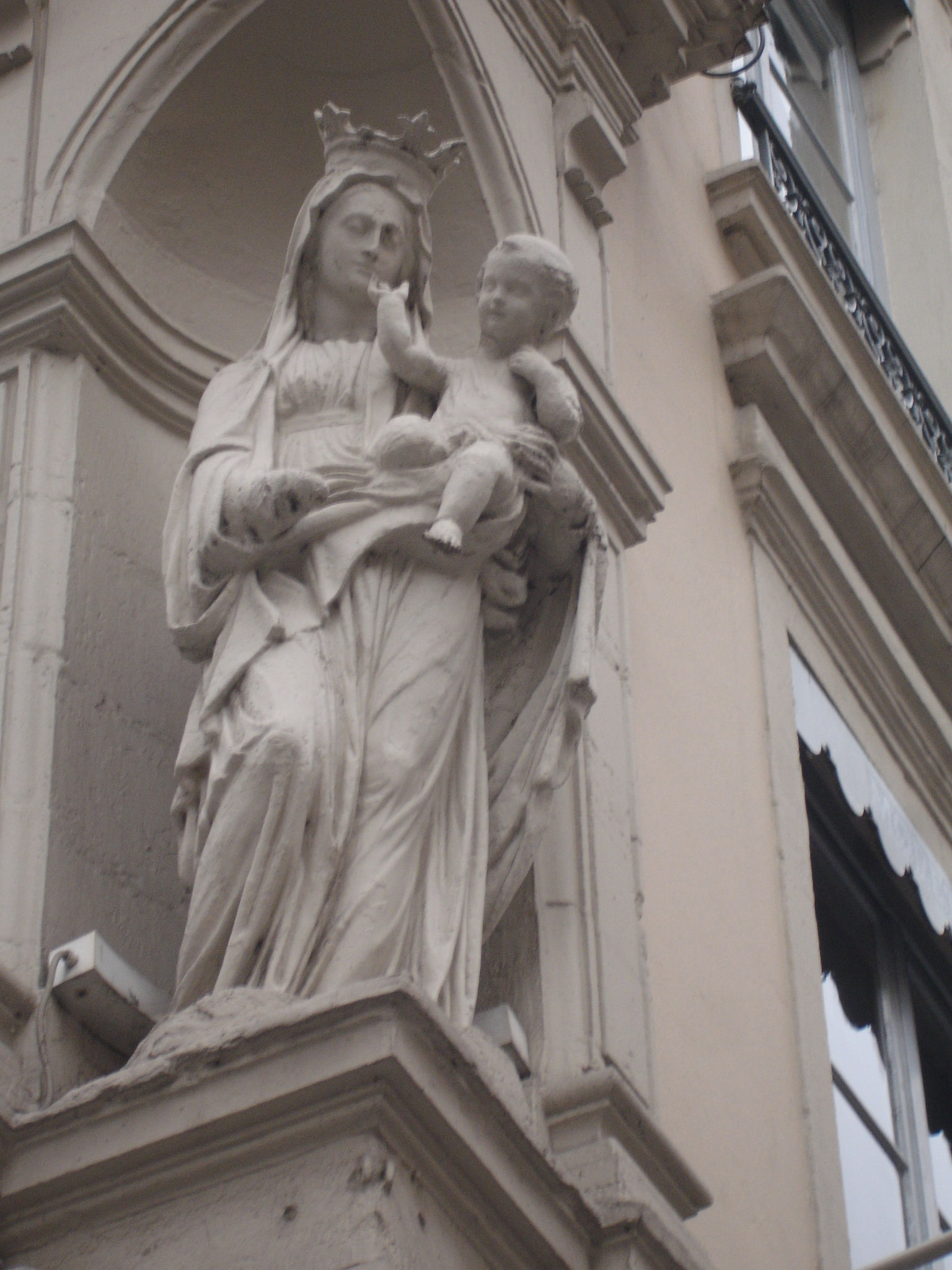
A Madonna and Child

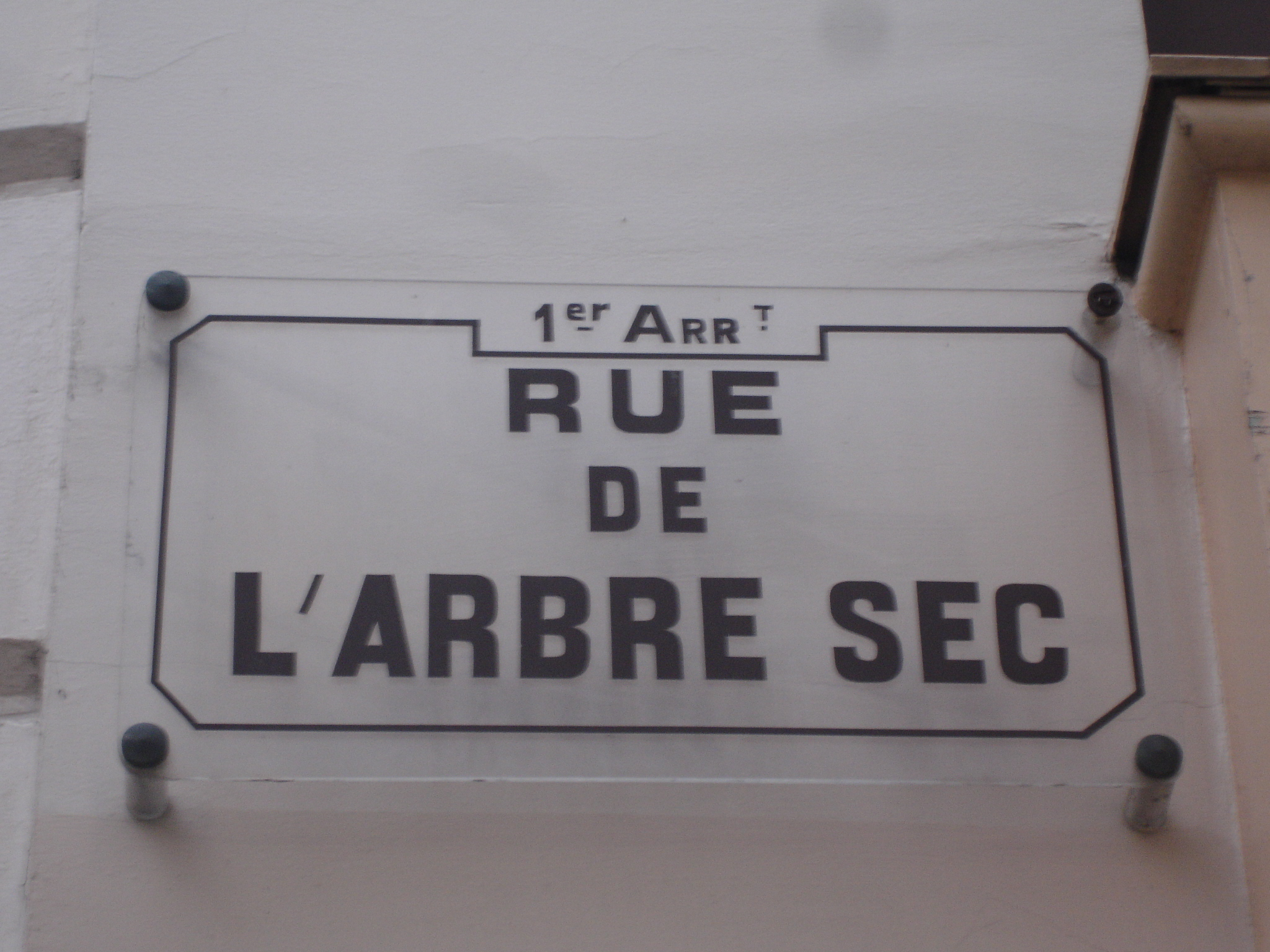
Plaque of the street
