= Boulevard de la Croix-Rousse =

Thoroughfare in Lyon, France

- Boulevard de l'Empereur, Boulevard de la Grenouille
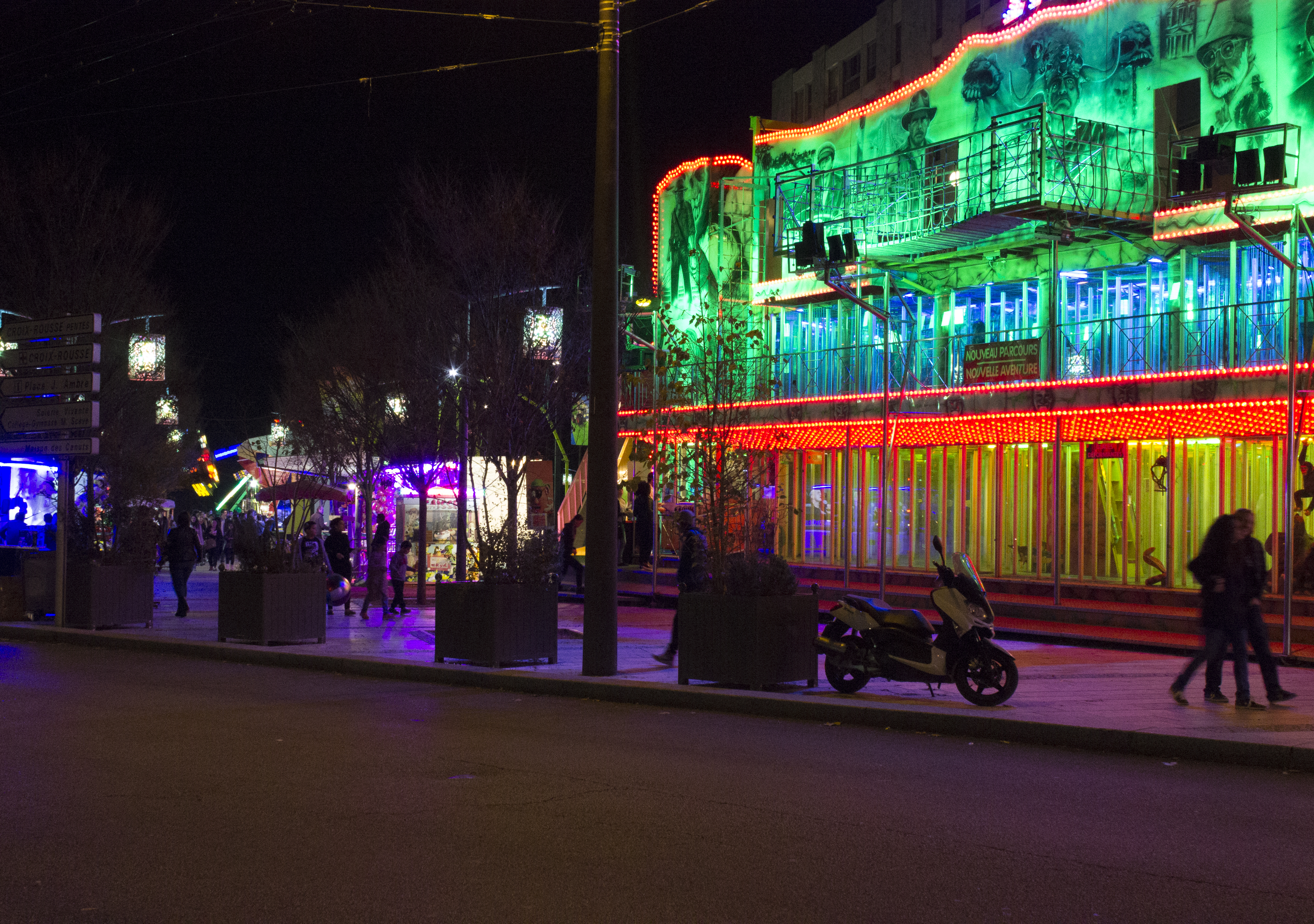
- Boulevard de la Croix-Rousse during the Vogue des Marrons fair.
- Interactive map of Boulevard de la Croix-Rousse
- Type: Boulevard
- Location: Lyon, Rhône-Alpes
- Quarter: Croix-Rousse, (4th arrondissement)
- Postal code: 69004
- Coordinates: 45.774272°N 4.829994°E

The Boulevard de la Croix-Rousse (French pronunciation: [bulvaʁ də la kʁwa ʁus]) is a boulevard that marks the border between the 1st and the 4th arrondissements of Lyon, in the neighborhood Croix-Rousse.

== Location ==
The boulevard runs east–west and is the border between the 1st and 4th arrondissements and the neighborhoods Pentes de la Croix-Rousse and Plateau de la Croix-Rousse.

== History ==
The Croix-Rousse ramparts were reconstructed in 1834 on the remains of 16th century ramparts, which had been demolished during the revolt of Lyon against the National Convention in 1793. In 1852 when Croix-Rousse became a quarter of Lyon the ramparts were destroyed to facilitate the integration of the new quarter. The Boulevard de l'Empereur was constructed on the former site of these fortifications in 1865. A town hall was built and trees were planted along the boulevard at this time.

The Croix-Rousse Market and the Vogue fair (formerly the Parish Festival of the church of Saint-Denis) began to take place on the boulevard soon after its construction.

From 1863 to 1914, the boulevard functioned as a single-lane road that served the Lyon-Croix-Rousse station next to the upper station of the Rue Terme funicular. The station was relocated in 1914 north of the Place des Tapis.

== Monuments ==
- Collège de la Tourette, which was inaugurated 30 September 1879 by Jules Ferry, is located on the boulevard.
- Clos Jouve, one of the largest boules playing surfaces in Lyon and among the oldest in France, is located along the boulevard.
- Gros Caillou (large rock), is one of the symbols of the neighborhood.

== Events ==
- The Marché de la Croix-Rousse (Croix-Rousse Market) extends for about 1 km along the boulevard every week from Tuesday to Sunday.
- The Vogue des Marrons fair takes place along the boulevard every autumn.
- There is a Christmas market (Village de Noël) in December each year at the Place de la Croix-Rousse, which is adjacent to the boulevard.

== Accessibility ==
The street is serviced by metro station Croix-Rousse. There is a Vélo'v station at the metro entrance.

== See also ==
- List of streets and squares in Lyon
