= Les Subsistances =

Coordinates: 45°46′05″N 4°49′01″E

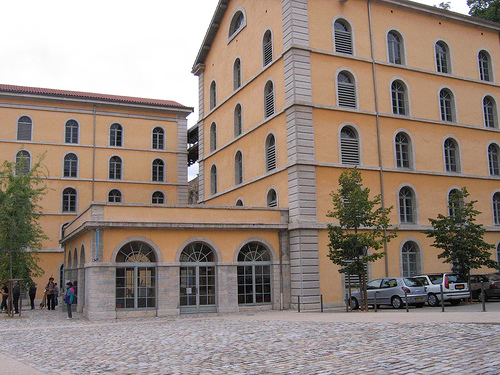
- Interactive map of the Les Subsistances area

General information
- Type: Theater
- Location: 1st arrondissement of Lyon, Lyon, France
- Current tenants: Les Subsistances
- Inaugurated: 2001
- Owner: City of Lyon

Website
- www.les-subs.com

Les Subsistances is a cultural centre of diffuse artistic production and located in the 1st arrondissement of Lyon. Since 2007, it has housed a creative laboratory (theater, dance and contemporary circus) and the École nationale des beaux-arts de Lyon. The site has 22,500 square metres of buildings (including 8,300 square meters of renovated surface) and 16,000 square meters of land, and is partly classified as monument historique. The director of Les Subsistances is Guy Walter, and the vice director is Cathy Bouvard.

== History ==
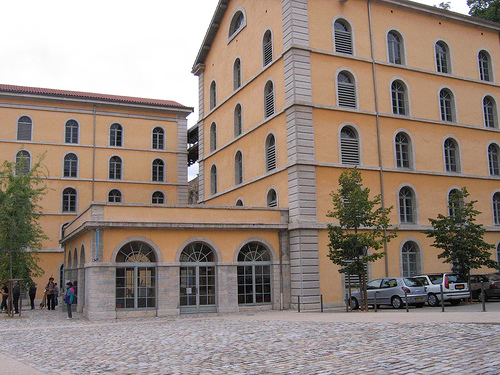
The music conservatory

In 1640, the Sisters of the Order of the Visitation of Holy Mary acquired the current site of the quay of the Saône, and built a small monastery and a church. The assembly then formed the convent of Sainte-Marie des Chaînes, so named because the customs had chains across the Saône to thwart smugglers who wanted to enter in Lyon by river. To address the lack of space and the influx of younger sisters, the decision was made to build a larger monastery. The newly constructed building collapsed before being rebuilt, which aggravated the financial situation of the convent. In 1789, it was declared national property, and the nuns were expelled in 1791 during the French Revolution.

In 1807, the army seized the site, which was transformed into a storage center and military camp. In 1840, the army built the large square, then called Manutention Sainte-Marie des Chaînes. Flour and bread were manufactured there; coffee, tobacco and wine were stored there until 1991. In 1870, a metal canopy was built over the central courtyard. Three flour mills were built, in 1853, 1870, and 1890, and a bakery. In 1941, the site was occupied by the army, and until 1995 it was called Military Subsistances.

In 1995, the site was given to the city of Lyon. The building has been renovated several times since 1997. It now houses a laboratory for creation and, since March 2007, the École Nationale des Beaux-Arts de Lyon (about 9,000 square metres). From May 1998 to December 1999, the place welcomed about fifty companies, and 309 performances.

In November 1999, the site was closed for a year for a renovation by Denis Eyraud, and was inaugurated on 26 January 2001. The buildings formerly used as mills now serve as administration spaces, and the old bakery was transformed into a 120-seat theater. A hangar was built with removable bleachers with a capacity of between 260 and 800 spectators. The most beautiful space, La Verrière, can host up to 2000 spectators. The other buildings are composed of seventeen rooms and residence studios, eight workshops, and the restaurant Quai des Arts.

== Administration ==
Paul Grémeret was appointed director in May 1998, succeeded by Klaus Hersche in September 2000. In 2003 Guy Walter and Cathy Bouvard became directors of Les Subsistances.

== See also ==
- List of theatres and entertainment venues in Lyon
