= Rue Lanterne =

Thoroughfare in Lyon, France

Coordinates: 45°46′00″N 4°49′54″E

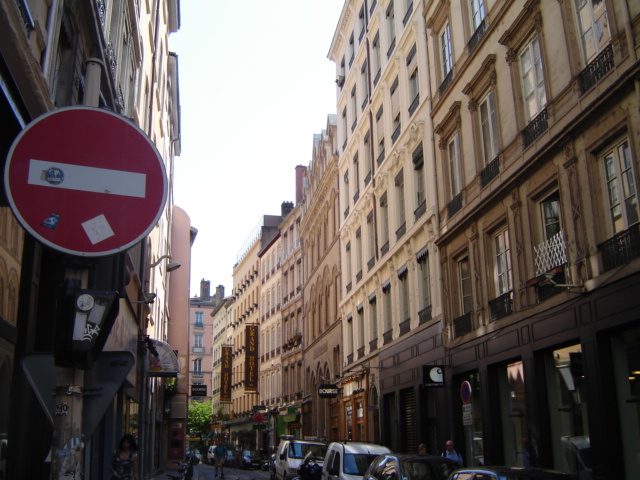
- Part of the street, just after the Rue d'Algérie
- Type: Street
- Location: 1st arrondissement of Lyon, Lyon, France
- Postal code: 69001

Construction
- Construction start: Middle Ages

The Rue Lanterne (French pronunciation: [ʁy lɑ̃tɛʁn]) is one of the oldest streets of Lyon, created in the Middle Ages, which is located in the 1st arrondissement of Lyon. It begins after the Rue d'Algérie and ends against a facade of the Rue Longue.

== History ==
The street was known in 1356. When the name Rue Lanterne appeared for the first time in the 16th century, only the central part was thus. Originally, the street was closed to the north by a door and was opened in the mid 19th century. In 1790, public executions were made in the street. Unlike other avenues of the neighborhood, the street has not been restructured by Prefect Claude-Marius Vaïsse. At the corner of a house, a bas-relief showed a lion with a lantern in its claws. In 1507, the pavement was decided. A shop sign took its name to the Rue de l'Enfant-qui-pisse, which was then the part between the Place de la Platière and the Rue Longue and was included to the Rue Lanterne in 1846.

A statue of a child urinating poured wine during certain feasts. In 1612, then in 1734, the butchery of the street was destroyed by fire. Famous establishments include the inn of the Grand Chevalier and the Hôtel de L'Écu de France in the 18th century, and the night club Au Fort de Brissac in the 19th century. In 1867, a tombstone was found. The street was formed in its southern part in 1846 by including the Rue de l'Enfant-qui-pisse. It was also lengthened at north by absorbing part of the Rue de la Boucherie des Terreaux, under the reign of Louis Philippe. The houses bore names such as L'Urne aux Roses (No. 15) or À la Toison d'Or (No. 24).

In the street lived many famous goldsmiths, painters and surgeons, as well as Alphonse Daudet for a while. In the past, at the architural level, there was a bust of a Roman emperor at No. 11, and a medallion with a lamb hanging from a chain above the door at No. 24.

== Architecture and associations ==
The street starts with big 19th century buildings, then the great door of the Hall of the Terreaux, whose traboule is open only for major events. After the Rue Constantine, there are several houses from different eras with carved doors.

Throughout time, there were old shop signs of inns and apothecaries. Today, there are primarily restaurants, but also the Hot Club de Lyon at number 26 (since 1981), which is the first gallery devoted to jazz in France. Among the major monuments, there are the four-star Grand Hôtel des Terreaux at number 16, with its beautiful stained glass, and the neogothic styled temple at number 10, built between 1855 and 1857, and currently used by the Cultural Association of the Reformed Church of Lyon Terreaux.

The straight traboule at No. 4 is blocked up and composed of conventional bourgeois building of 19th century. The curved traboule at No 29 is also blocked up, starts with a high stone ground-floor, a wide door with an open transom and a traditional hammer, crosses three buildings, and ends at No. 20 rue Paul Chenavard.

At No. 8, the architecture, linked to Romanticism, is characterized by a diversity and richness of decorative programs and a variety of sources of inspiration.
