= 1st arrondissement of Lyon =

- Municipal arrondissement
- The city hall of the arrondissement in 2026.

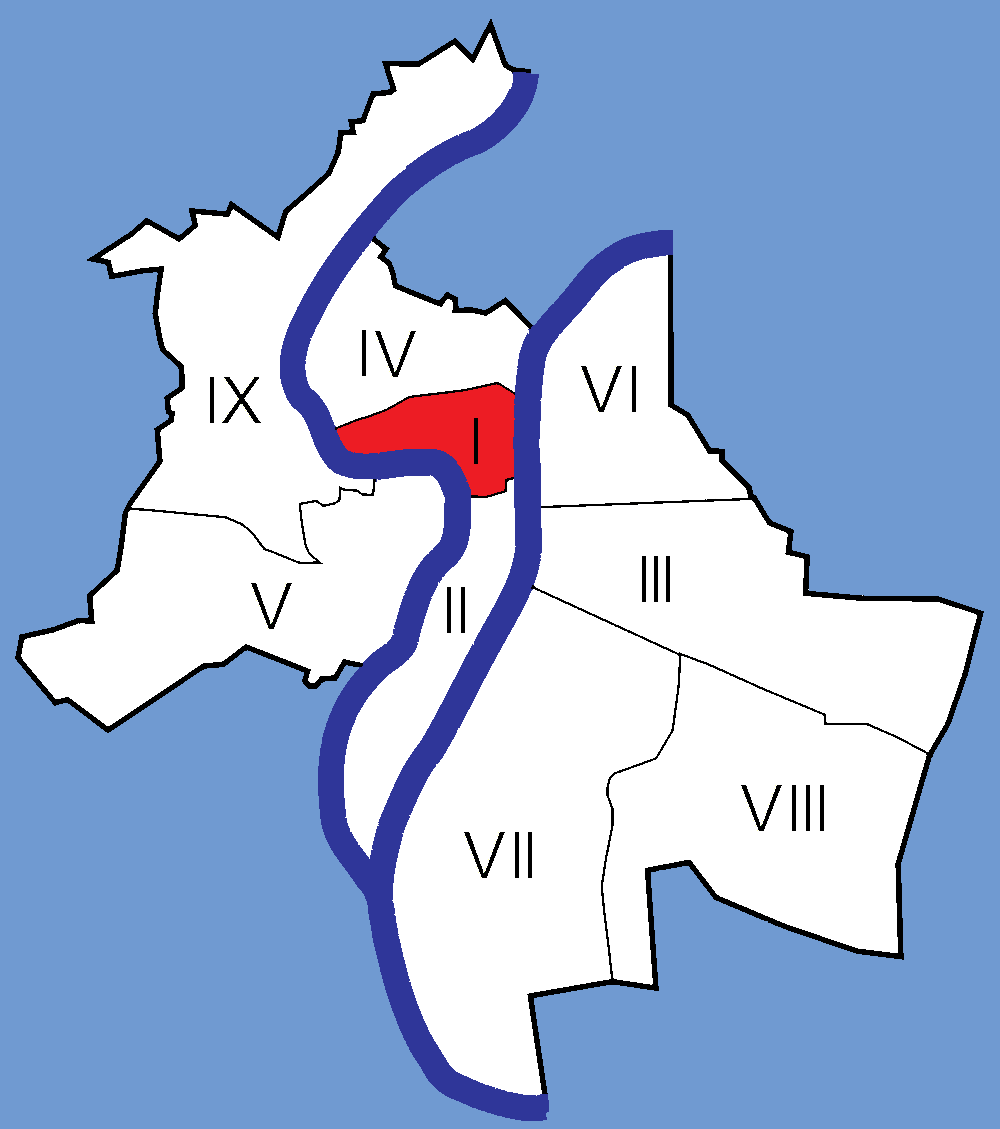
- Location within Lyon
- Coordinates: 45°46′7″N 4°50′1″E
- Country: France
- Region: Auvergne-Rhône-Alpes
- Department: Lyon Metropolis
- Commune: Lyon

Government
  - Mayor (2020–2026): Yasmine Bouagga
- Area: 1.51 km^{2} (0.58 sq mi)
- Population (2023): 28,717
  - Density: 19,000/km^{2} (49,300/sq mi)
- INSEE code: 69381

The nine arrondissements of Lyon

Arrondissements of Lyon

The 1st arrondissement of Lyon (French: 1^{e} arrondissement de Lyon) is one of the nine arrondissements of the City of Lyon. It is located below the hill of Croix-Rousse and on the north part of the Presqu'île formed by the Saône and the Rhône, the two rivers in Lyon.

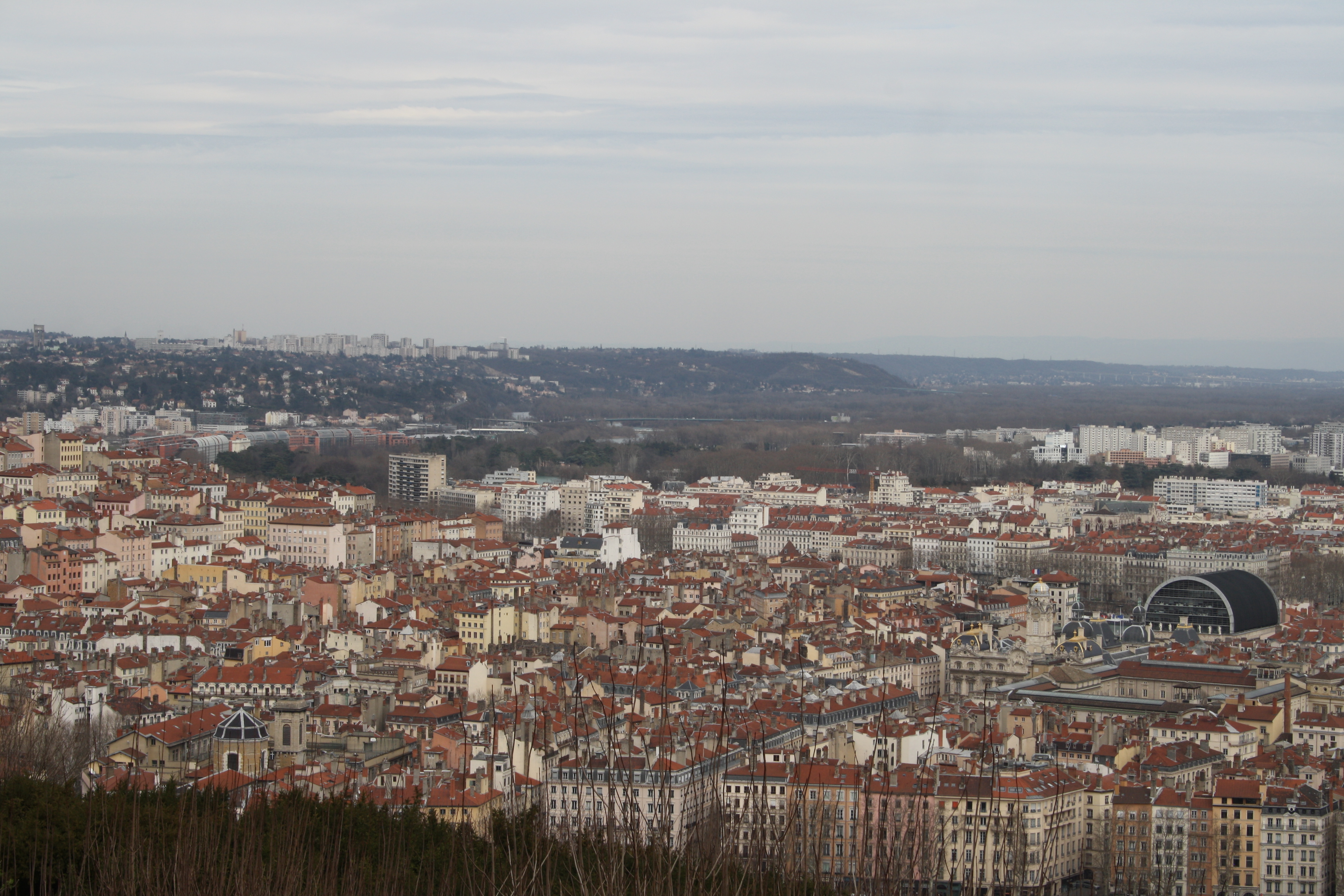
View of the 1st arrondissement of Lyon from the Fourvière hill

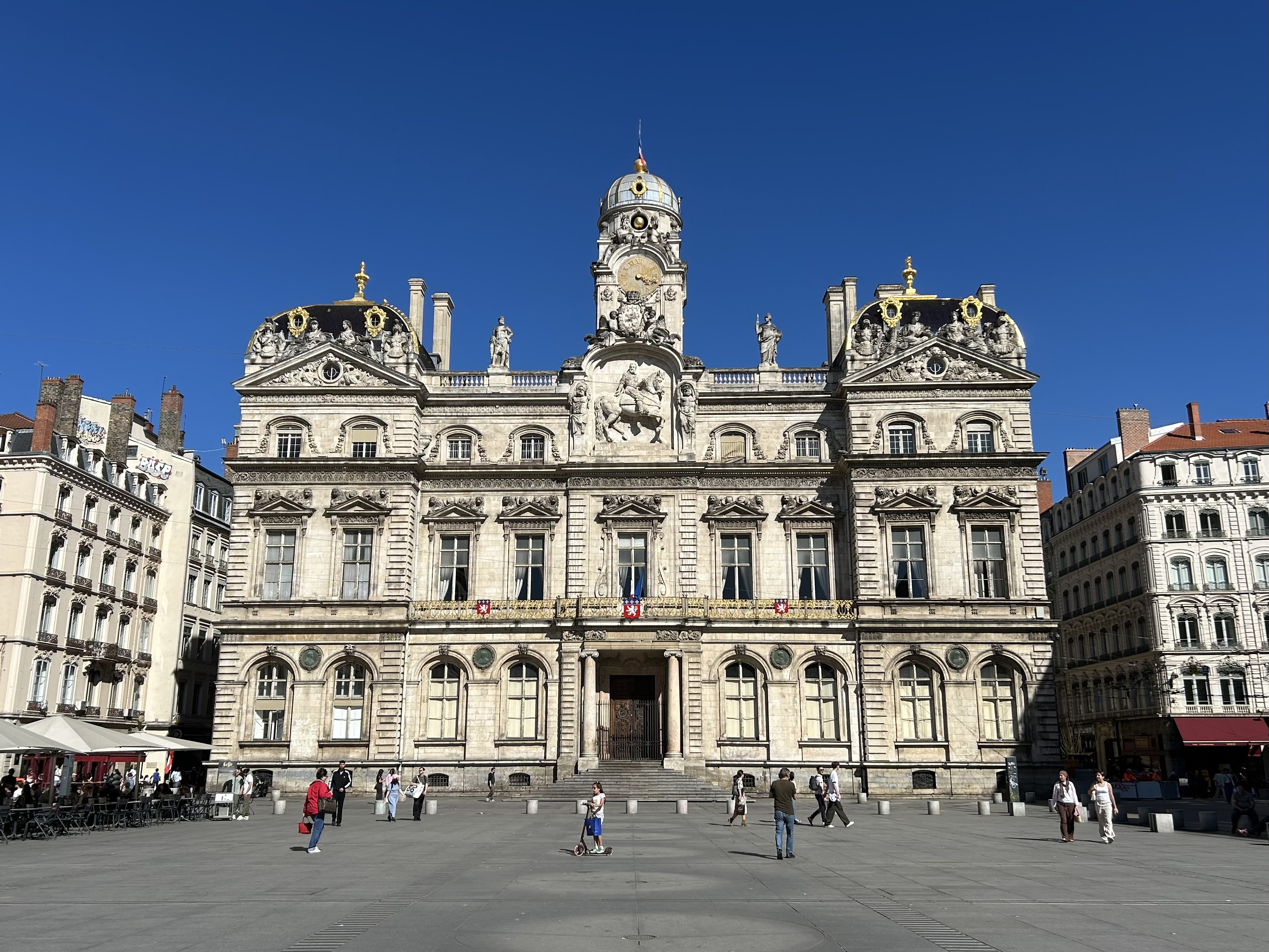
The Hôtel de Ville in 2026.

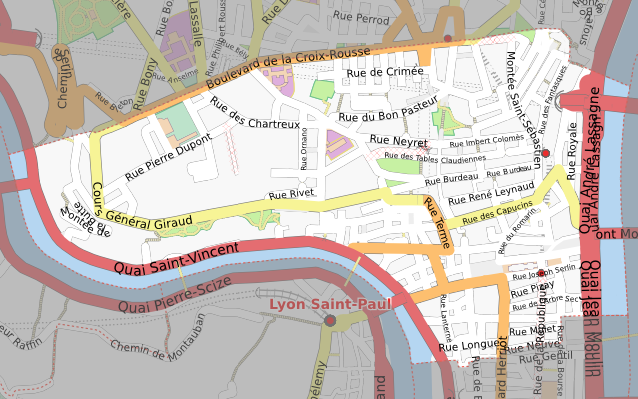
Map of the 1st arrondissement of Lyon

This zone is served by the metro lines and.

== History ==
Les pentes (the slopes Croix-Rousse, which were situated in the Franc-Lyonnais, are integrated to the city of Lyon since 1512, when Louis XII decided to build a fortification on the top of the hill Saint-Sébastien (name of Croix-Rousse in the Middle Ages) to defend the city.

The arrondissement was created 24 March 1852 (also the date of the creation of the 5 first arrondissements).

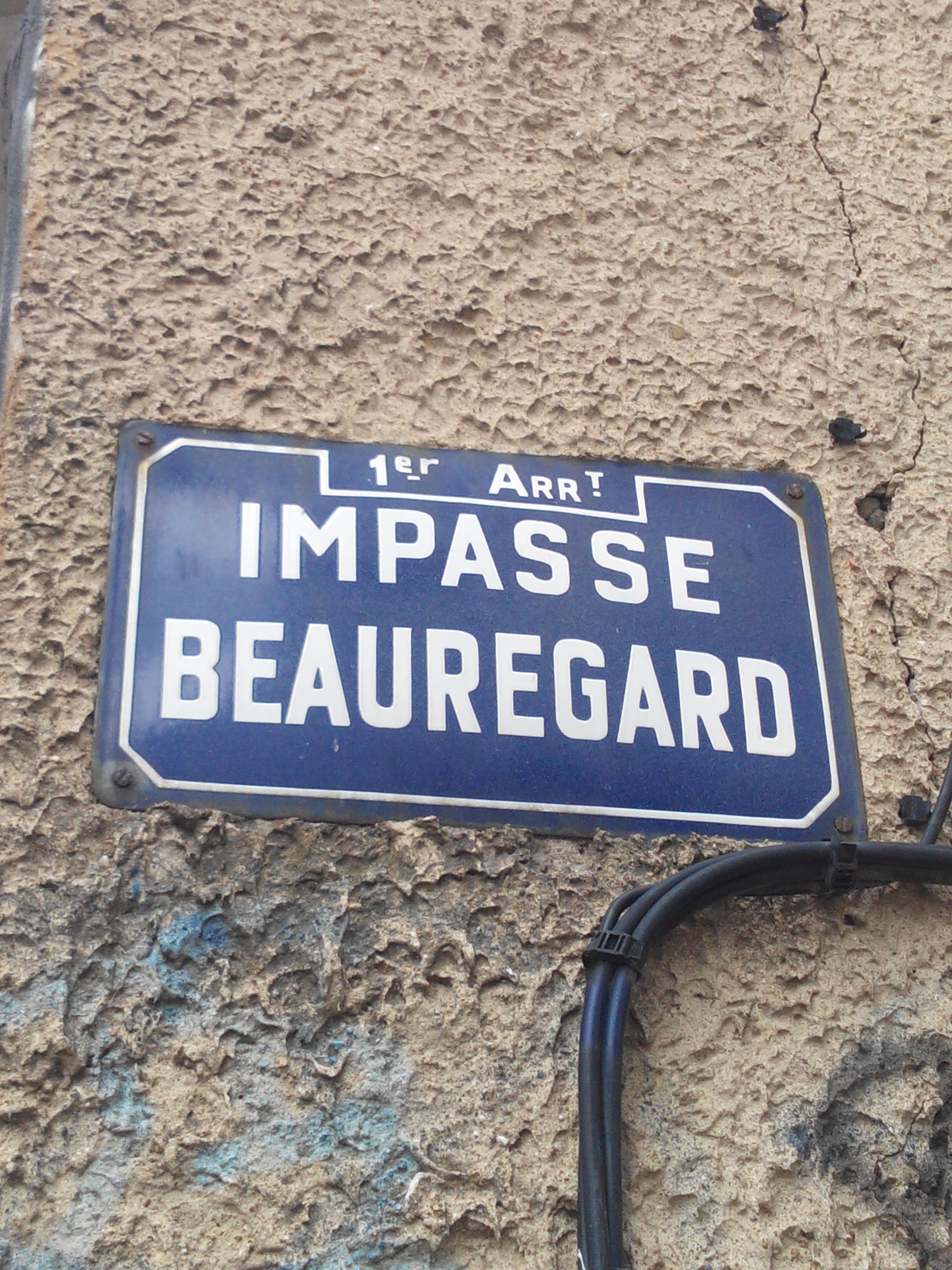
A street sign in the 1st arrondissement.

== Geography ==
=== Area and demographics ===
Located in the centre of the presqu'île, the 1st arrondissement is the smallest of all the arrondissements de Lyon. Around the place des Terreaux, bars and pubs across the street make the 1st arrondissement one of the more animated the night and days.

- Area: 151 ha (370 acres)
- 1999: 26,861 inhabitants
- 2005: 28,100 inhabitants
- 2006: 28,210 inhabitants
- 2007: 30,024 inhabitants
- Density of 18,682 inhabitants per square kilometre (48,390/sq mi)

=== Quarters ===
The 1st arrondissement of Lyon is composed of four districts :

- Terreaux (around Place des Terreaux)
- Pentes de la Croix-Rousse
- Croix-Paquet
- Quartier Saint-Vincent

=== Streets ===
- Boulevard de la Croix-Rousse
- Cour des Voraces
- Montée de la Grande Côte
- Montée des Carmélites
- Passage Thiaffait
- Quai de la Pêcherie
- Quai Saint-Vincent
- Rue Burdeau
- Rue de l'Arbre-Sec
- Rue de la Bourse
- Rue de la République
- Rue des Capucins
- Rue du Bât-d'Argent
- Rue du Sergent Blandan
- Rue Édouard Herriot
- Rue Lanterne
- Rue Pierre DuPont, named for songwriter Pierre Dupont, born in Lyons 1821.
- Rue Royale
- Rue Sainte-Catherine
- Rue René Leynaud, named for the journalist, poet and Resistance fighter, born in Lyons in 1910.

=== Squares and areas ===
- Jardin des Chartreux
- Place de la Comédie
- Place Croix-Paquet
- Place Louis Pradel
- Place Sathonay
- Place des Terreaux

== Administration ==
The city hall is managed since 2001 by Nathalie Perrin-Gilbert (Parti socialiste).

== Monuments ==
- Lyon City Hall
- Palace St Pierre, with the Musée des Beaux-Arts
- Opéra de Lyon
- Patineur de César
- Les Subsistances
- Amphithéâtre des Trois Gaules
- Église du Bon-Pasteur
- Église Saint-Polycarpe
- Chapel of St. Clair, Lyon

== Equipments and services ==
- Lyon City Hall
- Lycée de la Martinière
- Salle Rameau
- Halles de la Martinière

== Transports ==
- Métro Ligne A Station served : "Hôtel de Ville–Louis Pradel"
- Métro Ligne C Stations served: "Hôtel de Ville–Louis Pradel" and "Croix-Paquet"

== Cultural activities ==
- Musée des Beaux-Arts de Lyon
- Opéra de Lyon
- Numerous café-théâtres are installed on the pentes de la Croix-Rousse

== See also ==
- Arrondissements of Lyon
- List of the streets in Lyon
