= Montée de la Grande Côte =

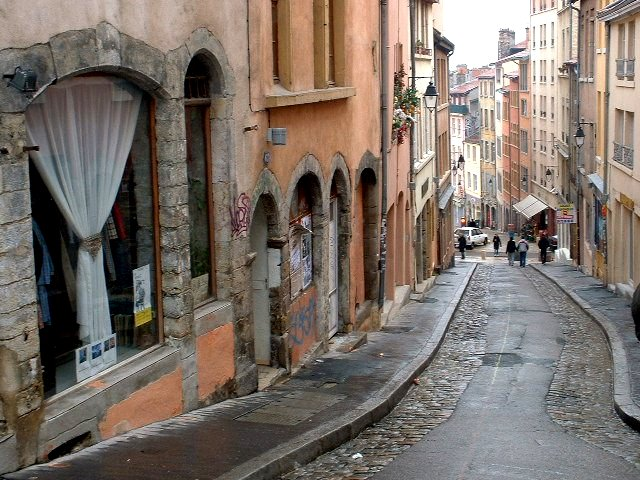
- View to the south
- Interactive map of Montée de la Grande Côte
- Location: 1st arrondissement of Lyon, Lyon, France
- Postal code: 69001
- Coordinates: 45.7716°N 4.8316°E

Construction
- Construction start: 16th century
- Completion: 20th century

The Montée de la Grande Côte, or the Montée de la Grande-Côte (French pronunciation: [mɔ̃te də la ɡʁɑ̃d kot]), is a street of La Croix-Rousse quarter, in the 1st arrondissement of Lyon, which connects the Terreaux quarter and the Plateau de la Croix Rousse. It is characterized by a high elevation and is more narrow at the bottom. The street belongs to the zone that is classified as World Heritage Site by UNESCO.

== History ==
In the Middle Ages, this street was still a country path already taken during the prehistoric times, bordered by agricultural land, including vineyards. The nuns of the desert bought the western part in 1296 and decided to change the route in a street several centuries later. It was urbanized in the 16th century. Then, from the 16th century, it became a major axis of entry and exit from the Presqu'île by the North since the Porte Saint-Sébastien or La Croix-Rousse. Thus, the street was originally called Grand'Côte Saint-Sébastien and Grand'Côte de La Croix-Rousse. The upper part of the street was named Pierres-Plantées named after the planted stones installed in this area to reduce the dangerousness of the street, thus providing an insurmountable physical constraint. In 1628, a small statue of Saint-Roch and a plaque in Latin, installed to indicate where the plague epidemic stopped, were added and finally removed after the French Revolution.

While the rest of the plateau and slopes of La Croix-Rousse were mainly composed of religious congregations, the Grand'Côte already hosted many canuts. In 1788, there were 705 looms. Their number increased with advancing urbanization of the slopes. The Grand'Côte became the crossing place of the workers who came down to Lyon, to the Capuchins, the district of merchants or Condition des soies). It was particularly taken by the demonstrators during the Revolt of Canuts on 21 November 1831 and 14 February 1834. In 1835, a cooperative store was established here long before the Rochdale movement in England and a plaque is now in the street stating: "Here was founded in 1835 by Michel Derrion and Joseph Reynier the French first cooperative of consumers." Today, the street continues to provide a typical example of a canuts street, although the upper part was restored.

The road surface was changed in 1855 to provide a sanitary sewer. From 1854 to 1930, the Rue des Pierres Plantées was incorporated to the Montée de la Grande Côte. In 1895, the young Marius Berliet developed his first car, called the Pantoufle in the homestead of La Croix-Rousse; trials were held in the Montée de la Grande Côte, but the car ended up in the window of a butcher. In the last decades of the 20th century, a policy of urban renewal destroyed the upper part of the street and the adjacent islands (e.g., in 1975, all the houses at the top of the street were demolished), creating a visible hole in the quarter.

Some sections are currently exclusively pedestrian. The upper part was transformed: staircases, gardens and an esplanade offering a view over the city. The part between the Rue des Tables Claudiennes and the Rue Burdeau is the only one to have kept its original width.

== Architecture ==
The more interesting architecture of the street, composed of beautiful doorways and arches, can be found in the southern part of the street. At the north of the Rue Imbert Colomès, there are canut-styled buildings of the 19th century and four buildings of the 1970s. Then, before the Rue des Tables Claudiennes, there are a 20th-century school and two old houses. Before the Rue Burdeau, there are two-floor houses, and before the Rue Leynaud, a six-floor public housing replacing houses before 1988, and a covered parking; beyond, the street is more narrow and lined with a large variety of old houses. To the east, there are old two to four-floor houses, the oldest of them built in the early 16th century.

At No. 2, there was a Roman sculpture. At No. 89-90, there was a statue of a Madonna and Child, but the child disappeared in 1902 and the Virgin five years later. At No. 100, the mullioned windows were created in the 13th century. Sidewalks were added in 1859.

The houses are classified as World Heritage Site.

The Grand'Côte gave its name to the Littré de la Grand'Côte, a dictionary about the Lyon speaking written by Nizier of Puitspelu (a.k.a. Clair Tisseur).

== Traboules ==
There are several traboules in the street:

- Nos. 9, 11, 13: This is an open traboule which crosses four buildings, with central courtyard and stairs. There is the 1986 residence of André Dupasquier, with a kindergarten, the terrace of the famous cafe Le Montana and restaurant Tête à Claps just before. To give the place a neo-Roman style, a fountain was scheduled at the top of the stairs.
- No. 69: This curved traboule is open. There are, among other things, a small old house, a large courtyard with walls painted, a troglodyte flat and a glass door.

== Photos ==
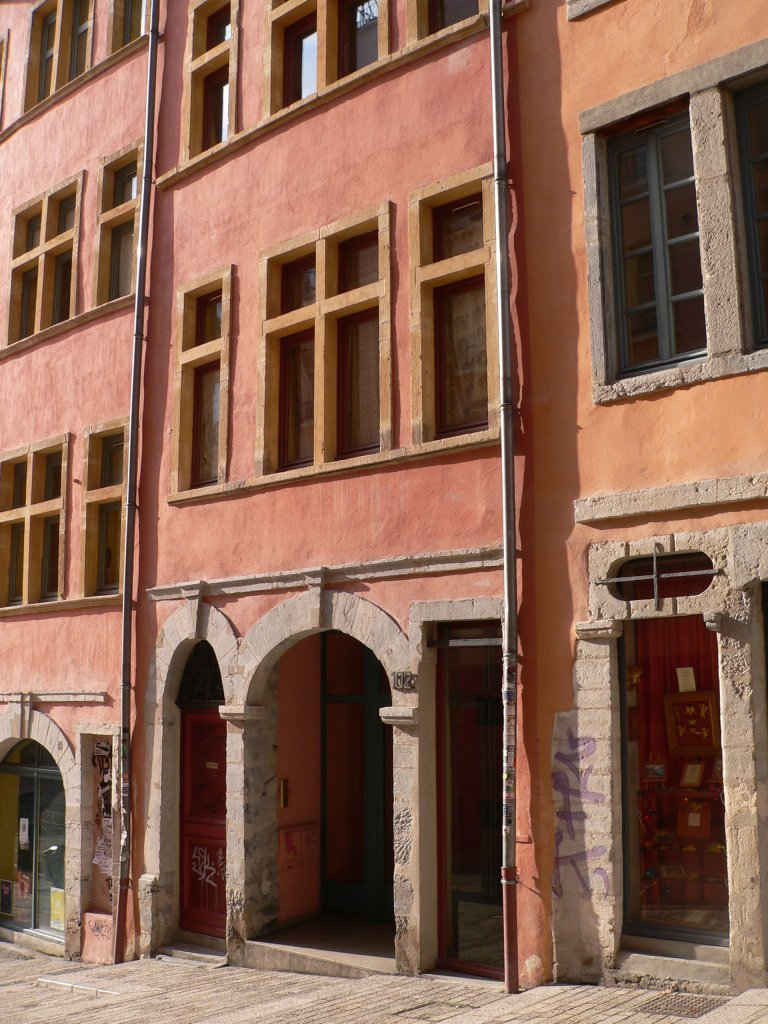
Old building

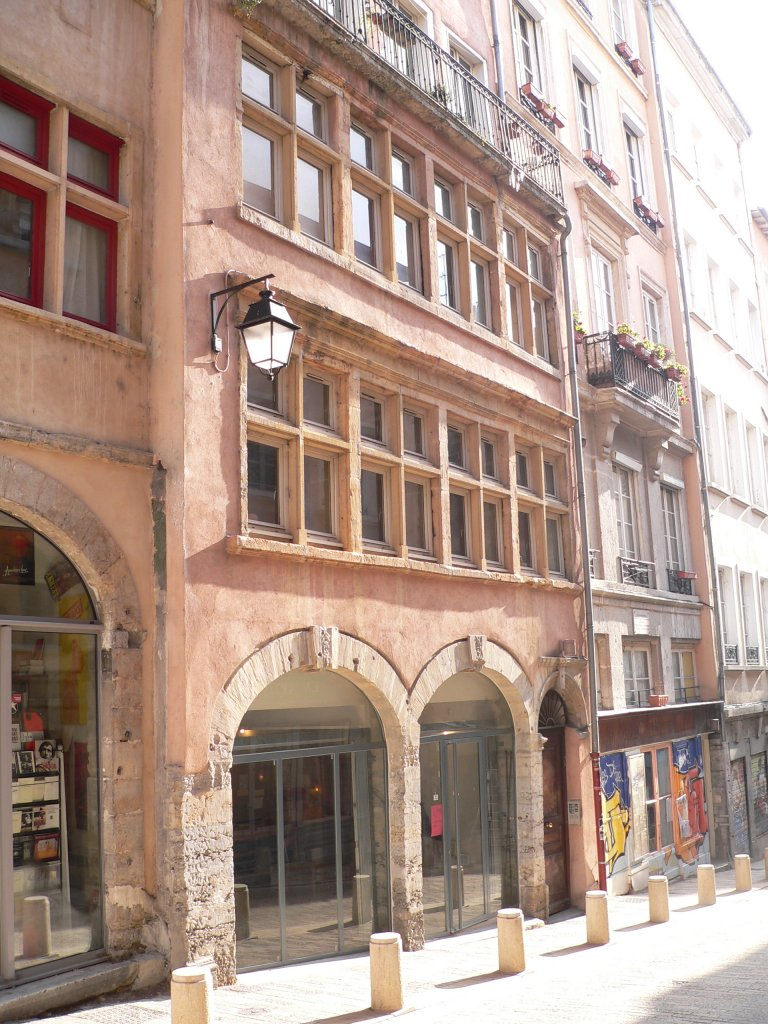
Mullioned windows - Beginning of the Montée de la Grande Côte

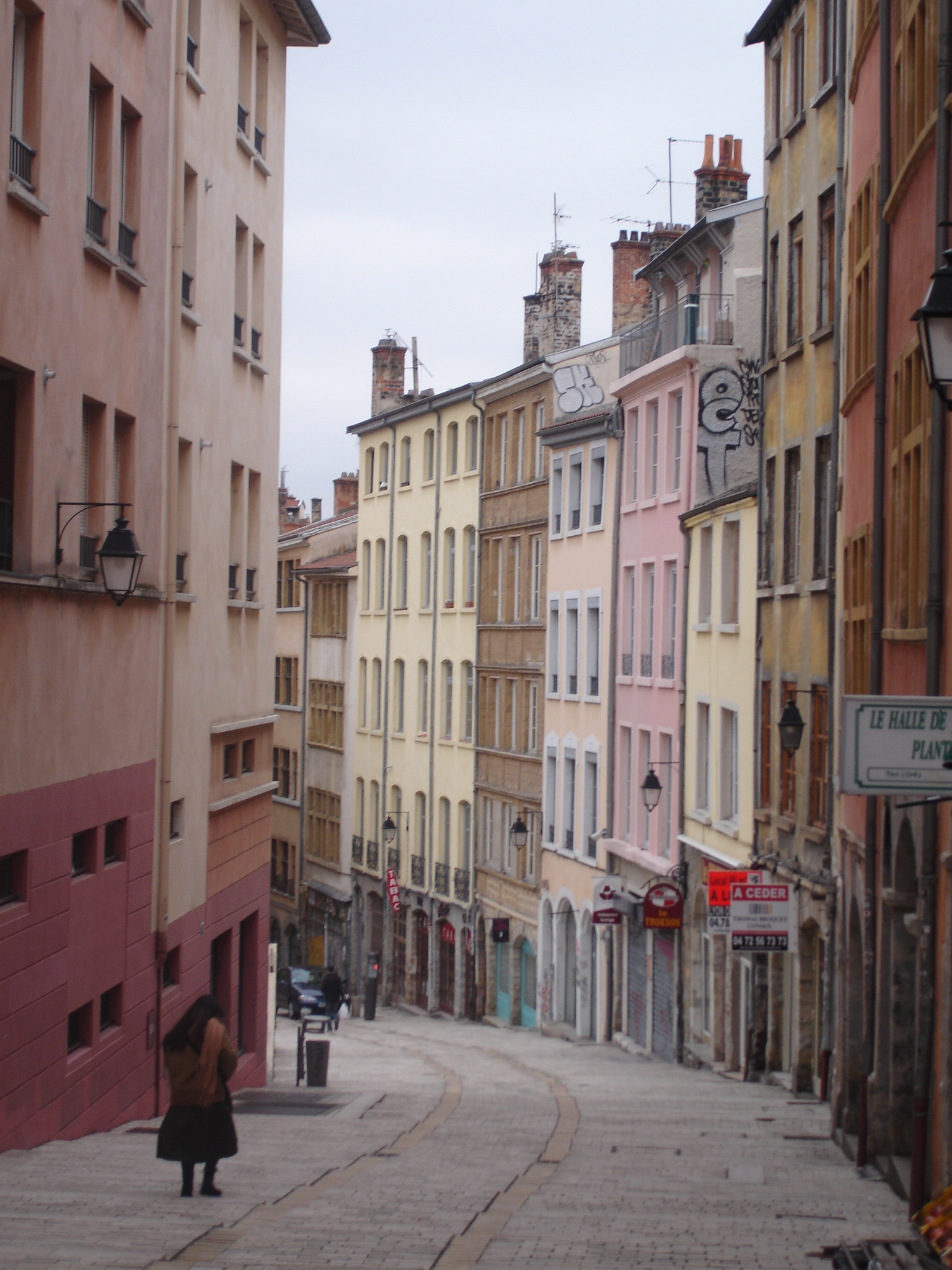
The lowest part of the street

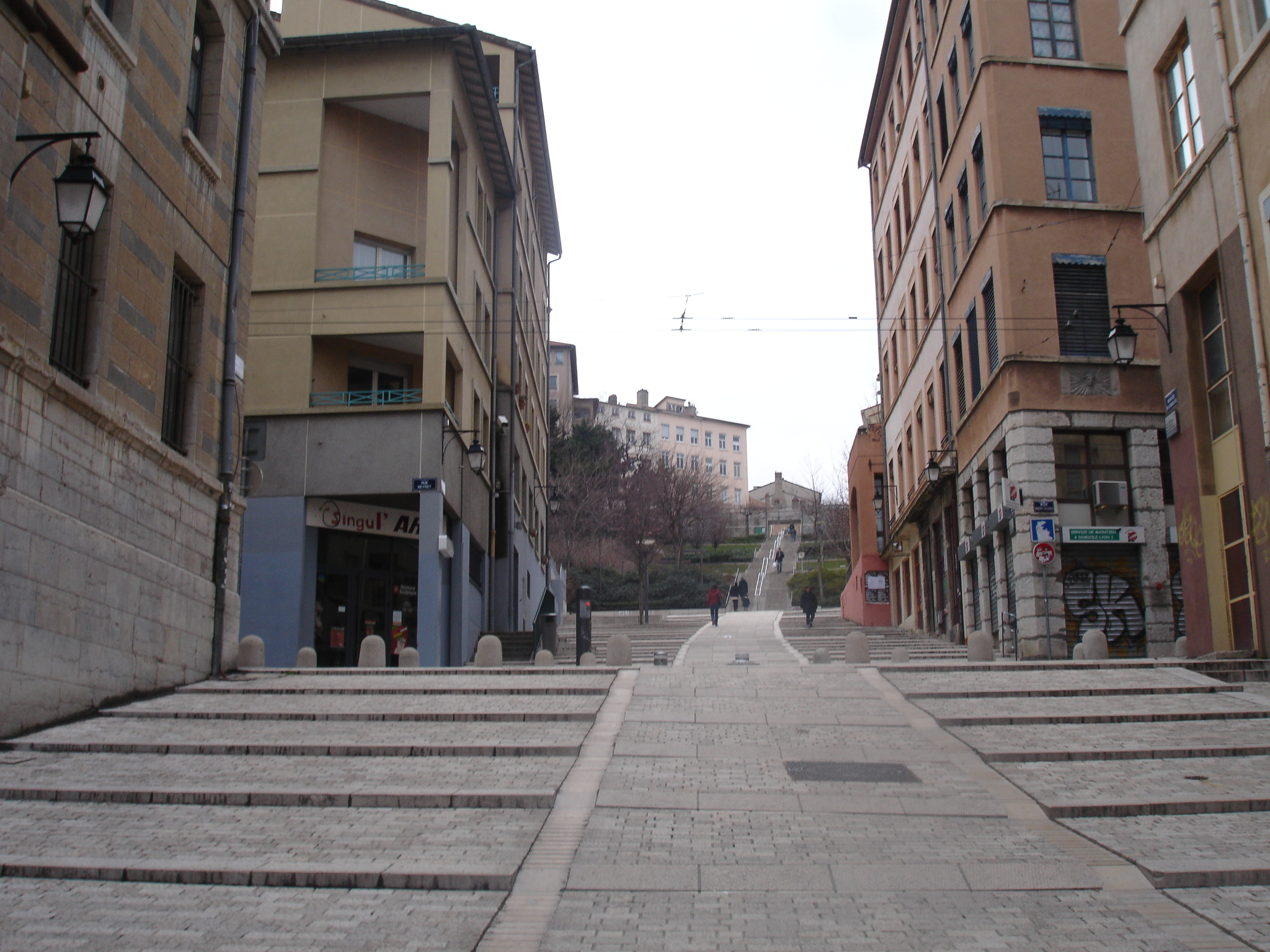
The street viewed from its low part
