= La Croix-Rousse =

Hill in Lyon, France

Coordinates: 45°46′46″N 4°49′39″E

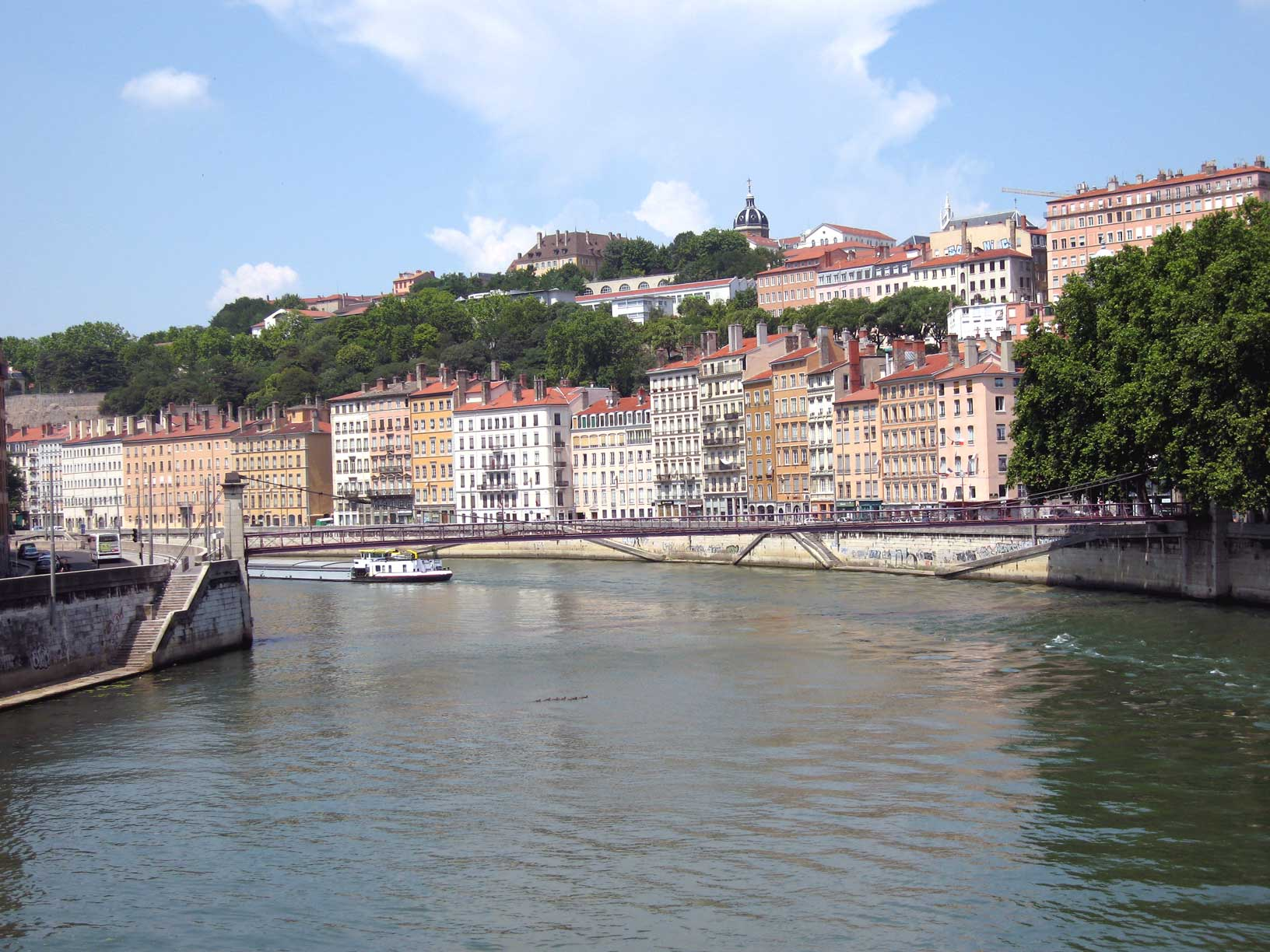
La Croix-Rousse

La Croix-Rousse (French: [la kʁwa ʁus]) is a hill 254 metres (833 ft) high in the city of Lyon, France, as well as the name of a neighborhood located on this hill. The neighborhood is divided into les pentes (slopes, belonging to the city's 1st arrondissement) and le plateau (atop the hill, part of the 4th arrondissement). This zone is served by Lyon Metro Line C. With 18th century architecture, including unique dwellings for labourers, La Croix-Rousse was inscribed on the UNESCO World Heritage List in 1998 (along with other districts in Lyon) to protect Lyon's long history as an important European city.

== Names and etymology ==
The name "La Croix-Rousse" ('the russet/red cross') comes from a reddish-brown stone cross erected there in the 16th century.

In Lyon, La Croix-Rousse is nicknamed la colline qui travaille ('the hill that works') in contrast to the better-known hill to the southwest, Fourvière, which is known as la colline qui prie ('the hill that prays').

== History ==
The district started developing in the 18th century when the silk workshops moved here from the Vieux-Lyon area. The canuts (silk workers) were subject to extremely poor working conditions. On account of these conditions, they staged many worker uprisings, known as the Canut revolts. The first revolt, in October 1831, is considered to be one of the first worker uprisings. The area was immortalized in Paul-Jacques Bonzon's book series Les Six Compagnons, which depicts the adventures of seven young working-class teenagers from the area.

The appearance of the neighborhood is heavily influenced by the central role that Lyon played in the silk industry in France. The vast majority of buildings in the area feature large vaulted ceilings with exposed wooden rafters. The larger internal height available in these buildings, compared to other areas in Lyon, was necessary for housing the tall silk looms that were operated in the area. Also of note are the traboules of Croix-Rousse. These are covered passageways used by silk merchants to travel and ferry material between buildings while being sheltered from rain.

The area has since been subject to gentrification, and now exhibits a vibrant cultural scene. La Croix-Rousse has always possessed a unique atmosphere compared to the rest of the city. As an illustration, some inhabitants call themselves Croix-roussiens.

== In popular culture ==
The action of Lofi Girl takes place in the Croix-Rousse. The idea comes from the several years of studies of the creator Juan Pablo Machado at Lyon.

== See also ==
- Boulevard de la Croix-Rousse
- Canut (silkworkers)
- Canut revolts
- Gros Caillou

== Bibliography ==
- Domenico Pucciarelli, Le rêve au quotidien, de la ruche ouvrière à la ruche alternative, les expériences collectives de la Croix-Rousse, 1975-1995, Atelier de création libertaire, Lyon, 1996.
- Le Monde, A Lyon, la Croix-Rousse demeure un quartier rebelle, 01/08/2003
- Jean Pelletier : Connaître son arrondissement – le 4ème, éditions lyonnaises d’art et d’histoire, ISBN 2-84147-043-1
- Louis F. Lacroux, La Croix-Rousse en flânant, Éditions Xavier Lejeune
- Bernard Collonges, Le quartier des Capucins - Histoire du bas des pentes de la Croix-Rousse, éditions Aléas, septembre 2004, 115 p., ISBN 2-84301-100-0
- Josette Barre, La colline de la Croix-Rousse, Éditions Lyonnaises d’Art et d’Histoire
