= Les Cordeliers =

Coordinates: 45°45′49″N 4°50′11″E

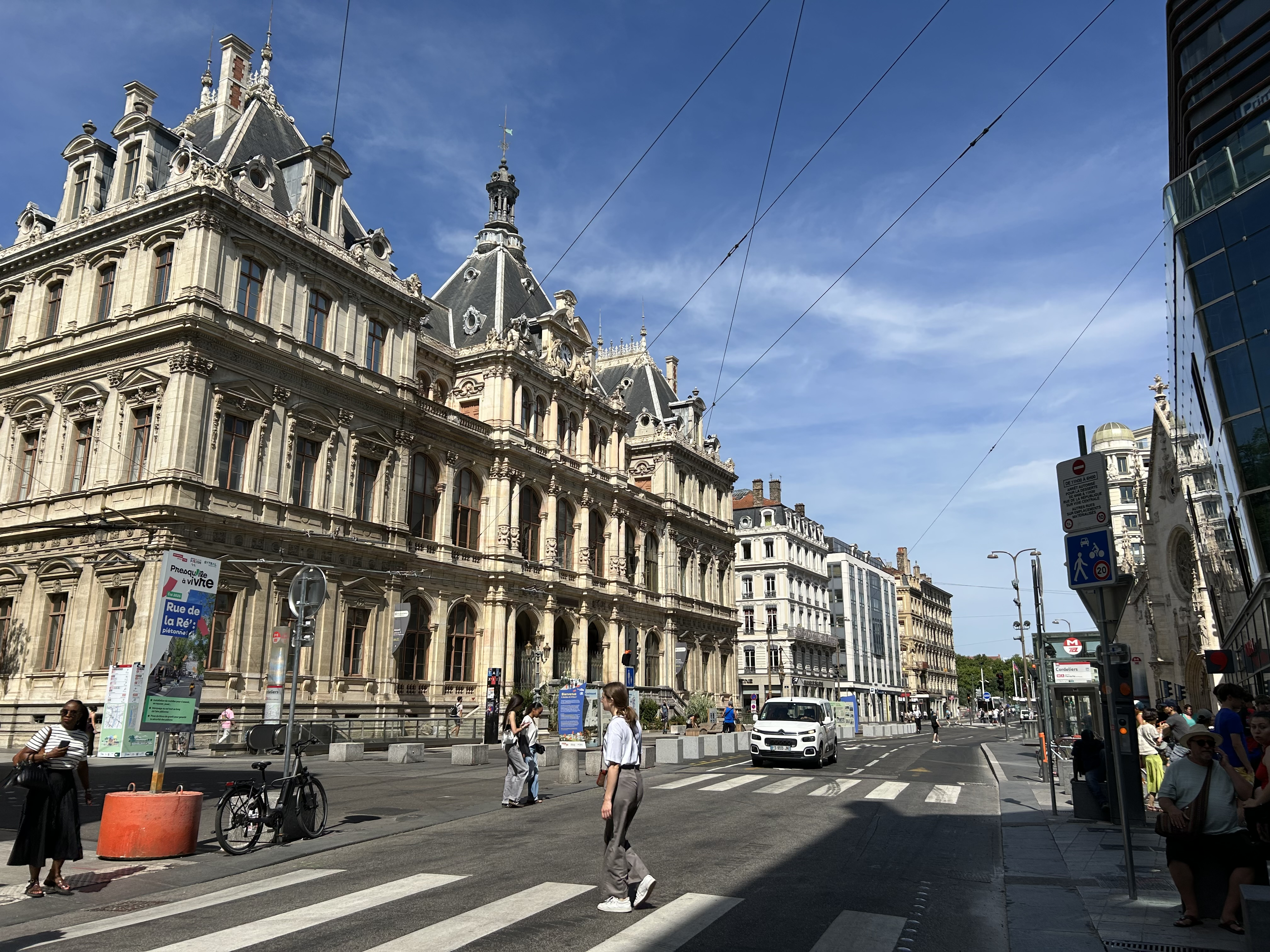
Cordeliers Square with its Palais de la Bourse in 2025.

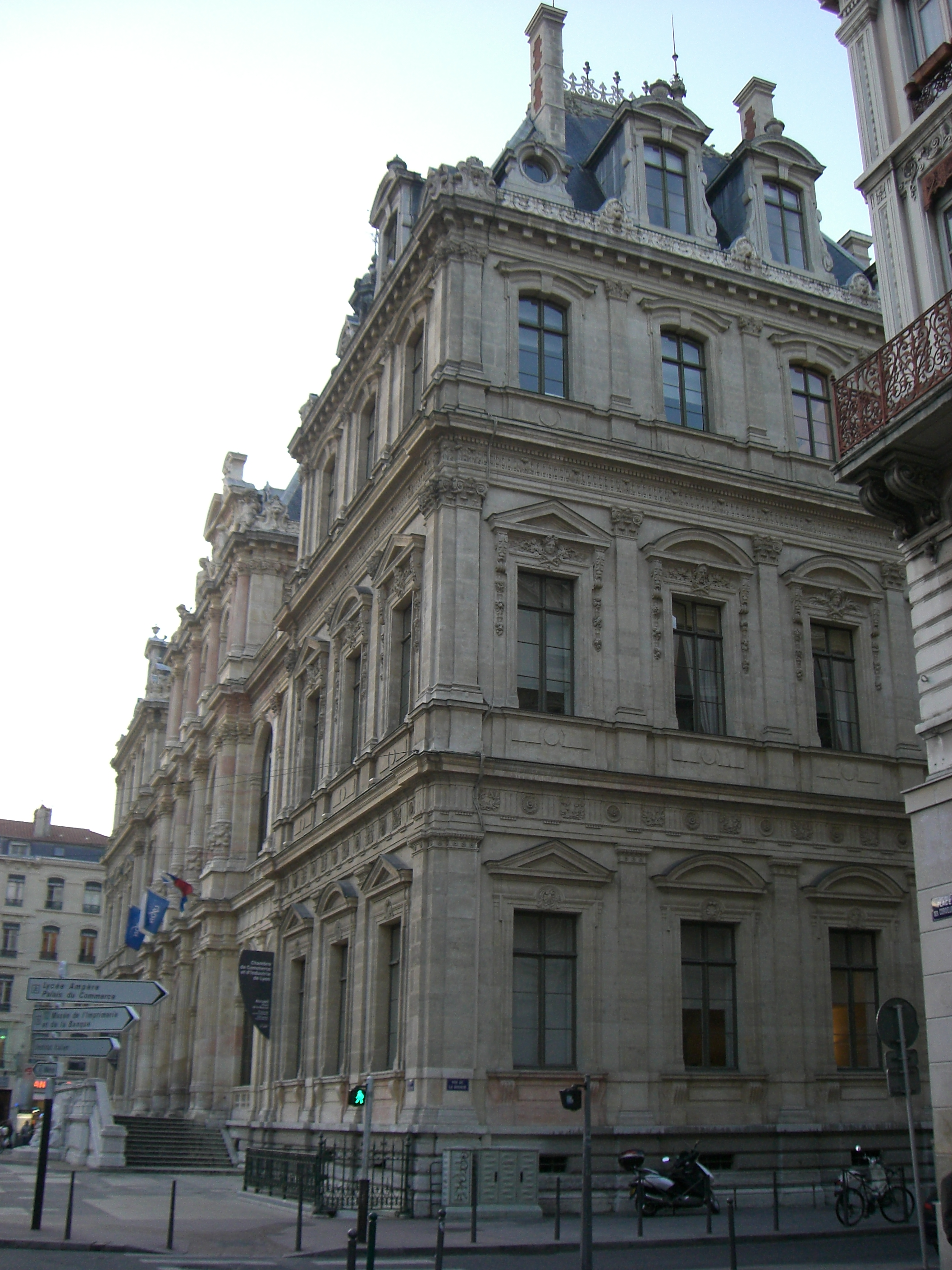
Palais de la Bourse, details of the south-east pavilion

Les Cordeliers (French pronunciation: [le kɔʁdəlje]) is one of the central quarters in the 2nd arrondissement of Lyon, France. It is mainly known for the Place des Cordeliers in its centre. Around the square, there are many notable monuments, including the Église Saint-Bonaventure and the Palais de la Bourse.

== Origin of the name ==
It is named after the convent of the Cordeliers, whose church only, named Saint-Bonaventure, was spared by the confiscation of church property by the State after the French Revolution. Les Cordeliers was the former name given in France to the religious order of the Frères Mineurs, also known as Franciscans of the Strict Observance, because of their knotted rope worn around the waist. They were also called Observantins to distinguish them from those who, following the discussions that were raised in the order, were not affected by the Capuchins and Recollects' reforms.

== History ==
=== Roman era ===
During the Roman era, the current quarter housed Canabae quarter's warehouses. Some signs of living conditions were found and occupation under the Lower Empire was discovered during the parking of the Exchange construction work in 1989 and 1990, Place de la Bourse. In early 1st century, a succession of occupation alternated with periods of floods. The first light structures can be dated from Tiberius' reign (14 - 37). Living conditions were attested from the middle of the 1st century to the early 3rd century.

=== Middle Ages ===
Like the rest of the city, the neighbourhood was deserted until the 11th century and the repopulation was related to the reconstruction of bridges on the Saône and the Rhône. The living conditions centre was around Saint-Nizier and the narrow streets crossed the Cordeliers quarter from east to west, including the Rue Ferrandière, Rue Thomassin, Rue Tupin and Rue de la Poulaillerie which testified to the existence of streets dedicated to certain crafts or leisure occupations : iron, poultry market, pottery (the tupiniers or the tupineis game, which was a sort of game of skill on horseback with an earthen jar filled with water). The quarter of Les Cordeliers was populated between the 11th and 14th centuries, although activity was slightly in the west, around the rue Mercière.

=== The convent of Les Cordeliers ===
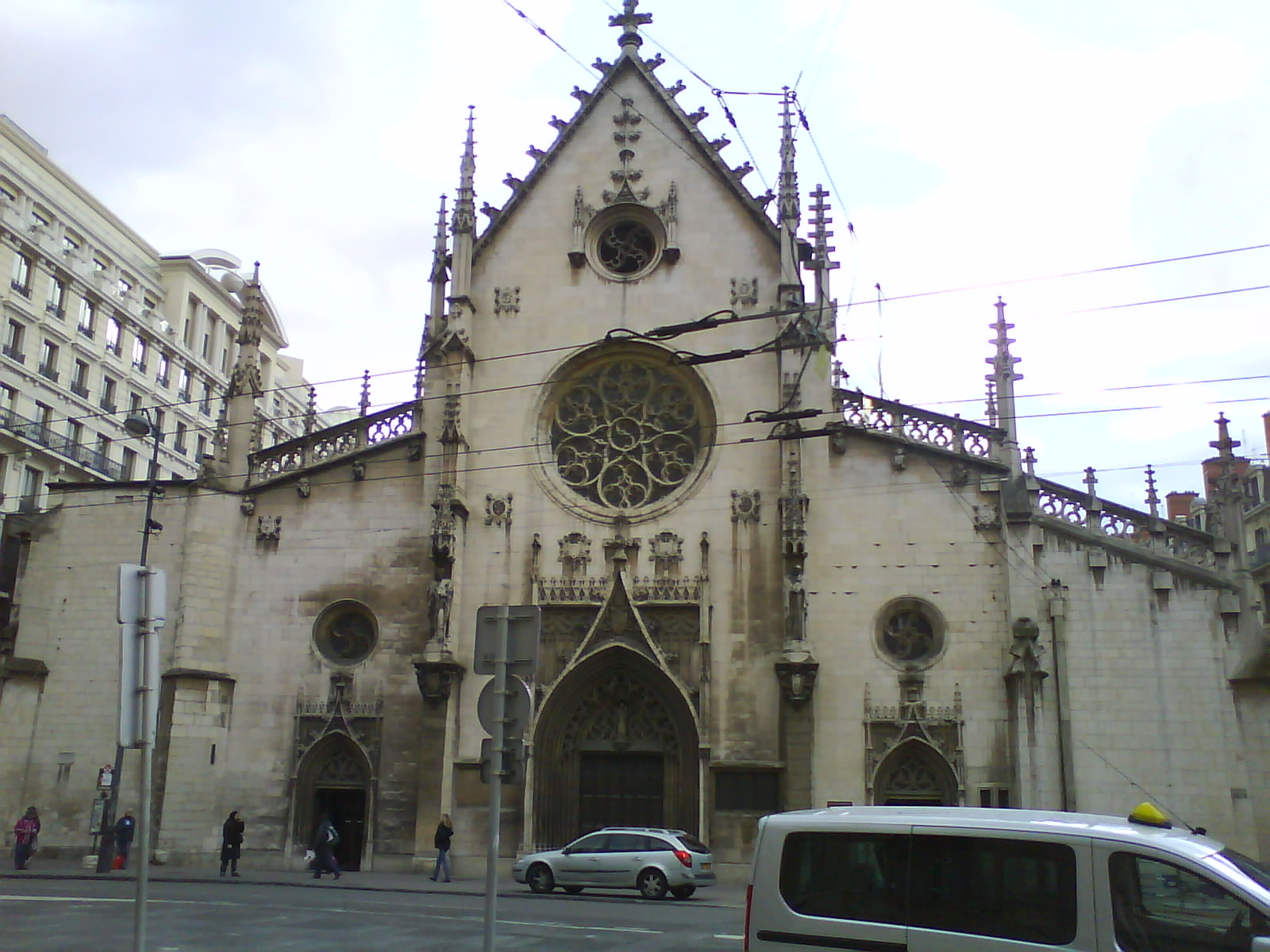
Église Saint-Bonaventure

The Franciscans, led by Guichard IV, Lord of Beaujeu, settled in Pouilly-le-Monial in 1210 and Vienne in 1212. Two of them left Villefranche (now Villefranche-sur-Saône) and received by seneschal Grolée a land in Lyon, located between the streets Grenette, Stella, Blancherie and the port Charlet on the Rhône. This concession was approved by Philip II Augustus' patent letter on 18 July 1220. This date remains generally for being the foundation of the monastery by the order of Franciscan friars. The first church, with small dimensions, was built with the seneschal's donations, near the port Charlet, along the rue Tabourin. Pope Honoré III approved the first work by a bull on 12 May 1224. Grolée gave part of his wealth to the new convent and wanted to be buried after his death (but the date is unknown). Three of his successors were buried in tombs neighboring, including Jacmus Grolée.

In 1274, the council composed of Pope Gregory X and Cardinal Bonaventure, praised for his humility and scholarship. At his death threshold, Bonaventure received the papal visit, which gave him the last rites. The church built by Grolée was too small to contain the coffin of the future saint. Jacques de Grolée, grand son of the seneschal and then dedicated to the service of Edward, Count of Savoy, began building the current church by laying the foundations of a church turned to the south. Two years were needed for building the church to the seventh span. The church was then named after Saint Francis of Assisi and was consecrated on 18 September 1328 by the archbishop of Lyon, Pierre IV of Savoy. The builder of Grolée Jacques died on 4 May 1327 and was buried at the foot of the altar (his body was moved in 1599). He built the church and gave religious revenues from lands on the street now named after him. Soon, the church became the headquarters of the corporations that built chapels : the merchants of Troyes in Champagne did build the chapel of Saint-Fortuné (or Saint-Fortunat) in 1345, the tailoring of clothes did build one dedicated to Saint-Joseph, hoteliers and taverns built that of Anthony of Padua in 1388, or "those who work in the art of silk" built that of Notre-Dame de l'Assomption. The church, now named Église Saint-Bonaventure, was extended from 1471 to 1484.

The convent and hospital buildings (including that of Les Cordeliers) and hospitals occupied nearly a third of the Presqu'île.

The dock on the Rhone was among the first built ones in Lyon from 1739 to 1745, between the convent of Les Cordeliers who owned a facade, and the Pont de la Guillotière. The south part of the convent was then named quai et port des Cordeliers.

=== The 1789 revolution ===
After the revolution of 1789, the convent of Les Cordeliers and the Église des Jacobins were destroyed (the church in 1808), but the Église Saint-Bonaventure was kept and the current facade was even added in the 19th century. Around 1850, Les Cordeliers remained a set of unsalubrious streets, whose average width was five metres.

=== Under the Second Empire ===
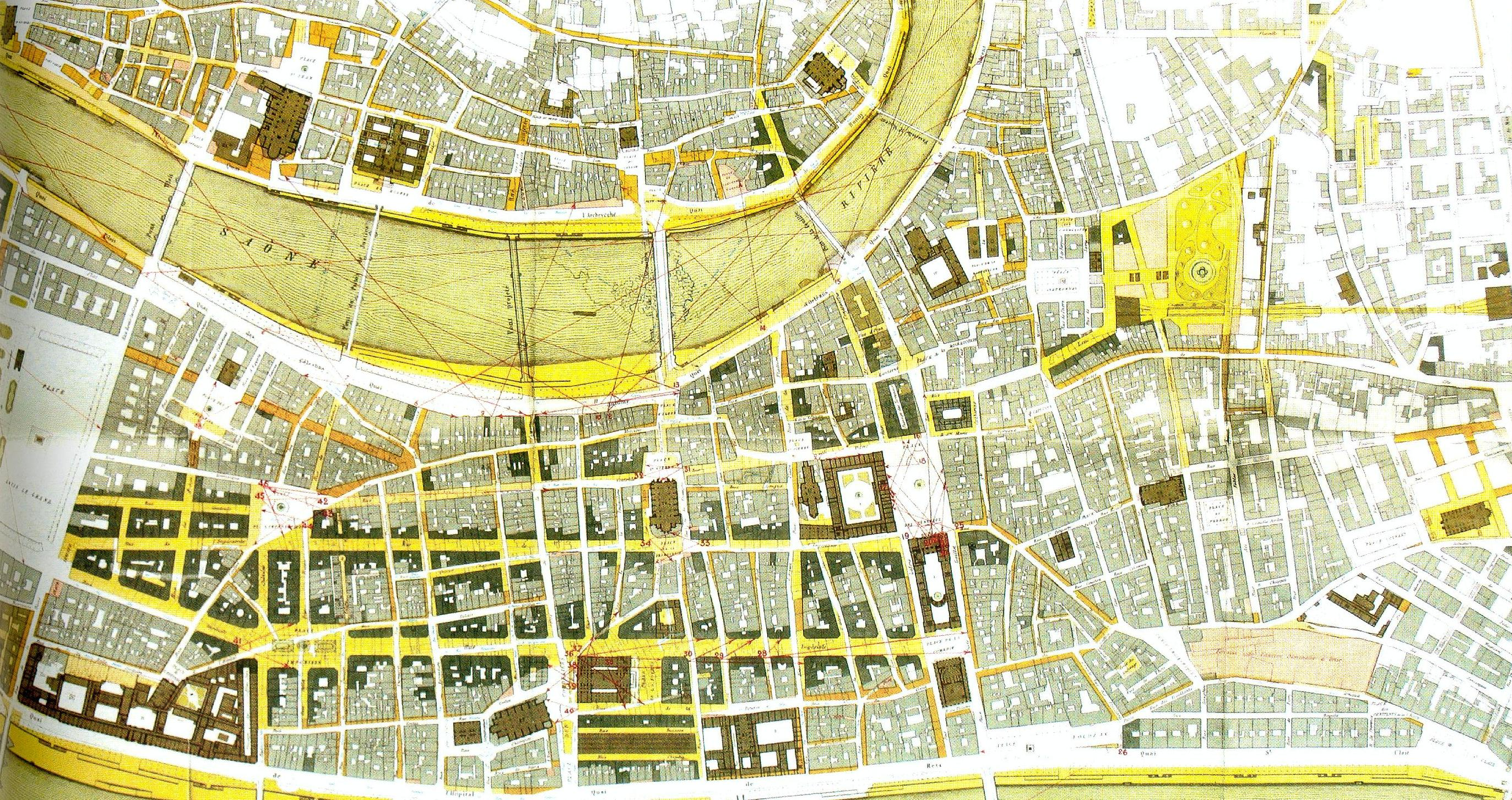
Plan of projects on the Presqu'île in 1863.

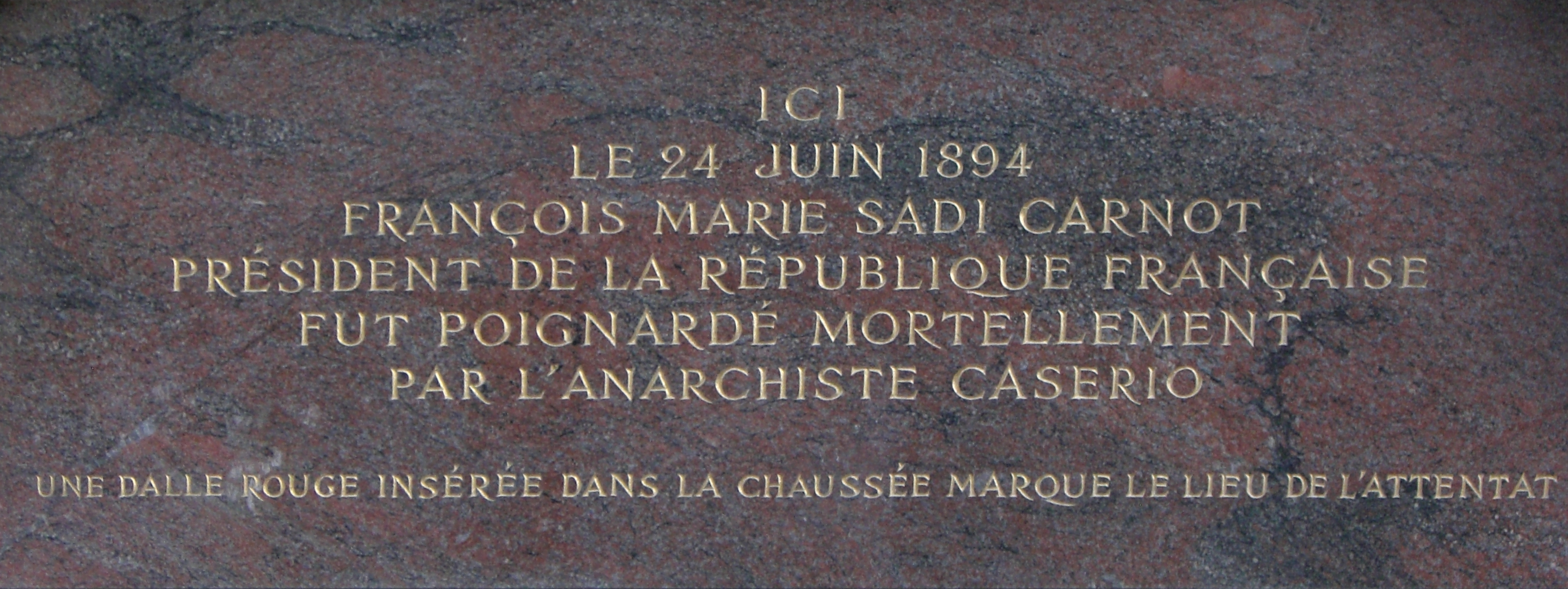
Commemorative plaque of Sadi Carnot's assassination.

During the Second Empire, hygiene became a concern of successive mayors. Like the great works overseen by Baron Haussmann in Paris, it was decided the construction of streets in the center of Lyon to prevent, among others, "the stagnant air, (...) main source of all diseases". The prefect Claude-Marius Vaïsse ordered this construction between 1853 and 1864 : the current rue de la République, which crosses Les Cordeliers quarter from north to south, was completed in 1862 and the Palais de la Bourse, built by René Dardel, was started in 1855 and inaugurated by Napoleon III and Eugénie de Montijo five years later. In the same time, halls moved between the new street and the Rhône, replacing the houses along the rue Stella.

=== Creation of Grolée quarter ===
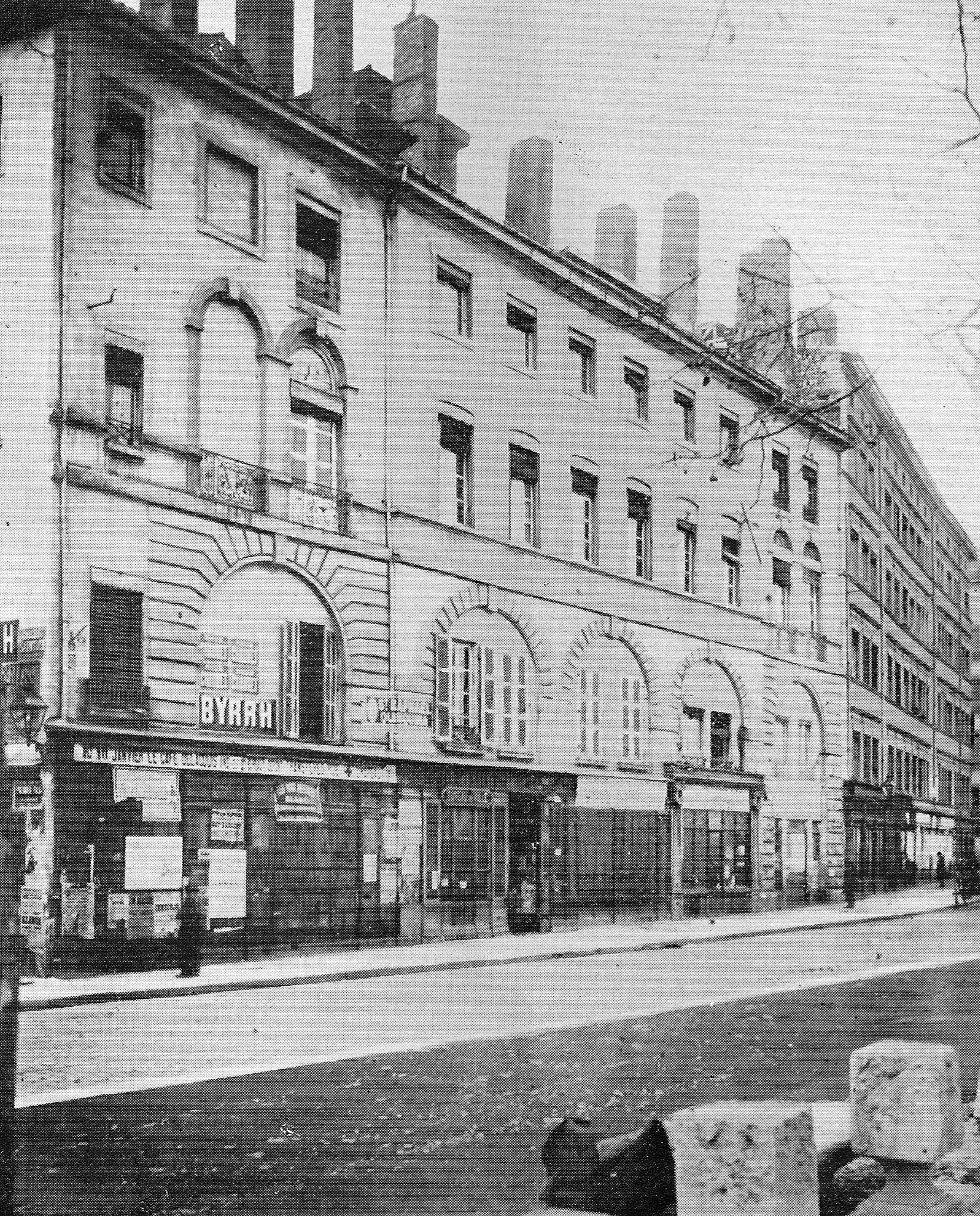
Facade of the convent of the Cordeliers on the Rhône, near 1880.

The Place des Cordeliers became one of the most important centers of the city. The Église of Saint-Bonaventure was flanked with the Galleries Lafayette and Le Grand Bazar. From 1887, the creation of the quarter Grolée was decided. Many stalls savetier crowded round the foothills of the Church. The streets at the rear of the building didn't exceed 2m wide and formed an unhealthy maze. Mayor Antoine Gailleton said : "(The quarter) has not yet had its part of transformations which, for a period of thirty years, have so powerfully contributed to give to our city an aspect of great city that suits it and which it must hold the first rank after the capital." Expropriations began in 1889. Except two large buildings on the Rhône and another one on the Place de la Republic, the current quarter was almost complete in 1894, then fully completed in 1908. In 1909, the tram took the central axis of the quarter, the current rue Carnot, which marked the tangible success of the quarter re-development.

=== 20th century ===
On 24 June 1894, Italian anarchist Sante Geronimo Caserio assassinated President Sadi Carnot in front of the Palais de la Bourse. A red stone on the floor of the rue de la République recalls the assassination. In May 1968, the square was the location of the clashes between the police and the students who took refuge in the church. In the 1970s, the halls of Lyon moved into the new quarter of La Part-Dieu. The metro was built in 1978 and the Grand Bazaar destroyed in 2005 and rebuilt in 2007.

== Notable monuments ==
- Grand Bazar : one of the major stores of Lyon center, demolished and replaced with a glass and metal building
- Église Saint-Bonaventure
- Palais de la Bourse
- Headquarters of banks on the rue de la République : Crédit Lyonnais, Banque de France
- Shopping street in the neighbourhood : rue de la République, rue Tupin, rue Ferrandière, rue Grenet, rue Édouard Herriot, Place des Jacobins, rue Mercière
- Pont Lafayette

== Bibliography ==
- Félix Rivet, "Une réalisation d'urbanisme à Lyon, le quartier Grolée, étude d'histoire et de géographie urbaine", Géographie de Lyon, 1955, 82 pages
