= Place de la République, Lyon =

Square in Lyon, France

Coordinates: 45°45′39″N 4°50′08″E

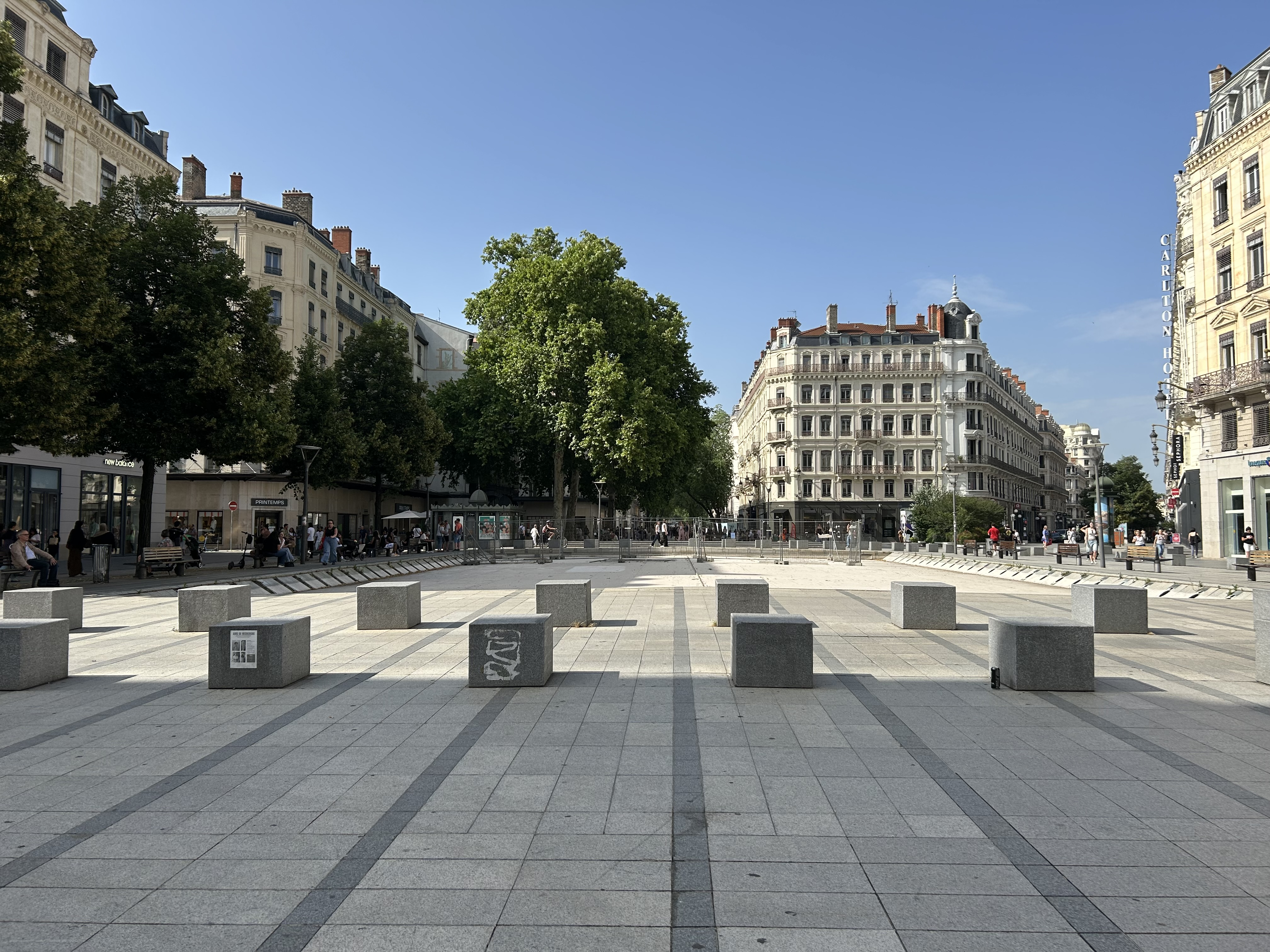
The square in 2025.

The Place de la République (French pronunciation: [plas d(ə) la ʁepyblik]; English: Republic Square) is a square located in the Bellecour quarter in the 2nd arrondissement of Lyon, France. It is crossed by the Rue de la République along a north-south axis. It belongs to the zone classified as World Heritage Site by UNESCO.

== History ==
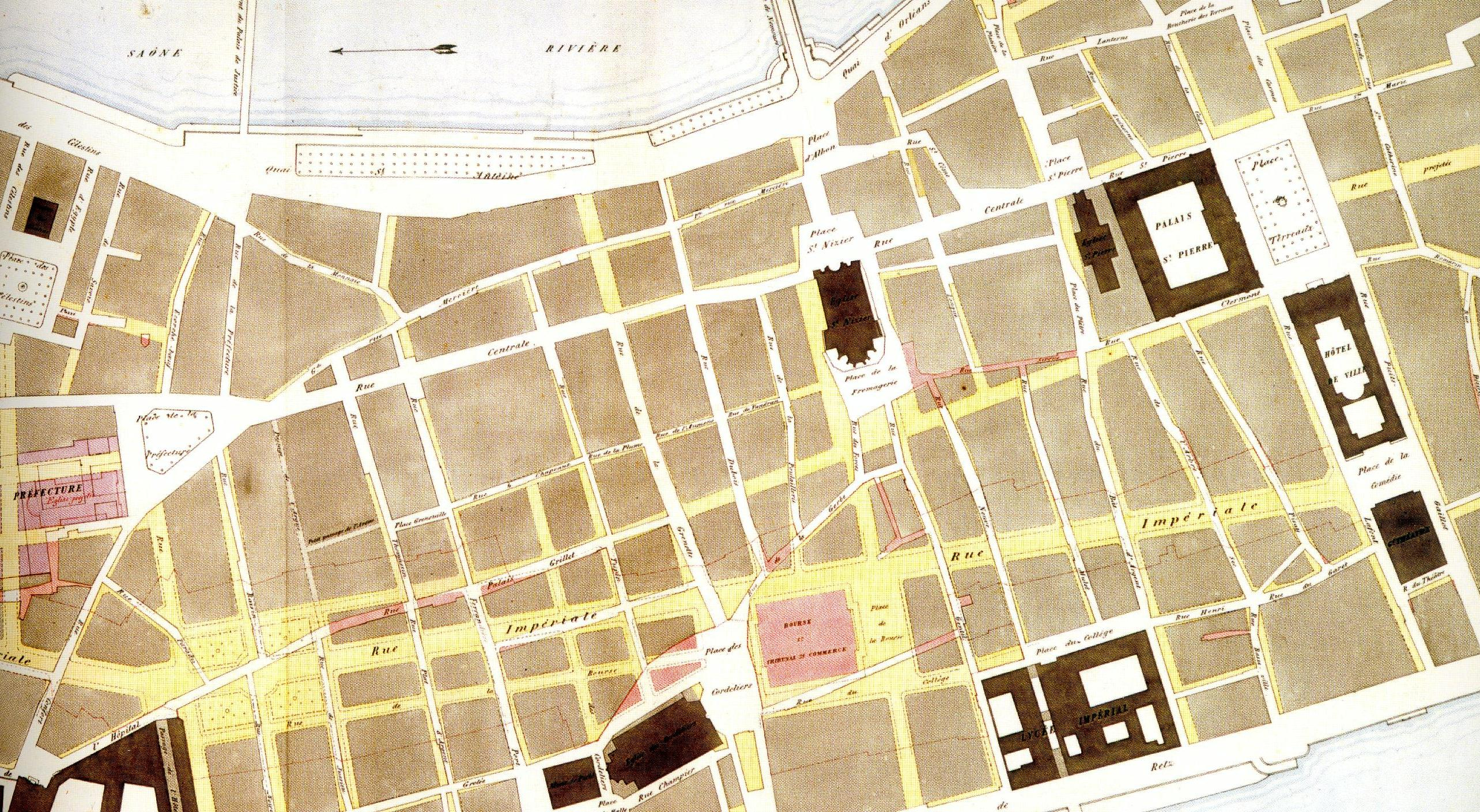
Plan of the projects on the Presqu'île in the 19th century, with the Place de la République left

The square was created in the dense urban web of the Presqu'île at the same time as the Rue Impériale (now named Rue de la République) in the second half of the 19th century when major works were led by the Prefect of Rhône Claude-Marius Vaïsse. Between 1862 and 1871, it was named Place Impériale, then renamed Place de Lyon. When the Rue de Lyon was renamed Rue de la République (by a prefectoral order on 5 September 1878), the square probably received its current name.

Originally, there was a fountain at the centre, flanked by two flower beds and trees at the east and the west. Then in the early 20th century, a statue of Sadi Carnot (assassinated nearby) and planes were added, but removed in 1974 during the construction of Lyon Metro Line A under the square. In 1990, an underground car park was created.

== Location and architecture ==
From the Place Bellecour to the south, the Rue Childebert (named after Childebert I) is just in front of the square. Other three streets are directly connected to the square: the Rue Jean de Tournes, Rue Stella and the Rue du Président-Carnot. A traboule/shopping mall from the Rue du Président-Édouard-Herriot also provides an access to the square: the Passage de l'Argue. The square is rectangular and a total of 11 streets lead to it.

The Place de la République is now composed of two kiosks, a glass carousel, two large plane trees and benches (at north). In the middle of the square, there is a large rectangular pool with many water jets and all around, stores of all types. To the north and the south, there are two three-floor houses which include wolves and monsters in their architecture. There is a more modern and higher building at the corner of Rue Childebert. The fountain basin at the centre of the square is so large that pedestrians can not cross diagonally.
