= Guillaume Benoît Couderc =

French politician (b. 1741, d. 1809)

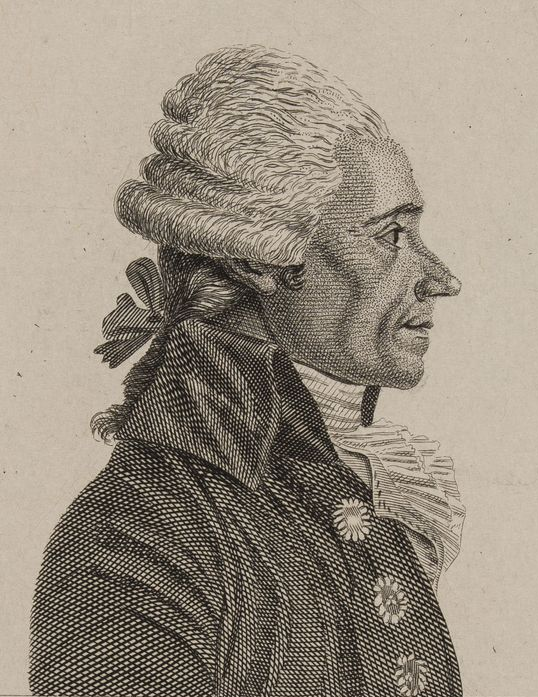
Guillaume Benoît Couderc

Guillaume Benoît Couderc (7 July 1741 in Lyon—9 May 1809 in Lyon), was a French businessman, merchant and politician. He was a member of the Estates General of 1789 and of the National Constituent Assembly.

== Biography ==
He was the son of Jean Couderc and Elisabeth Vernet. He was born in a banker family from Switzerland.

He worked as a merchant and banker in Lyon. He was a member of the Third Estate commission elected in January 1789 to prepare the cahiers de doléances (registers of grievances). On 30 March 1789, he was elected a Third Estate representative to the Estates General. He was also a member of the National Constituent Assembly. In 1791, he received Protestant merchants at his home to talk about trade-related issues.

He was subsequently a member of the commercial court, president of the Chamber of Commerce and Industry of Lyon and general councillor for commerce in Paris. He was general councillor of the hospices. He was the departmental councillor of Rhône from 1800 to 1809.

His uncle in Geneva was from the Vernet-Dupan family.

He was the father of politician Jean Couderc.

He died in Lyon on 9 May 1809.

== Bibliography ==
- "Guillaume Benoît Couderc", in Adolphe Robert and Gaston Cougny, Dictionnaire des parlementaires français (1789–1891), Bourloton, Paris, 1889 Edition details Wikisource
- Benoit, Bruno; Saussac, Roland (1988). Guide historique de la Révolution à Lyon; 1789-1799 (in French). Editions du Trévoux. ISBN 2-85698-043-0.
- Béghain, Patrice; Benoît, Bruno; Corneloup, Gérard; Thévenon, Bruno (2009). Dictionnaire historique de Lyon (in French). Lyon: Stéphane Bachès. ISBN 9782915266658.
