= Rue Mercière =

Street in Lyon, France

Coordinates: 45°45′45″N 4°49′58″E

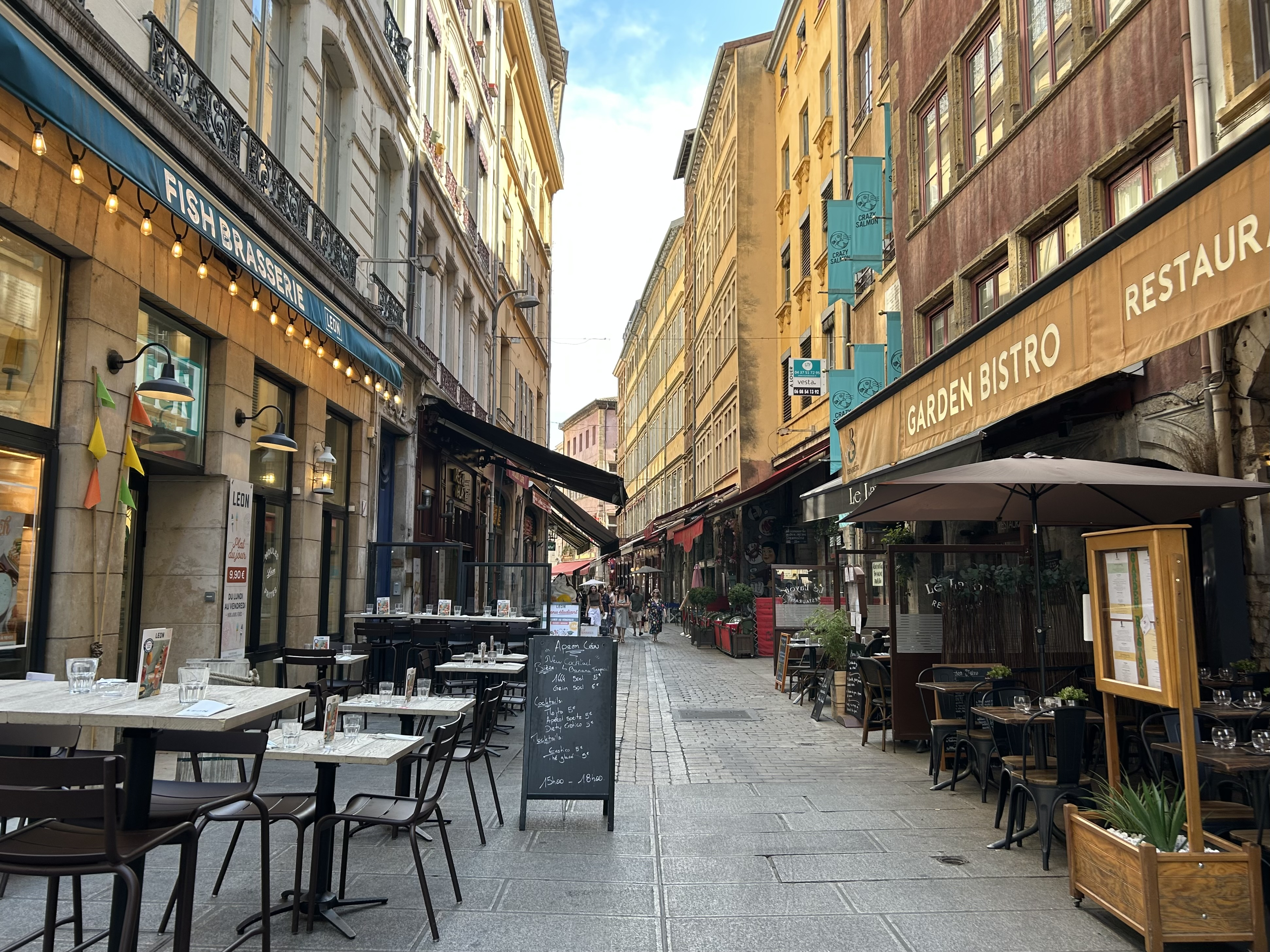
- The street in 2025.
- Former name(s): Rue Marchire
- Type: Street
- Location: 2nd arrondissement of Lyon, Lyon, France
- Postal code: 69002

Construction
- Construction start: 13th century

The Rue Mercière (French pronunciation: [ʁy mɛʁsjɛʁ]) is a street of Les Cordeliers quarter in the 2nd arrondissement of Lyon. From north to south, it connects the Place des Jacobins to the Place d'Albon. This street is served by metro stations Bellecour and Cordeliers of the line and by the bus station Jacobins of the line S1. It belongs to the zone classified as World Heritage Site by UNESCO.

== History ==
=== Late antiquity - 17th century ===
Etymologically, the French word "Mercière" refers to "merchant", which is the main activity of the street. Previously, the Petite Rue Mercière was distinguished from the Rue Dubois in the south and the Grande Rue Mercière at the north. This is one of the oldest streets of Lyon and was probably created during the late antiquity. From the 13th to the 18th century, it was the main street of Lyon on the left river of the Saône. In the 16th century, it was the street of printers and notably housed Sébastien Gryphe's workshop, at the corner of the Rue Thomassin. At No. 64, the ruins of the Church of Anthonians can be seen. The Hôtel de la Rose, directed by Jacques Cœur, was occupied by the consulate from 1459 for three years. The No. 64, called the "Cave of Ainay", was owned by the Ainay abbey until 1542.

The composer Louis Marchand was born at number 2 in 1669. The almanac of Lyon was printed in this street from 1740 to 1836. Among the famous residents of the street are Heinrich Cornelius Agrippa (1509) who held the secret society named l'Agla, Langlai brothers who printed Simon Maupin's Lyon map, and writer André Steyert who was born in this street in 1830.

=== 18th and 20th centuries ===
As for other streets of the close quarter, the Gas Company of Perrache made its first test of gas lighting in the street in 1835.

In the 19th and 20th century, the street, fallen into disrepair, was the object of several redevelopment projects, including the project Moncorgé named Transformation et embellissement de Lyon in 1909. In 1925, the SEL contest already aimed to transform the neighborhood. By the mid 19th century, the street was covered with asphalt and all buildings in the eastern part were deleted when the Rue Centrale was created. The project of F. Chollat, with his 5th prize, wanted to build in the street Mercière a modern quarter and a fifty-stage skyscraper. A radical project of destruction was halted at the last minute in 1956 by André Malraux. In 1958, the city council took the decision to renovate the quarter Mercière-Saint-Antoine. The northern part of the street was demolished between the street and the dock to create a major building project : Mr. Marot, chief architect of the Bâtiments Civils et Palais Nationaux, elaborated a project modified eighteen times to "protect the variety of appearance and fancy which were the charm of the old neighborhood".

The southern part of the street was particularly known for its prostitutes until the 1970s and was also the subject of a development plan near the Place des Jacobins.

Big changes were made in the 1980s. The embellishment was then spectacular and the street became pedestrian. In the south, it currently houses a large number of restaurants, including many bouchons of Lyon and bars, making the street a popular quarter for the tourists. It has a major architectural heritage by the presence of a row of buildings created during the Renaissance.

== Architecture ==
On the west side, the street starts with a seven-floor building of the 1970s. On the east side, there is a row of stone buildings of the 19th century, with five storeys. Between the Rue Grenette and the luxurious hotel Horace Cardon, the street is narrower, with on the west, a row of Renaissance-styled houses with mullioned windows. The street ends with a modern home and a garden.

A plaque shows the location of Étienne Dolet's print shop (16th century), another one from the Hospices Civils de Lyon is attached to the printer and alderman Guillaume de Rouville's house, and another one is on the Hôtel Horace Cardon mentioning 18th-century printer Fleury Mesplet.

The opened traboule at No. 45 crosses two buildings and is composed of a 17th-century building and a courtyard with a spiral staircase. The closed traboule at No. 49 is straight starts with a high-storey building.

== Gallery ==
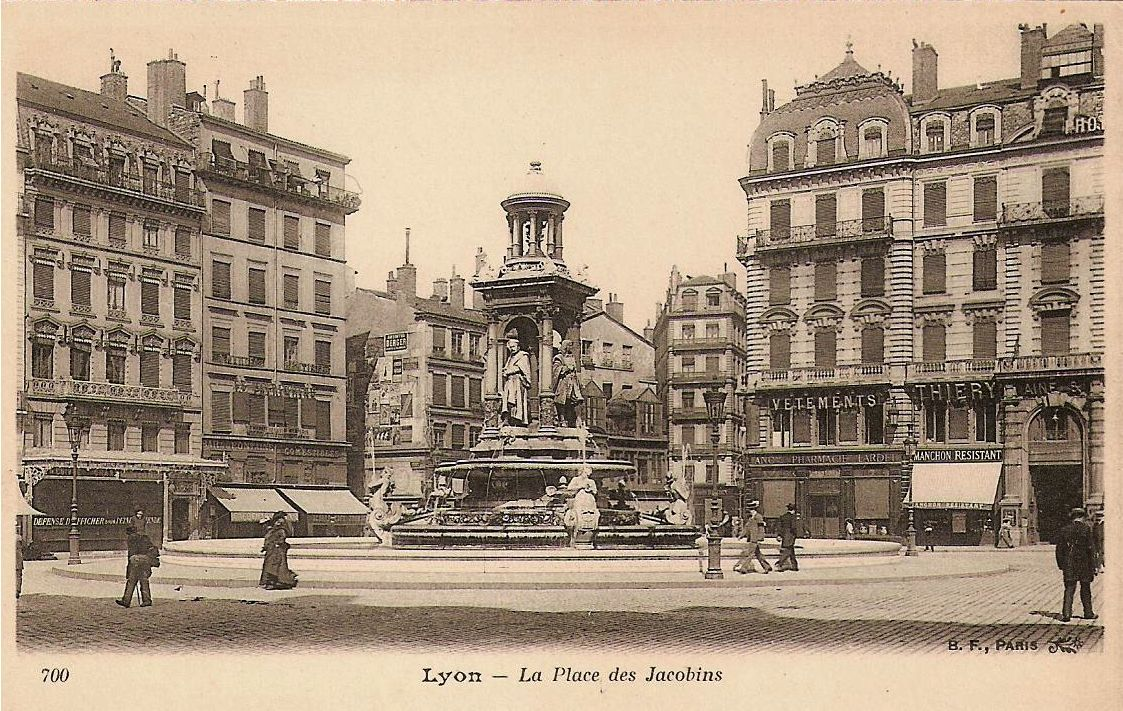
The Place des Jacobins, in 1900. In the background, the first buildings of the Rue Mercière, destroyed when it was re-developed in its southern part.

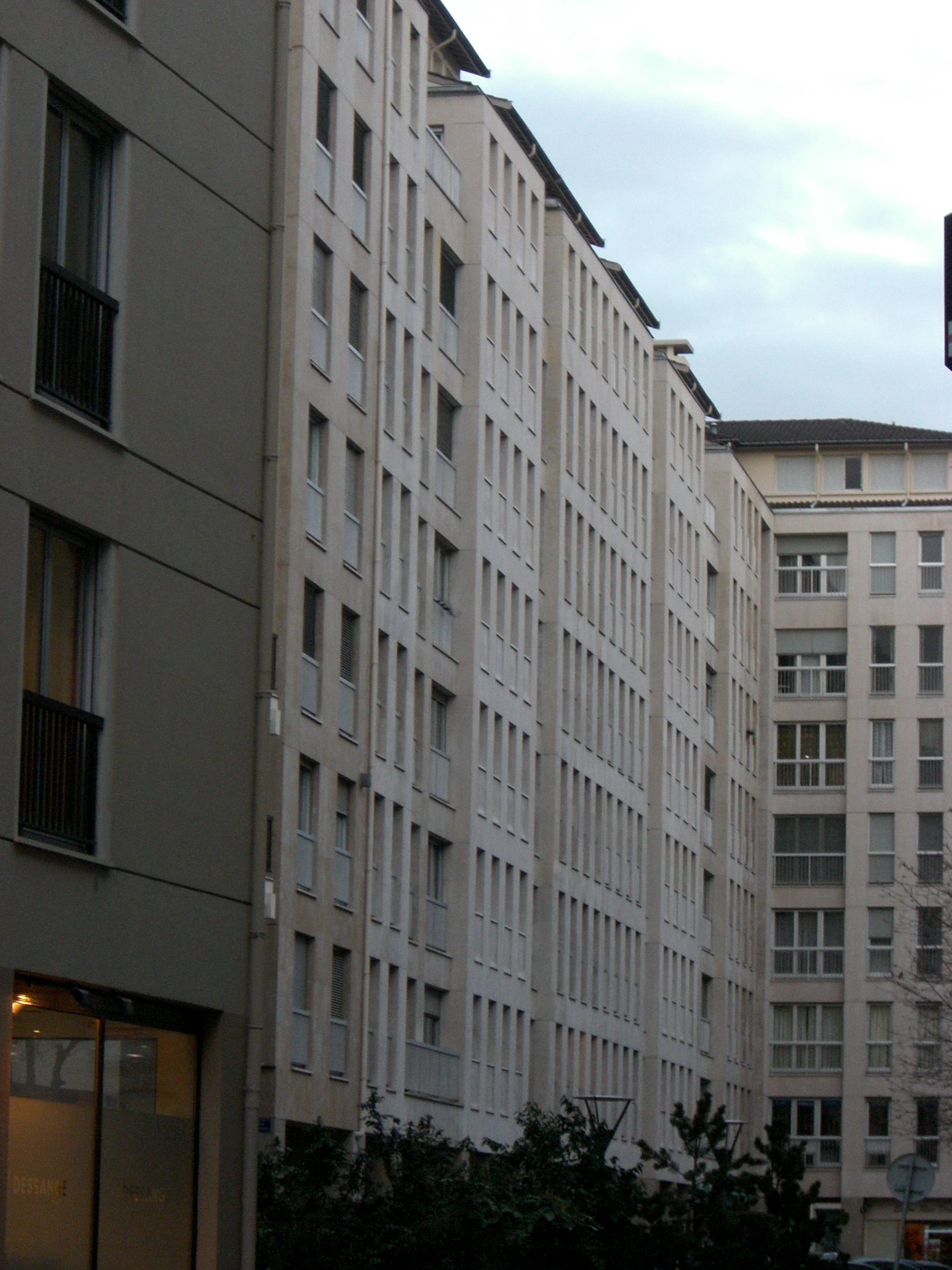
Redevelopment of the northern part, the buildings on the Rue Mercière

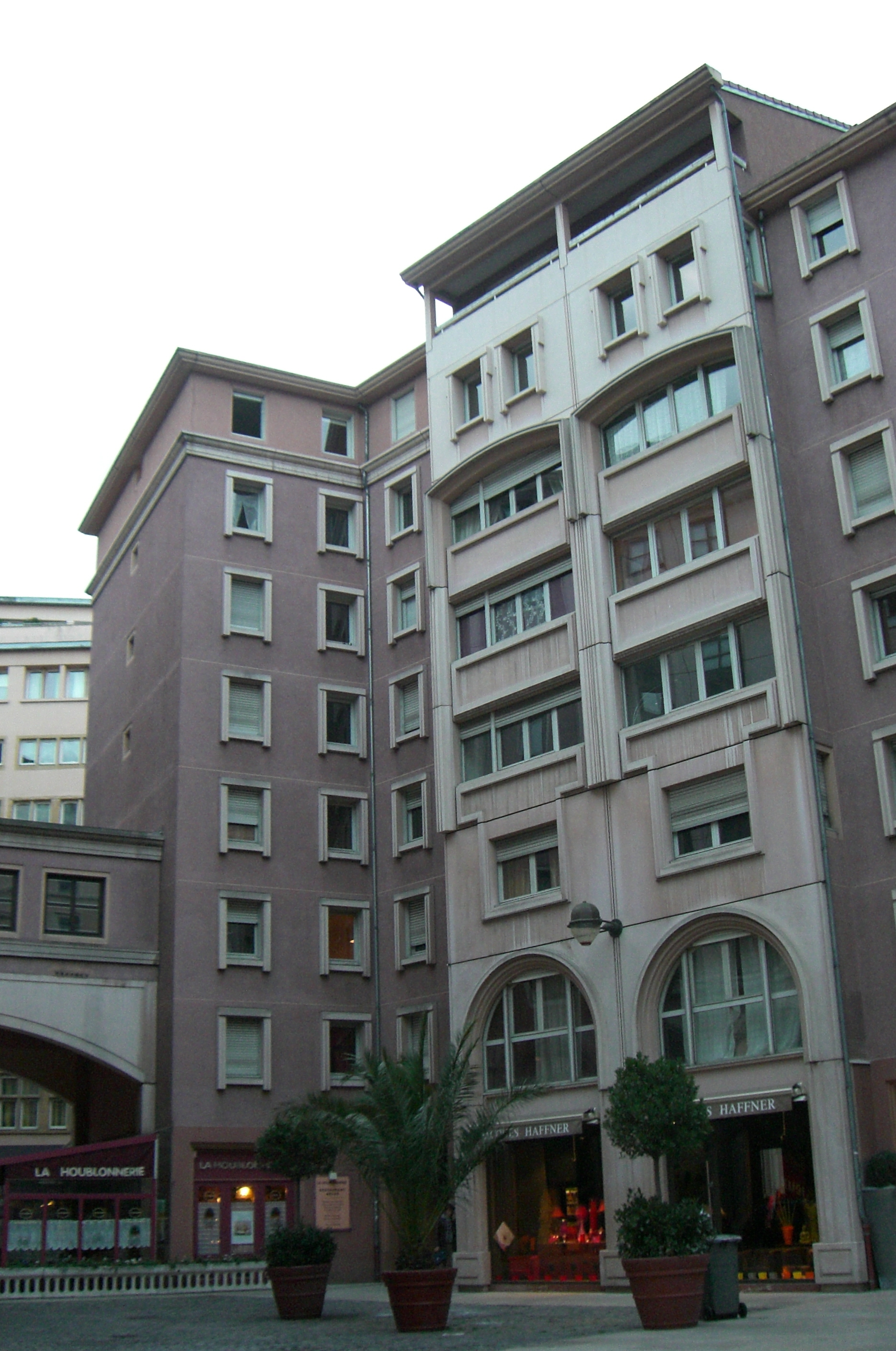
Southern part, re-development near the Place des Jacobins

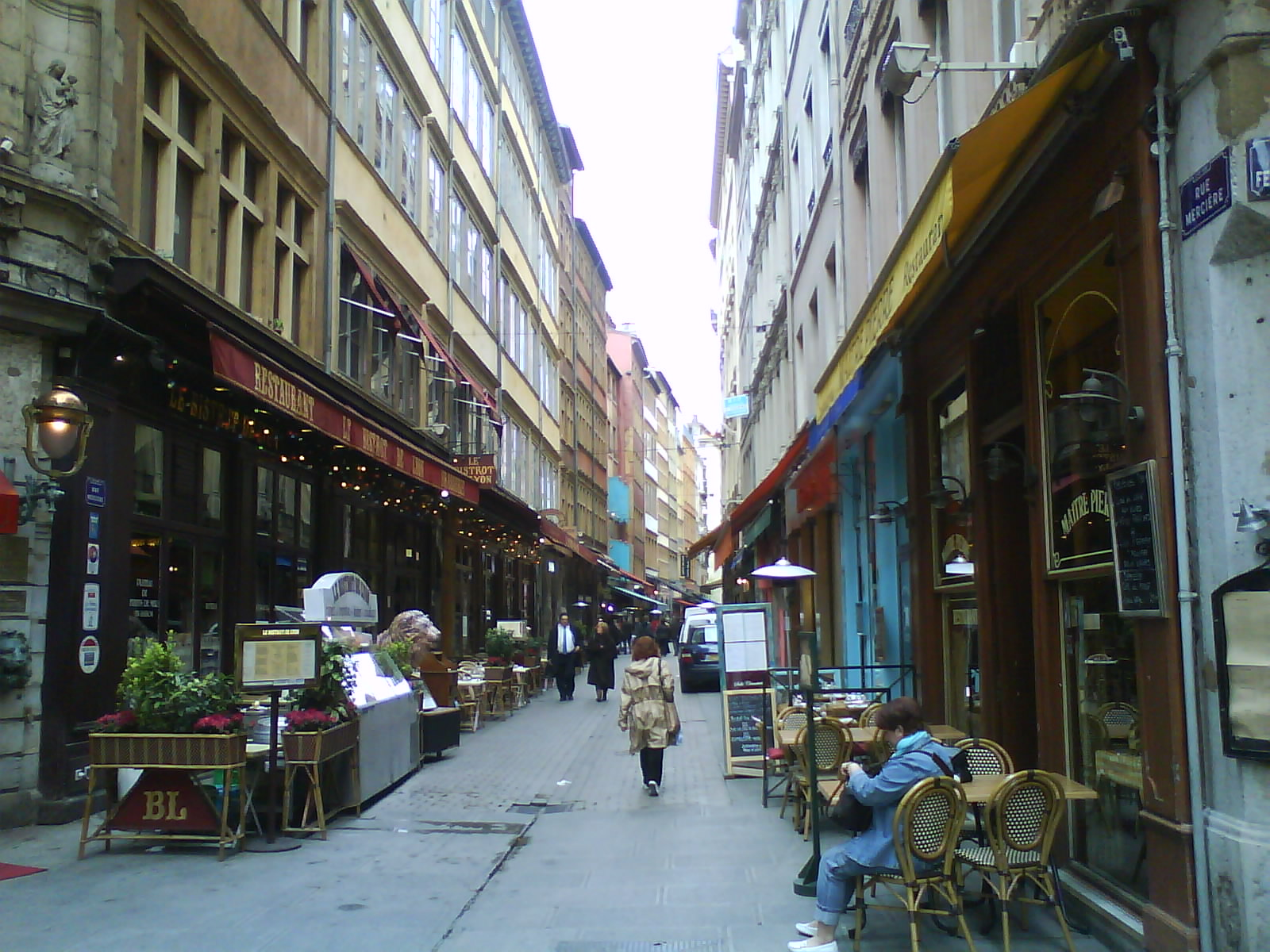
The bouchons in the central part of the street, viewed from the south
