= Palais de la Bourse, Lyon =

Building in Lyon, France

Coordinates: 45°45′50″N 4°50′11″E

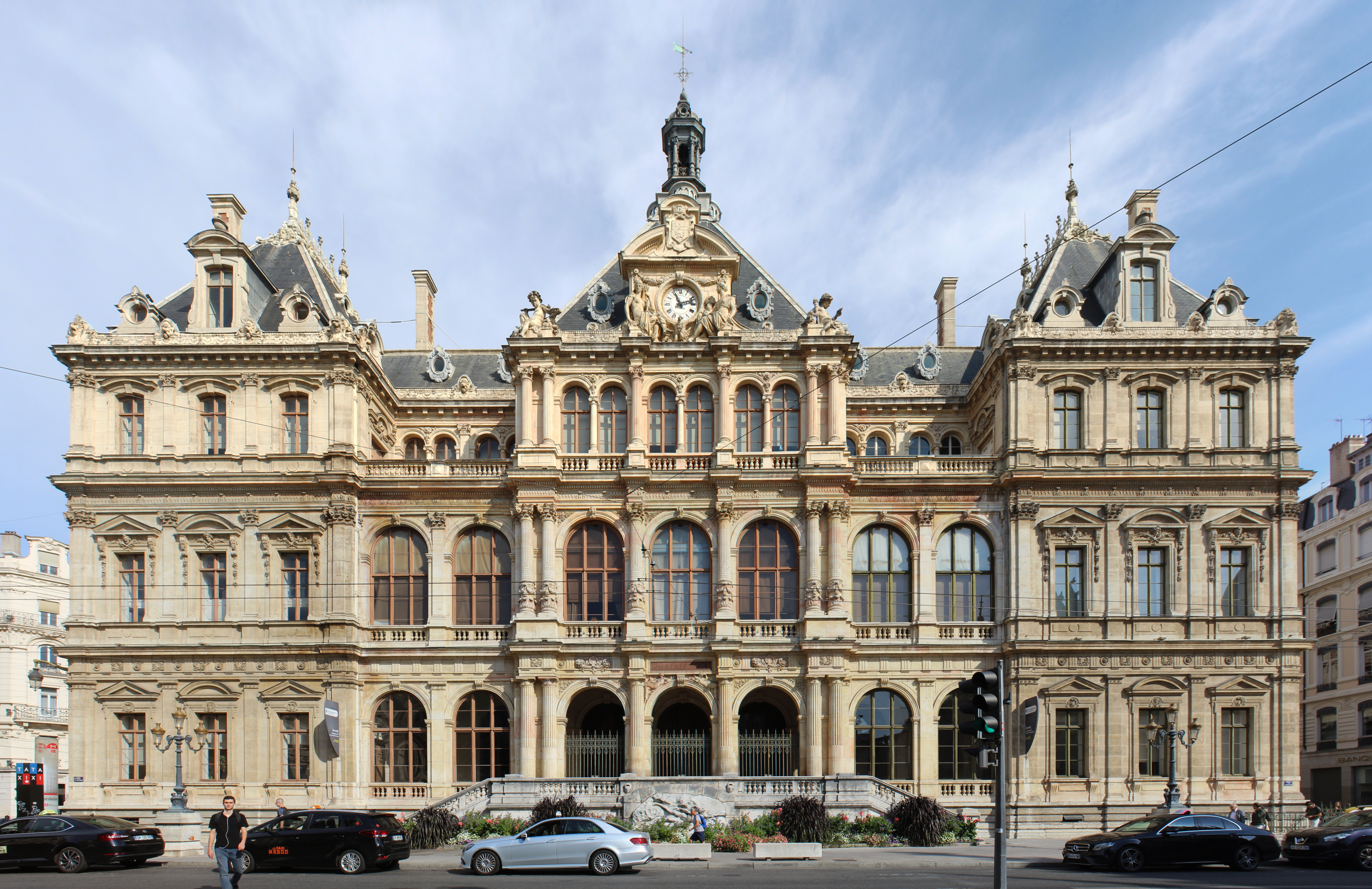
The Palais de la Bourse on the Place des Cordeliers seen in 2018

The Palais de la Bourse (French pronunciation: [palɛ d(ə) la buʁs]) or Palais du Commerce ([palɛ dy kɔmɛʁs]) is a building in the Les Cordeliers quarter in 2nd arrondissement of Lyon. It currently houses the headquarters of the Chamber of Commerce and Industry (CCI) of Lyon. In 1994, the building was classified a monument historique.

It is bordered by the Place des Cordeliers to the south, the Place de la Bourse to the north, the Rue de la République to the west and Rue de la Bourse to the east. It is served by the Lyon Metro station Cordeliers on Line A, as well as by bus lines C3,13, 18, 23, 25, 28, 58, 71, 91 and 99.

== History ==
In 1853, the construction of the Palais du Commerce was decided under the leadership of Prefect of Rhône Claude-Marius Vaïsse, composing of a museum of art and industry, shops, the company of change agents and brokers in silk, the Chamber of Commerce and the Commercial Court. On 4 August 1854, René Dardel, architect of Pont La Feuillée, the covered halls located on the Rue de la Martinière, in addition to the creation of Rue Victor Hugo, was chosen by Prefect Vaïsse for the construction of the building.

The construction started in 1856 with the first stone laid on 15 March. The building was inaugurated by Napoleon III and Empress Eugenie on 25 August 1860.

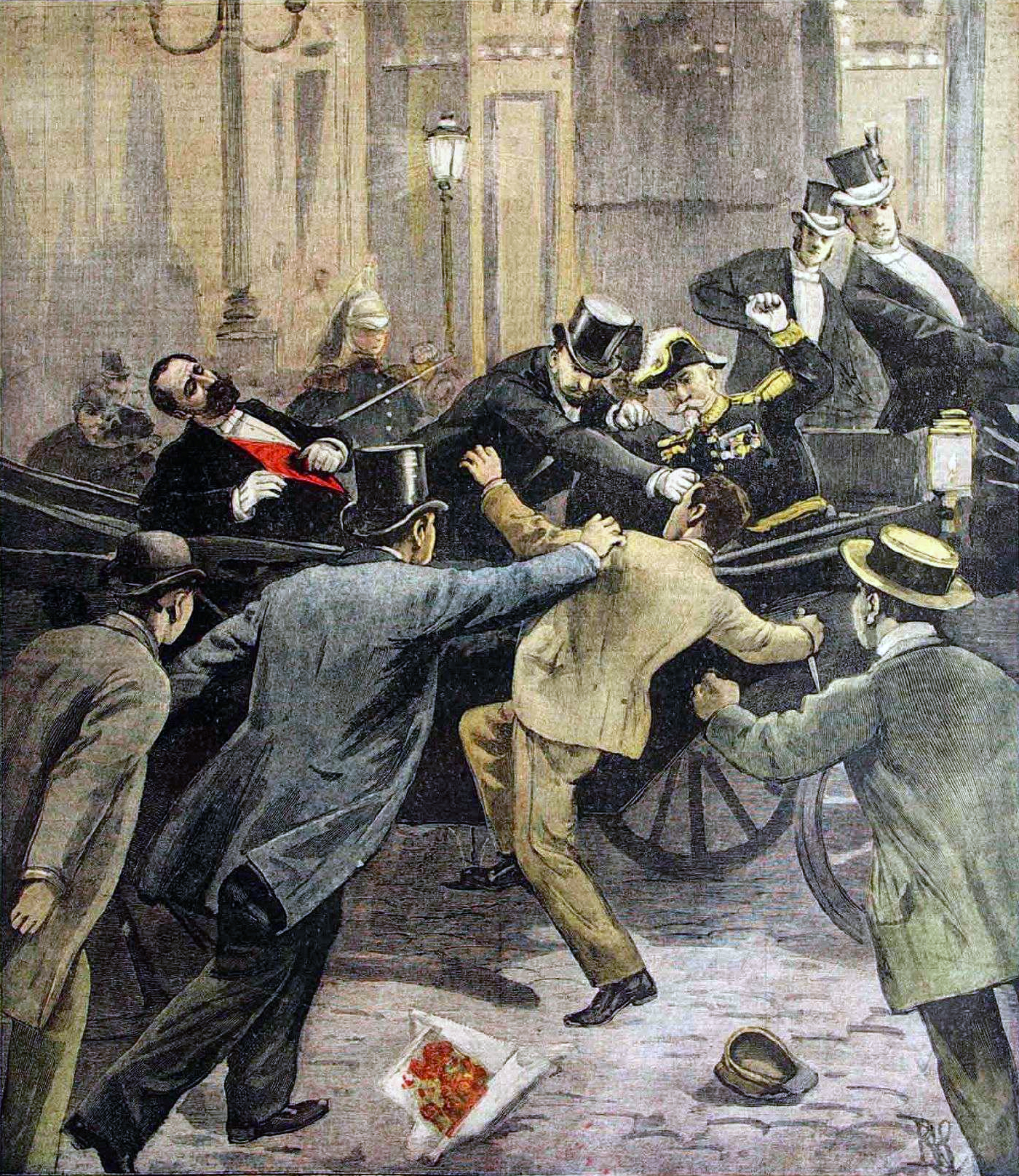
Illustration of Carnot's assassination outside the Palais de la Bourse

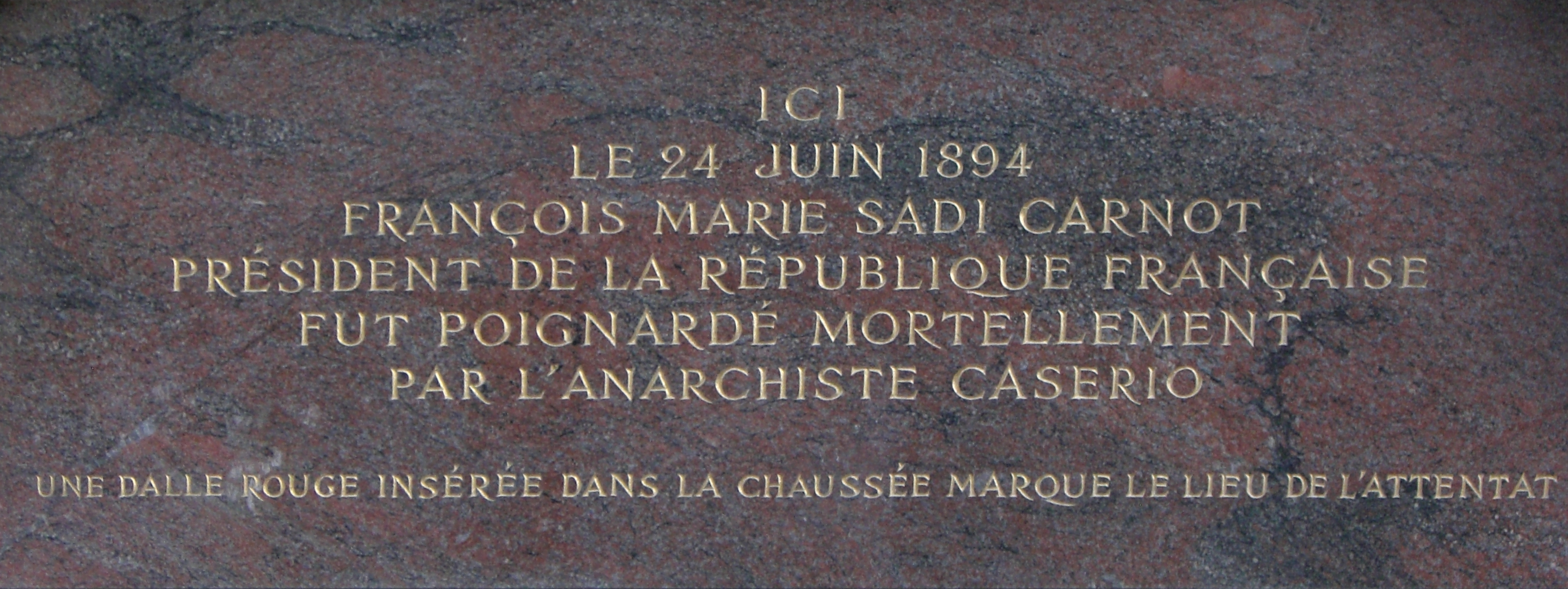
The commemorative plaque about Carnot's murder

On 24 June 1894, President Sadi Carnot was assassinated leaving the building by the anarchist Caserio under the windows located on the Rue de la République.

== Architecture ==
The dimensions of the building are 56.6 metres large and 64.5 metres wide. It is composed of four corner pavilions and a central hall, called the "Salle de la Corbeille".

The decoration of the building, both in its facades that its interior, reflects its destination: the statues of Justice, the Temperance, Agriculture, Trade and Industry. The group around the clock on the facade is the work of Jean-Marie Bonnassieux. The exterior white marble statue, near the stairs and the Place des Cordeliers, is an allegory that personified the Saône and Rhône joining their arms to point to the future. It was made in 1905 by sculptor André Vermare.

The two fronts at north and south are richly decorated with many entablatures, balconies and columns. Most paintings of interior ceilings are the work of artists from Lyon such as Antoine Claude Ponthus-Cinier or Jean-Baptiste Beuchot.

== Uses ==
Initially devoted to host many institutions, the Palais de la Bourse, now Chamber of Commerce and Industry of Lyon hosted:

- The Commercial Court
- The Company of brokers in silk and goods, until 1867
- The Employment Tribunal held its meetings until 1927
- The Crédit Lyonnais, until 1934.

== Gallery ==
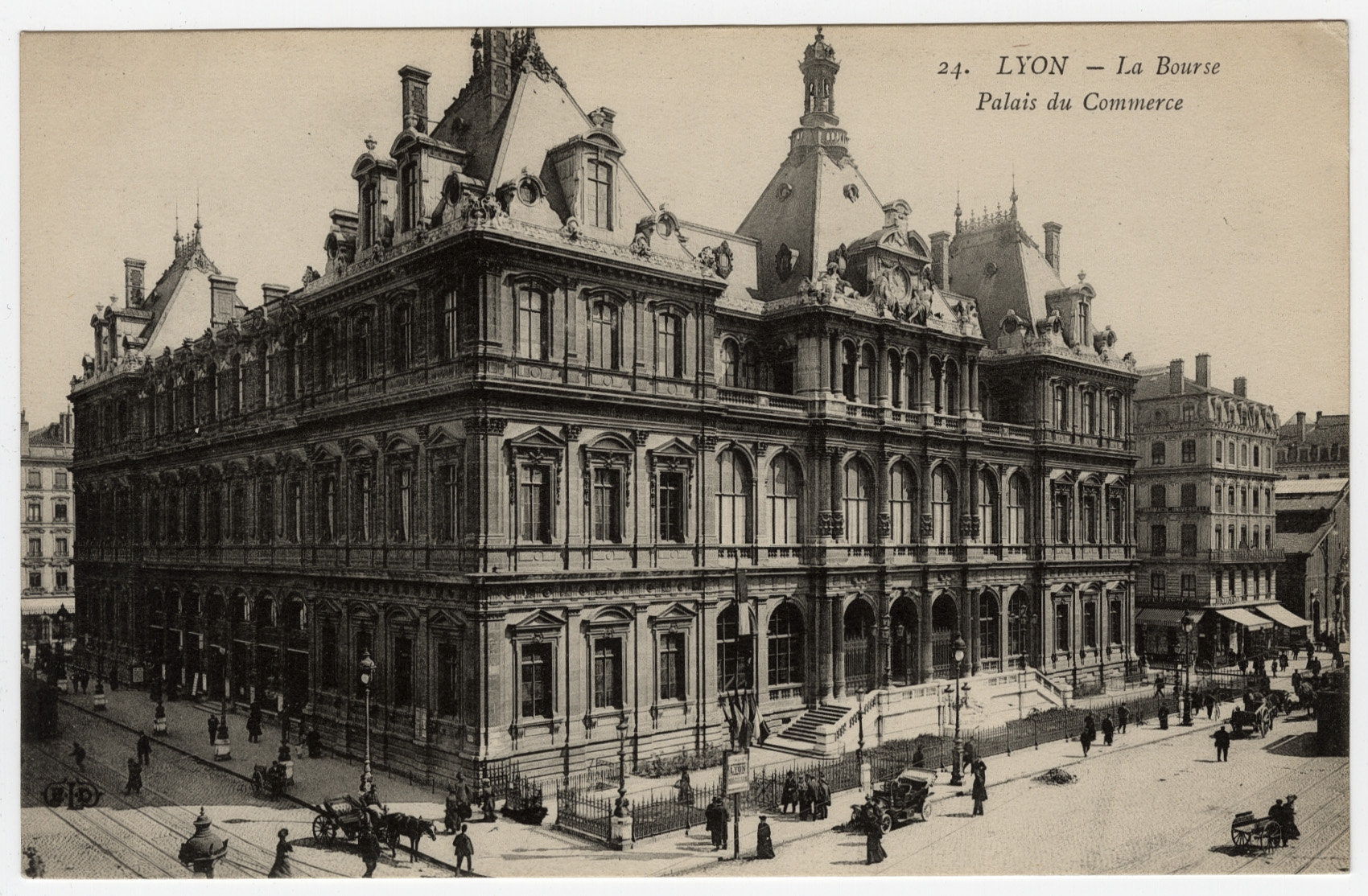
The building c. 1900

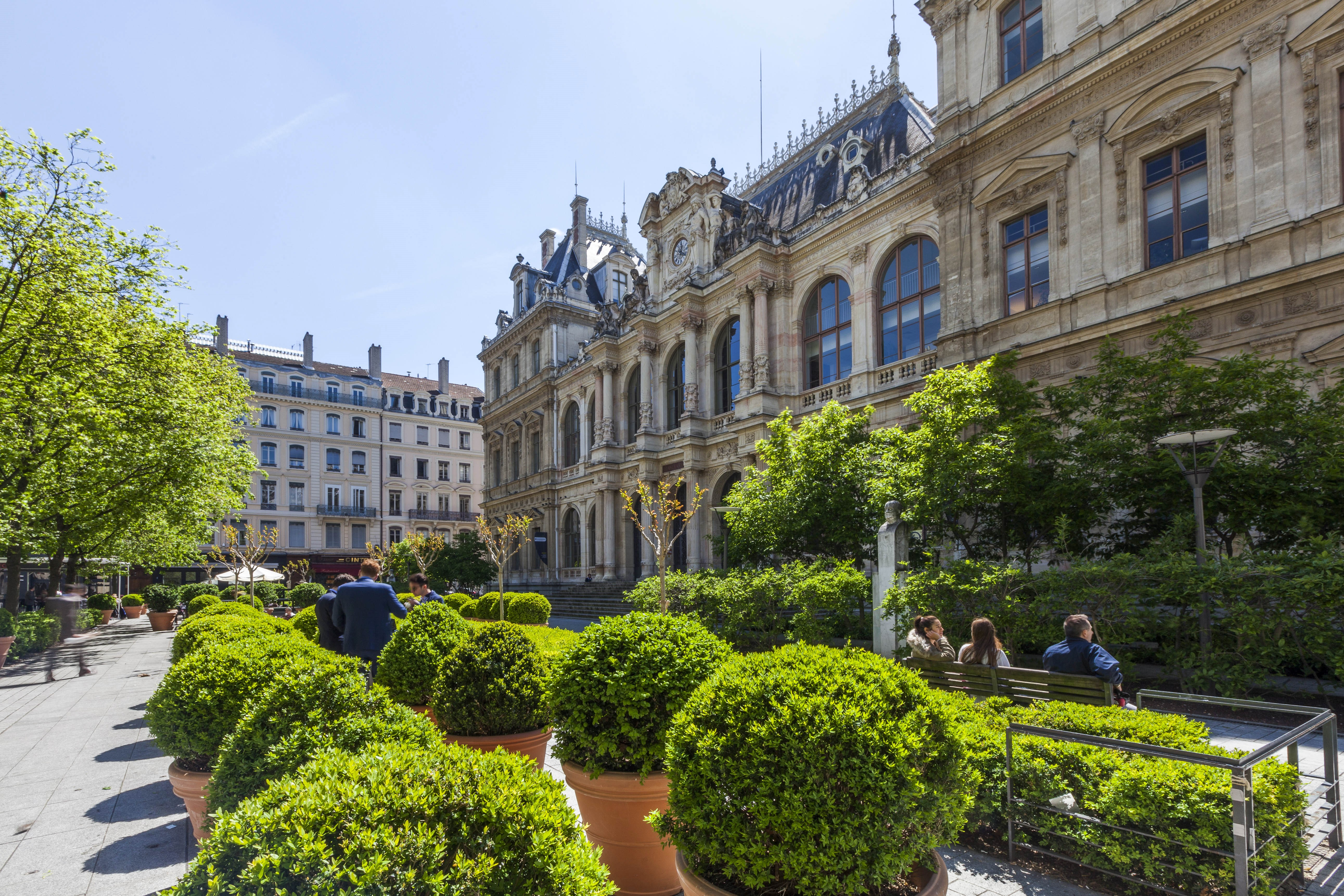
Façade on the Place de la Bourse

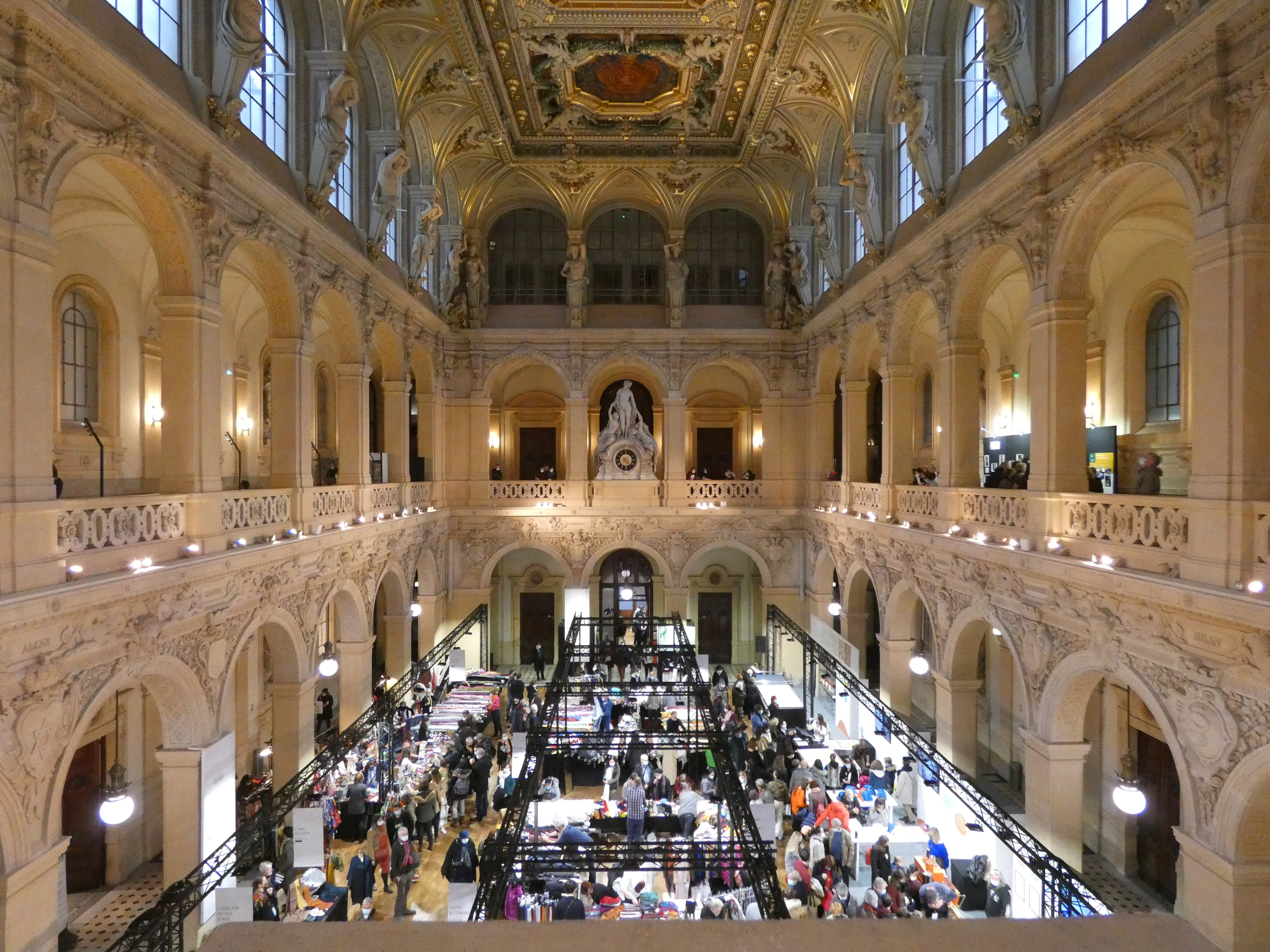
Interior: the Salle de la Corbeille

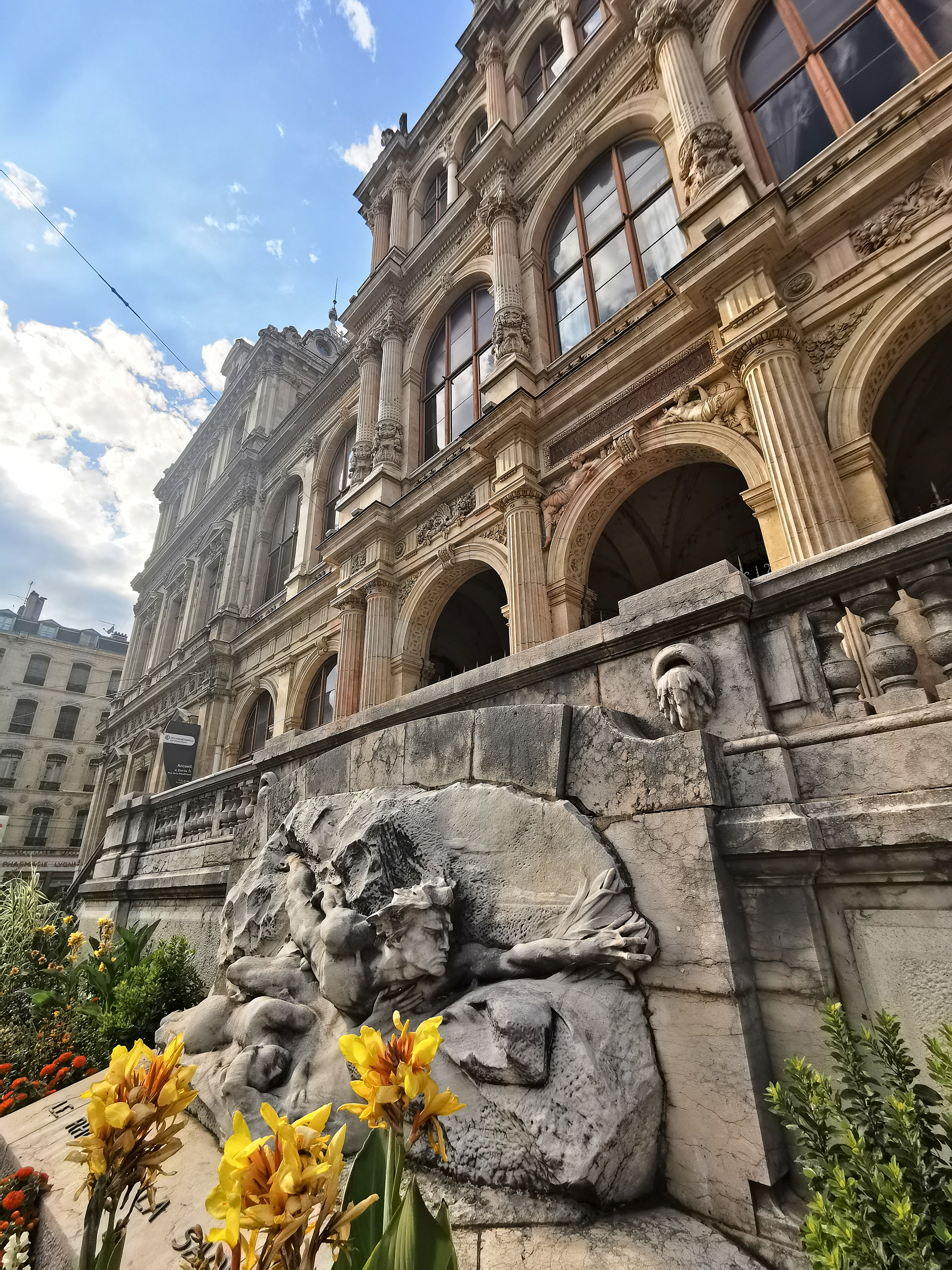
Vermare's sculpture representing the Rhône ♂ and the Saône ♀

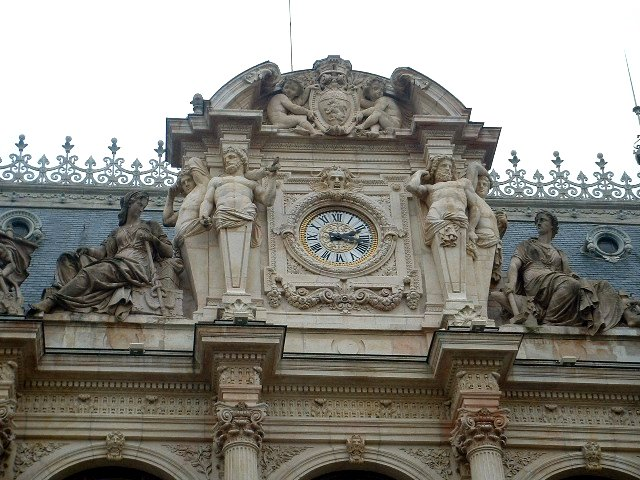
The clock of the Palais de la Bourse
