= Jean-Marie Bonnassieux =

French sculptor

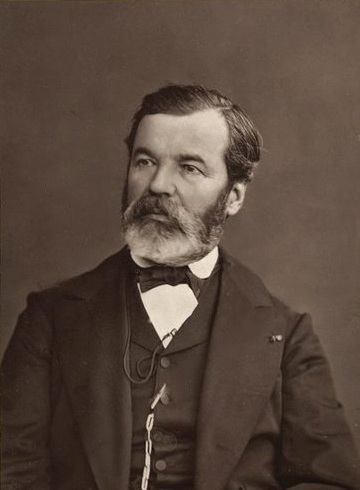
Jean Marie Bonnassieux

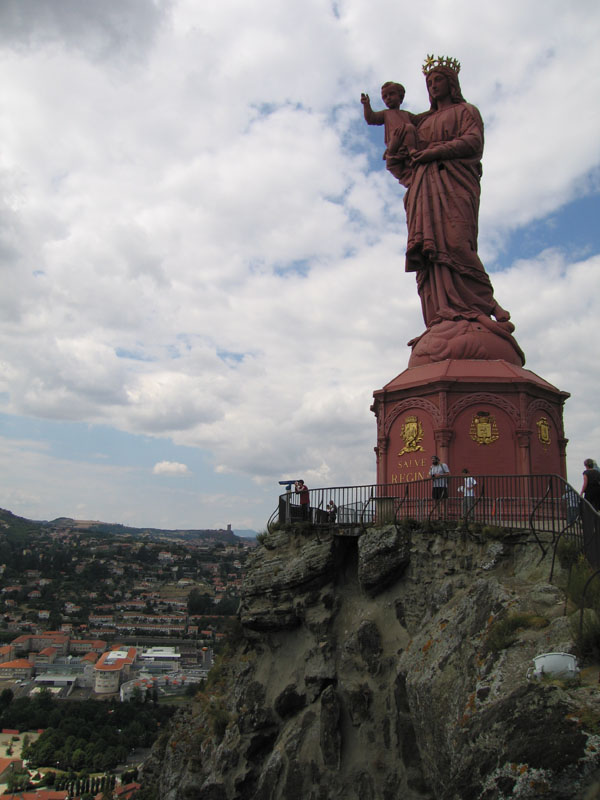
Notre-Dame de France, Le Puy-en-Velay

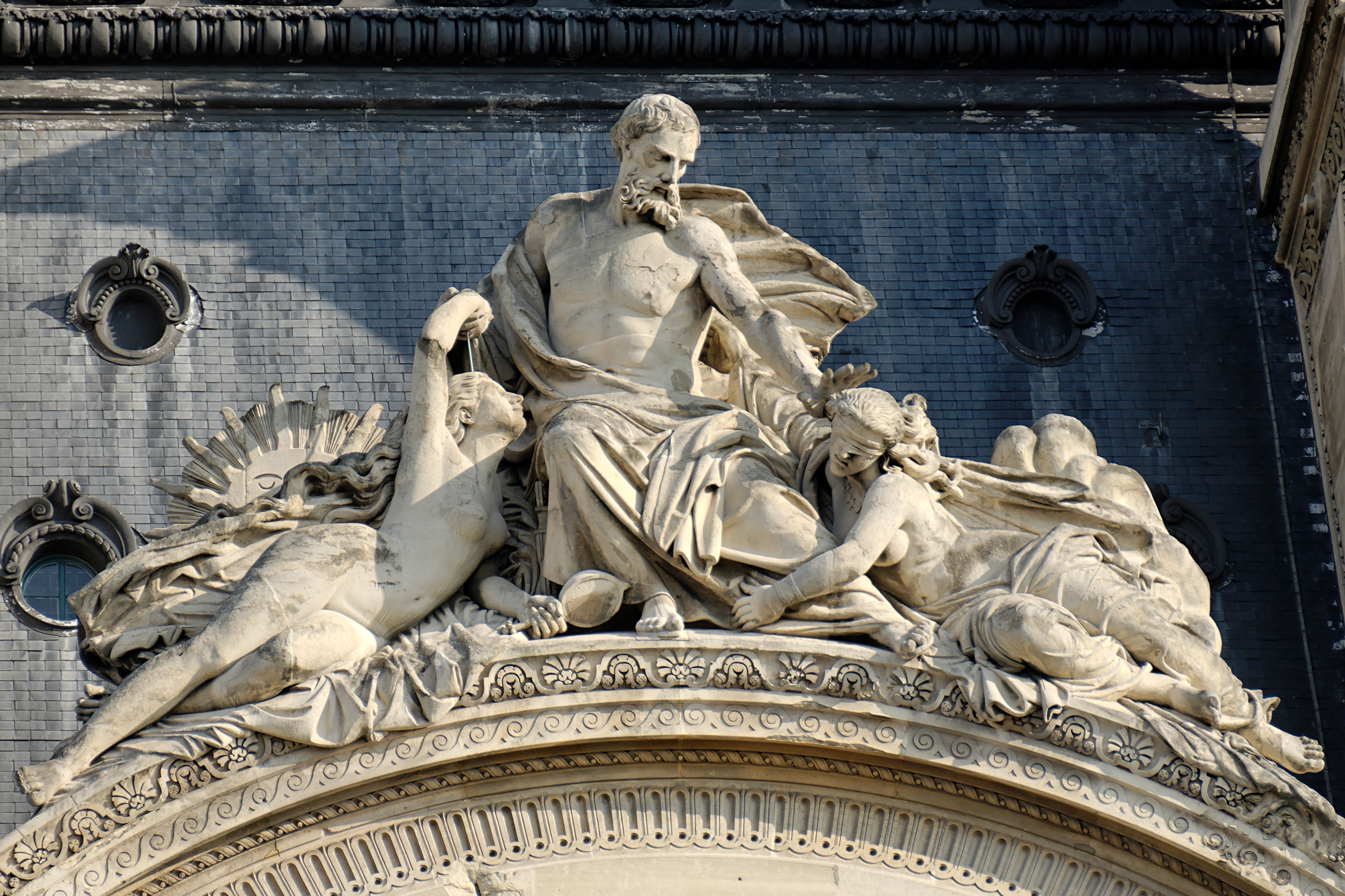
Wisdom, Truth and Error, Pavillon de Marsan

Jean-Marie Bienaimé Bonnassieux (French pronunciation: [ʒɑ̃ maʁi bɔnasjø]; 1810, Panissières, Loire – 1892) was a French sculptor.

== Biography ==
Born the son of a cabinet maker in Lyon, Bonnassieux exhibited talent from a young age.He received his education at the École nationale supérieure des Beaux-Arts in Paris under the guidance of Augustin-Alexandre Dumont. In 1836, he shared the Prix de Rome with Auguste Ottin, after which he continued his studies in Rome under the tutelage of Ingres.

Subsequently, Bonnassieux became a teacher at the Ecole. Among his pupils in the 1880s were the young American Lorado Taft and the British-American sculptor Henry Hudson Kitson. A study by A. Le Normand, La Tradition Classique et l'Esprit Romantique: Les sculpteurs de l'académie de France à Rome de 1824 à 1840 (Rome, 1991), places Bonnassieux within the context of the rigorous French academic training of the 19th century, examining the careers of seventeen winners of the Prix de Rome.

Bonnassieux is buried at Montparnasse Cemetery.

== Selected works ==
- Wisdom, Truth and Error, allegorical group on top of the Pavillon de Marsan, facing the Tuileries, at the Palais du Louvre, and other work at the Louvre from the 1850s through the 1870s
- bronze figure of Henri IV, Place de Henri IV, La Flèche, 1856
- Groupe des Heures over the clock, Palais de la Bourse, Lyon, 1858 and 1863
- The iron statue of Notre-Dame de France overlooking the town of Le Puy-en-Velay is made from 213 Russian cannons taken in the Siege of Sevastopol (1854–1855) and was presented to the public on 12 September 1860 in front of 120,000 people.
- monument at the tomb of Jean Auguste Dominique Ingres, Père Lachaise Cemetery, 1868
- architectural work at the Palais de Justice, Paris, 1868
- figure of Archbishop of Paris Georges Darboy, St. Georges chapel, Notre Dame de Paris, 1872

== Sources ==
- Daniel Cady Eaton, A Handbook of Modern French Sculpture,
- Thierry Boyer-Bonnassieux
- Grove Dictionary of Art
