= Rue de la République =

Street in Lyon, France

- Rue Impériale (1862–1871)
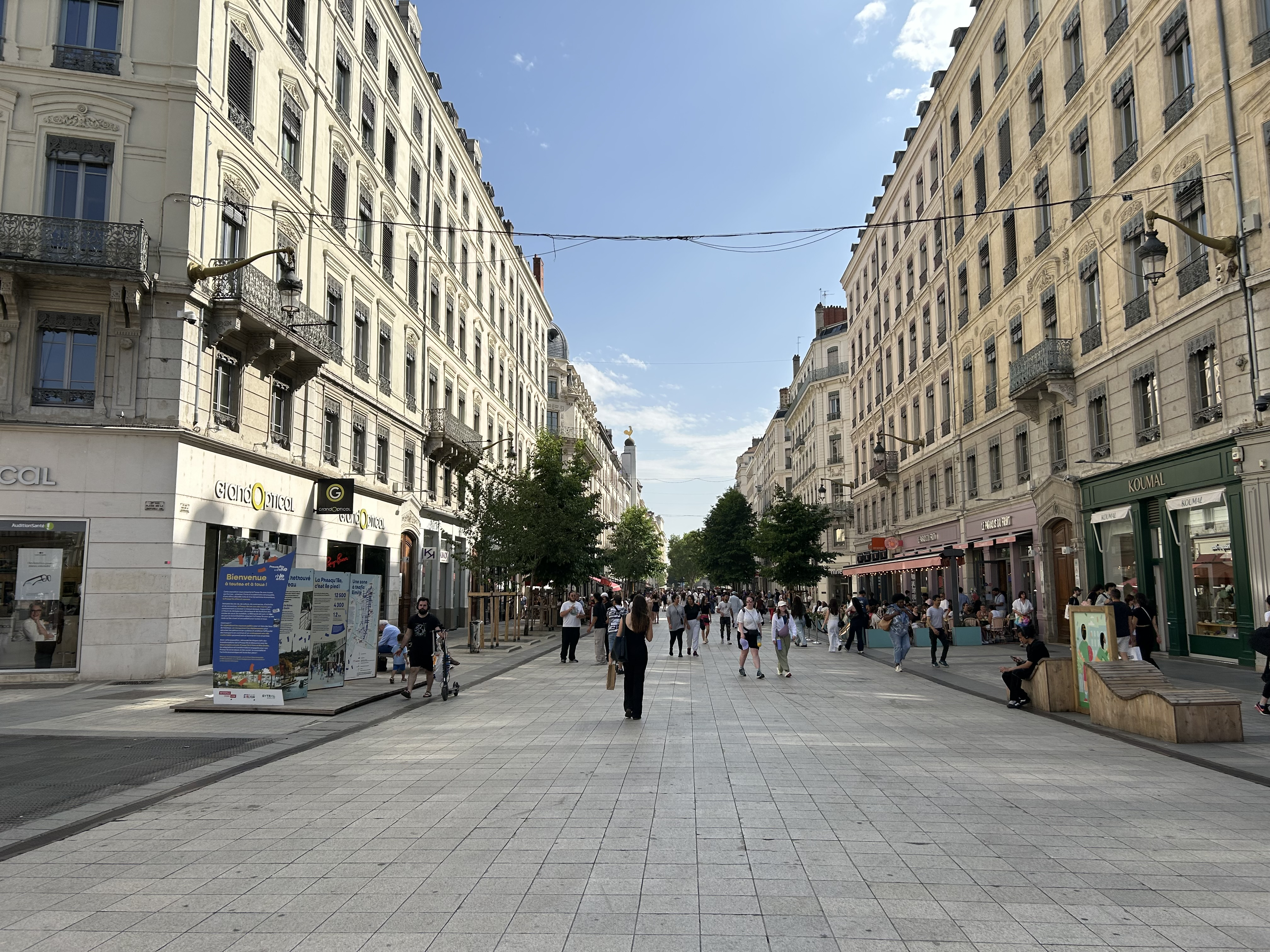
- The street in 2025.
- Interactive map of Rue de la République
- Former name: Rue de Lyon (1871–1878)
- Type: Street
- Location: 1st and 2nd arrondissements, Lyon, France
- Postal code: 69001, 69002
- Coordinates: 45°45′47″N 4°50′9″E

Construction
- Inauguration: 1862

The Rue de la République (French pronunciation: [ʁy də la ʁepyblik]) is a street located in the 1st and 2nd arrondissements of Lyon, France. It links the Place de la Comédie in the north to the Place Le Viste in the south, just next to the Place Bellecour, via the Place de la République.

It is the main shopping street of the city. This zone is served by the Lyon Metro stations Hôtel de Ville–Louis Pradel (lines and), Cordeliers (line) and Bellecour (lines and). The street belongs to the zone classified as World Heritage Site by UNESCO.

A street with an identical name exists in many other French cities, most notably in Marseille, where it links the Vieux-Port with the La Joliette neighbourhood.

== History ==
After his appointment in 1853, the prefect of Rhône and Mayor of Lyon Claude-Marius Vaïsse decided to create three new roads connecting the Place Bellecour to other major squares of the Presqu'île:

- The Rue Victor-Hugo, connecting the Place Bellecour and the Place Carnot
- The Rue de l'Impératrice, then renamed the Rue de l'Hôtel-de-Ville and then the Rue du Président-Édouard-Herriot, between the Place Bellecour and the Place des Terreaux
- The Rue Impériale (1862–1871), later renamed the Rue de Lyon (1871–1878), then Rue de la République (since August–September 1878), which leads from the Place Louis Pradel (where are the Hôtel de Ville and the Opera) to the Place Bellecour.

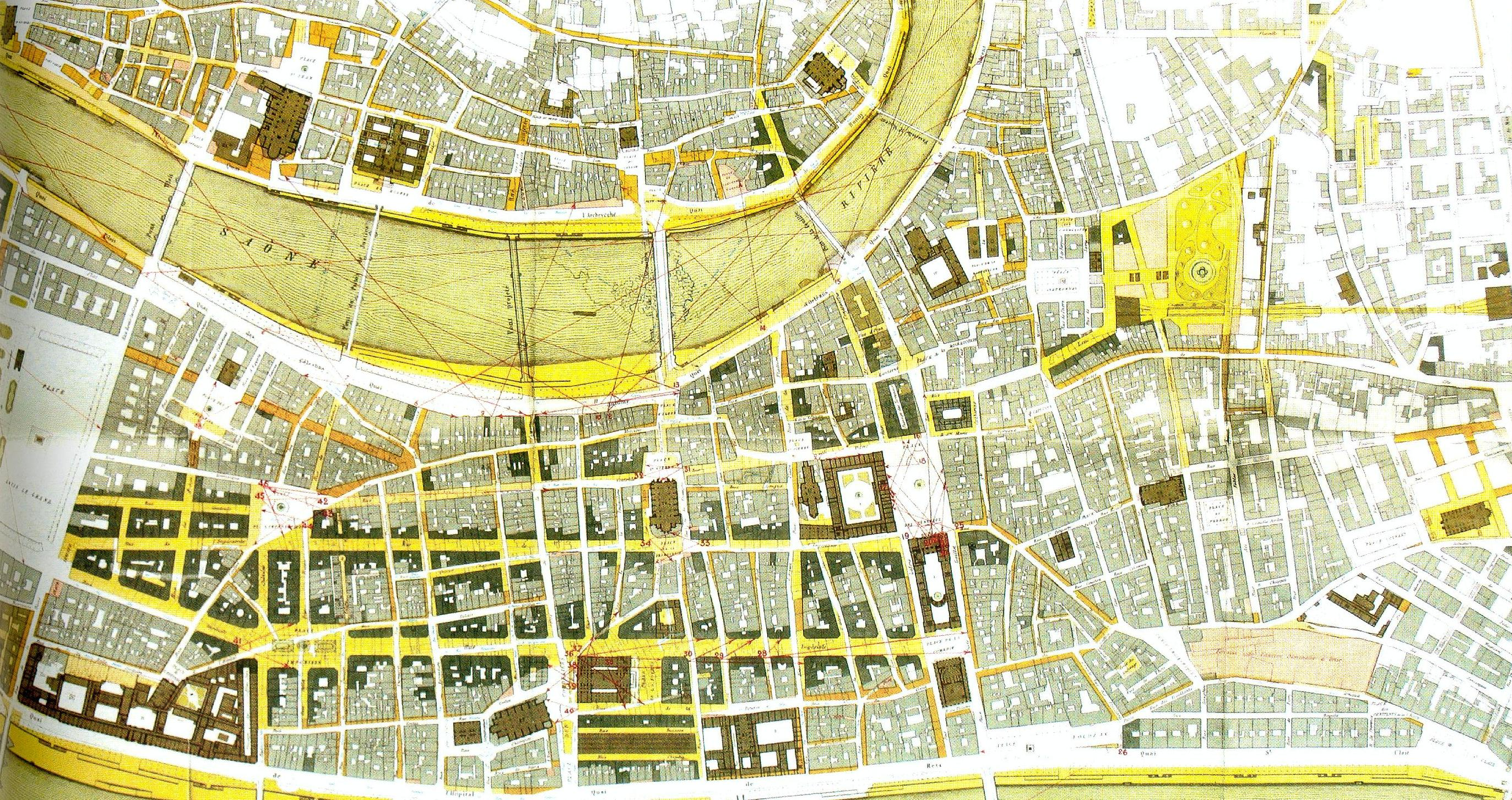
"Plan des améliorations réalisées ou projetées dans le centre de la ville de Lyon", by engineer Gustave Bonnet, 1863

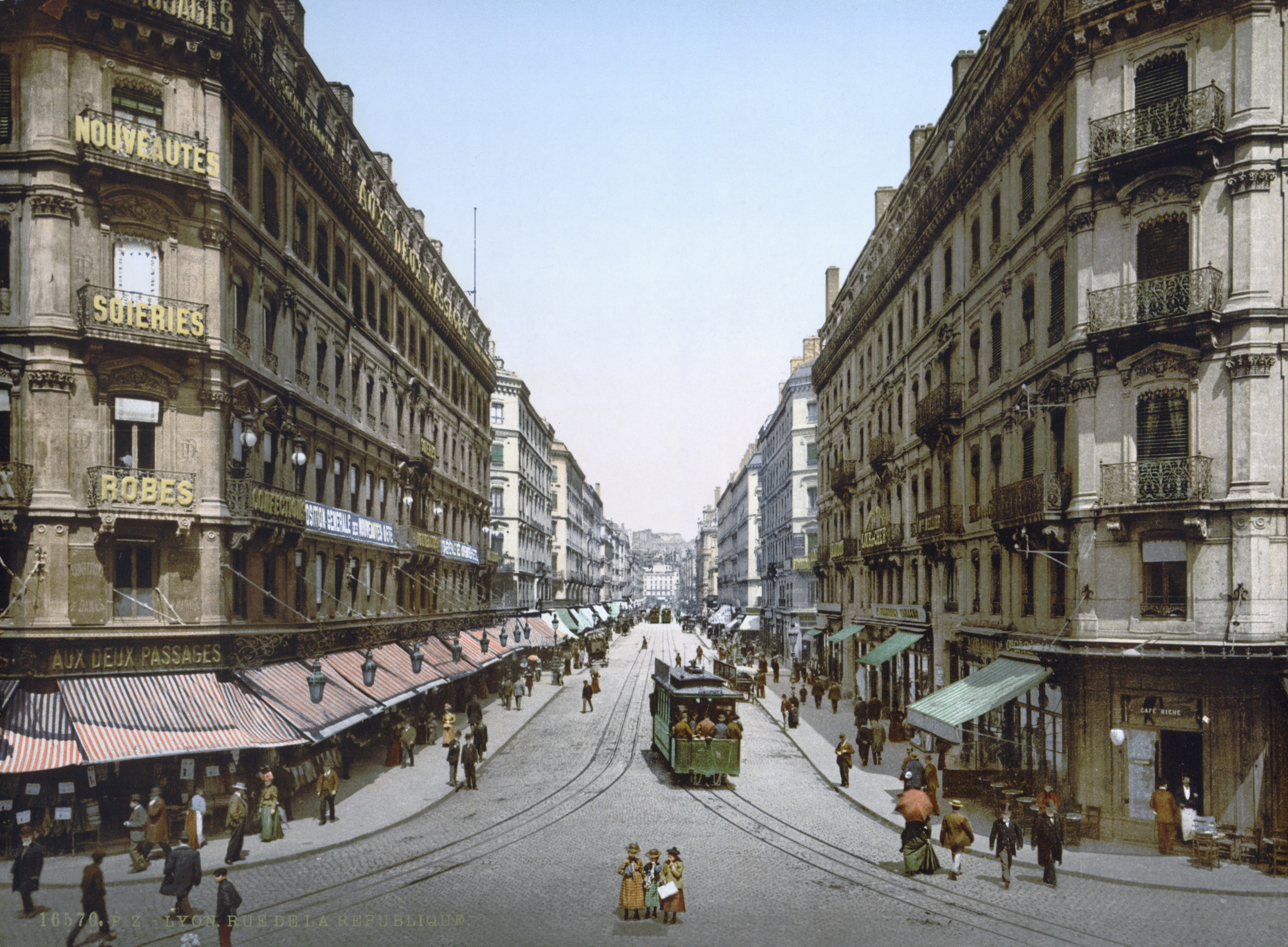
Rue de la République c. 1900

Two squares have been created on this occasion, both located along the Rue de la République: the Place Impériale (now the Place de la République) and the Place des Cordeliers. The street, long over a kilometre, follows a southwest–northeast axis from the Place Bellecour to the Place de la République, then a north–south axis to the Place Louis Pradel.

In 1894, President of France Sadi Carnot was assassinated just near the Palace of Commerce, located on the Place des Cordeliers. A red stone on the Rue de la République marks the place of the assassination.

In the 1970s, the construction of Lyon Metro Line A generated the digging of trenches on the entire street.

The location of the Rue de la République, in the center of the city, and its large number of shops make the street one of the most frequented ones of Lyon by day and night. It is also known by its apocope, "Rue de la Ré".

== Trades ==
Like the Avenue des Champs-Élysées in Paris, the Rue de la République attracts a large number of signs, including:

- Luxury shops
- Cheap shops, including Cheap (Prisunic), demolished in 2006, and the fast-food Mac Donald
- Cinemas such as Pathé Lyon-Bellecour and Pathé Lyon-Cordeliers (ex Nefs 8) and CNP Odéon both located in adjacent streets
- Major brands of distribution, such as Fnac Bellecour
- Many restaurants and cafeterias

== Notable monuments and buildings ==
The Rue de la République is lined with Haussman-style buildings, constructed in the 19th century when the street was created.

- The former headquarters of the newspaper Le Progrès, now occupied by Fnac Bellecour. There is a mosaic "RF" meaning "République Française". This building located at 85 Rue de la République was devised by Émile Étienne Guimet, initially for a theatre
- Cinema Pathé surmounted by a belfry with a rooster at the top, a rare example of Art Deco style in Lyon
- The Palais du Commerce or Palais de la Bourse, headquarters of Chambre de commerce et d'industrie de Lyon and the Bourse de Lyon, with the nearby Church of St. Bonaventure (Place des Cordeliers)
- The Nouveau Grand Bazar, occupied by shops. The building looks very modern by contrast with the surrounding ones
- The Hôtel de Ville and the Opéra Nouvel, both located at the north end of town, the Place de la Comédie.

== Gallery ==
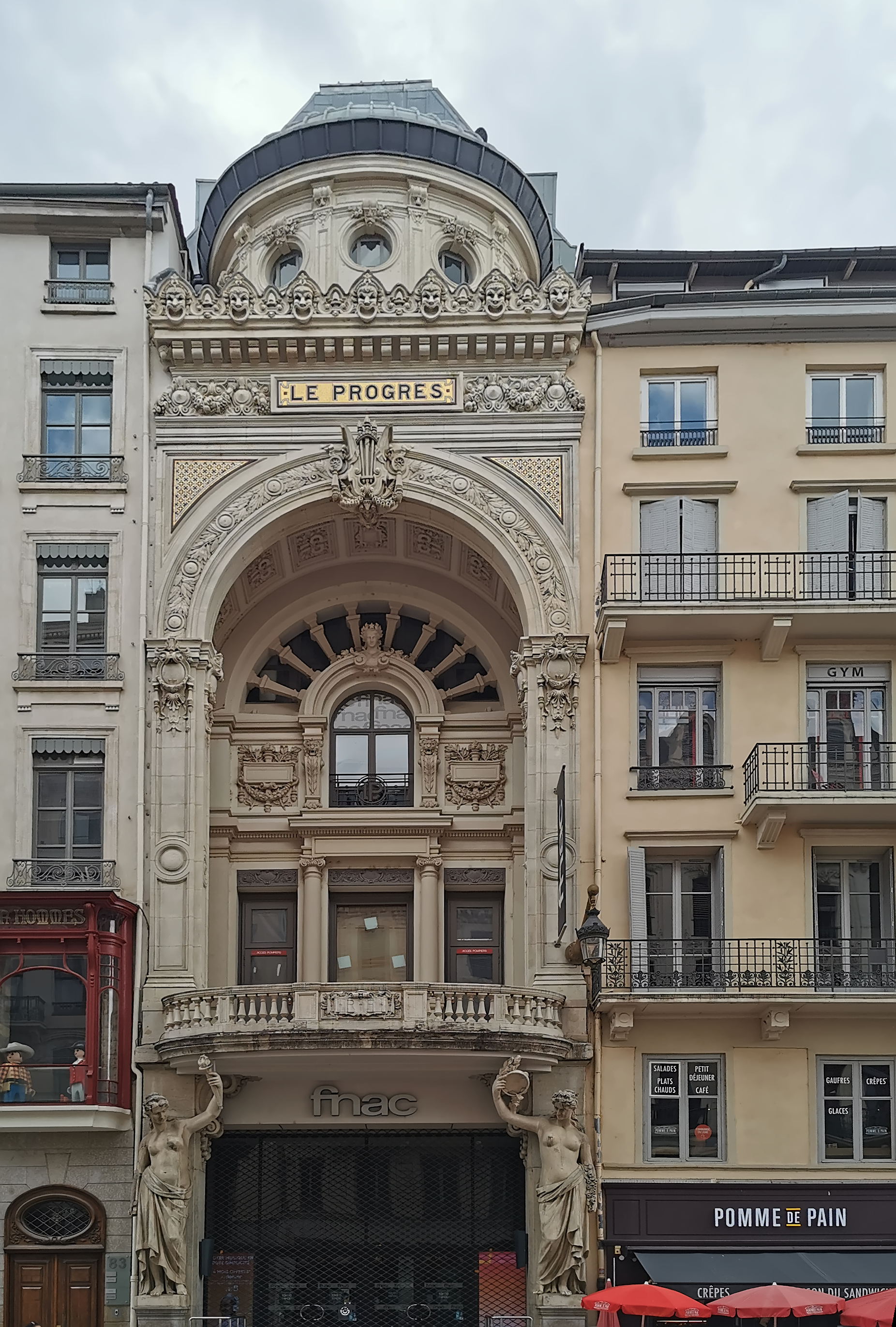
Fnac Bellecour, the former heardquarters of Le Progrès

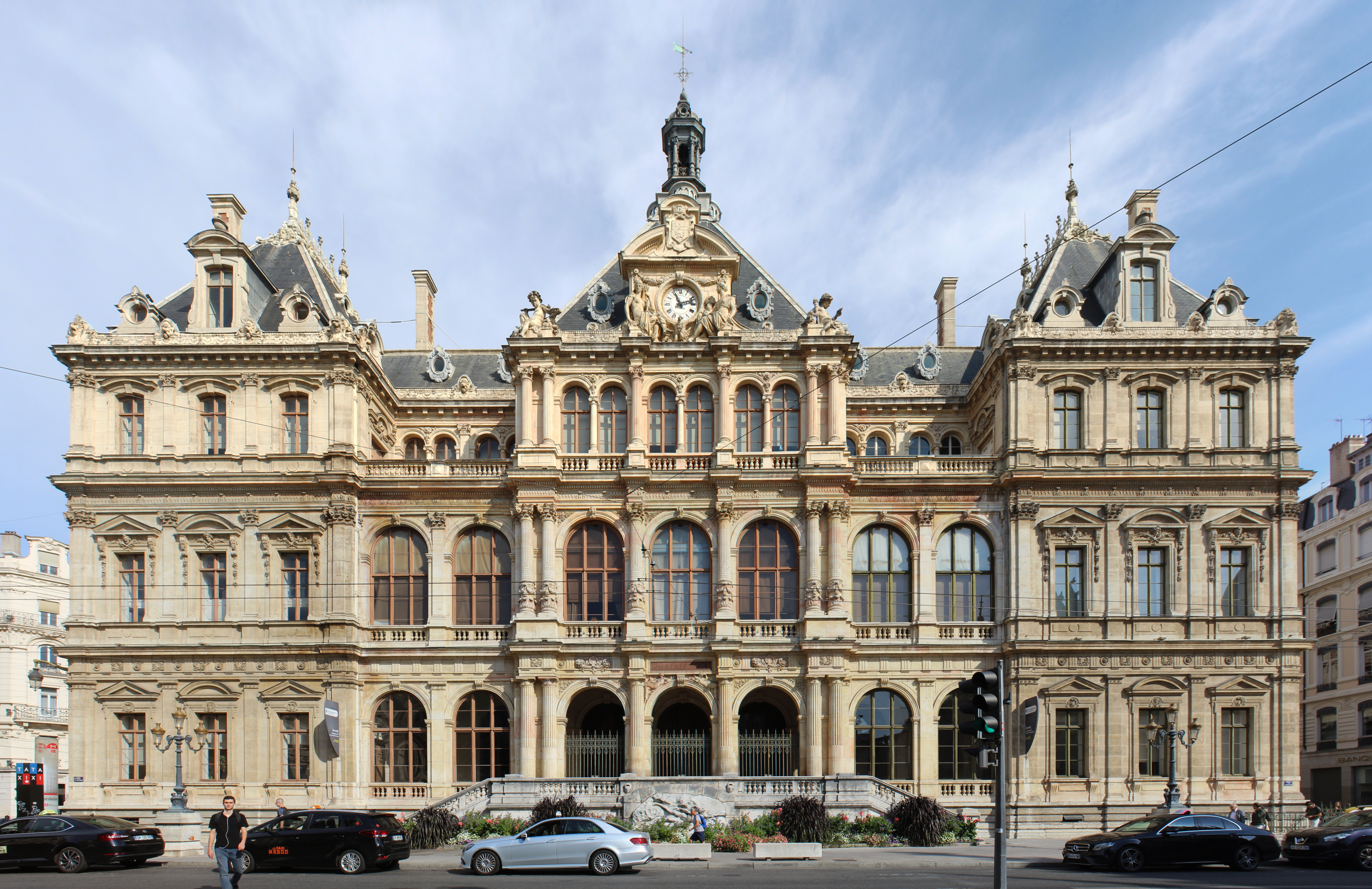
The Palais de la Bourse in 2019

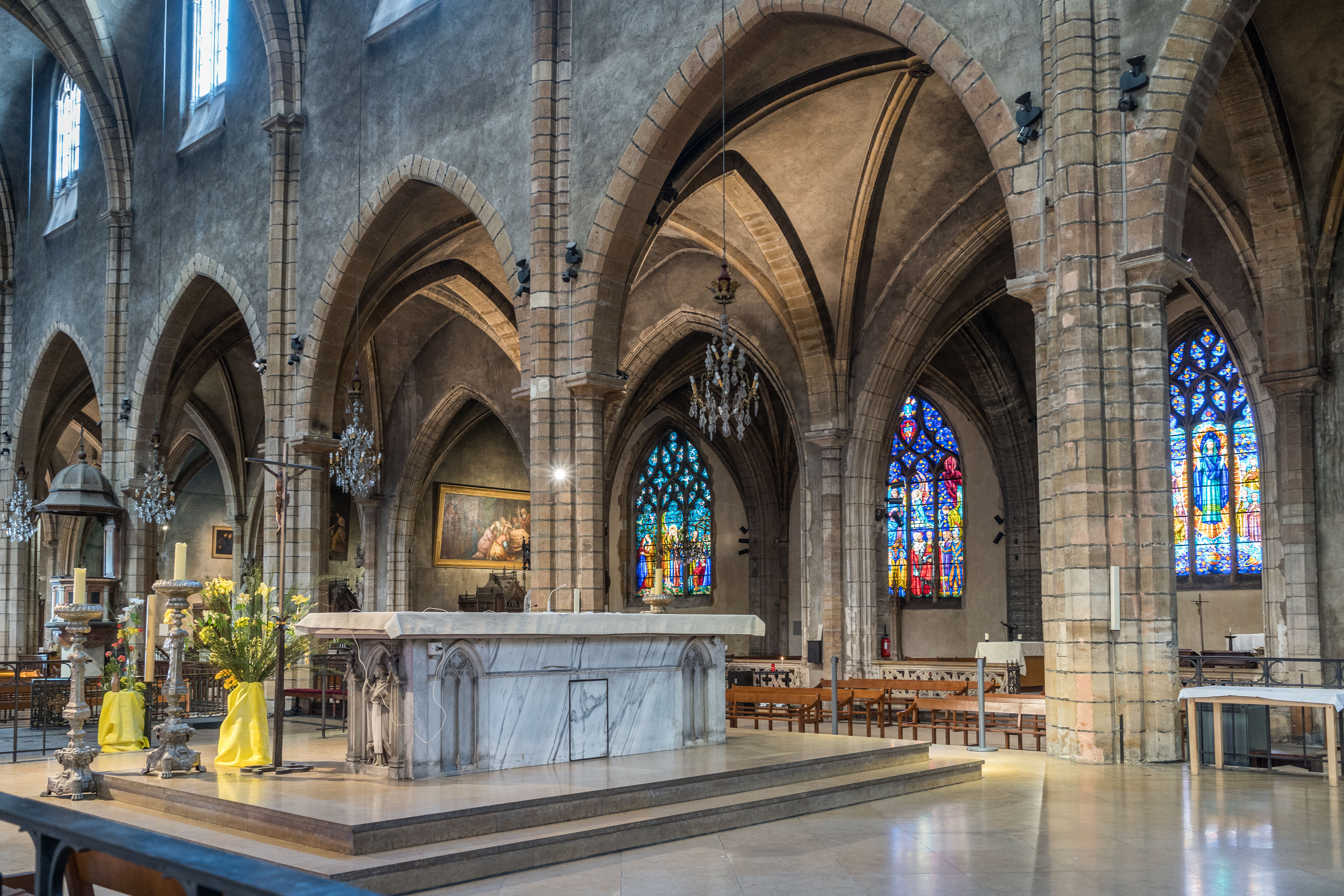
Interior of the Church of St. Bonaventure on the Place des Cordeliers, just east of the Rue de la République

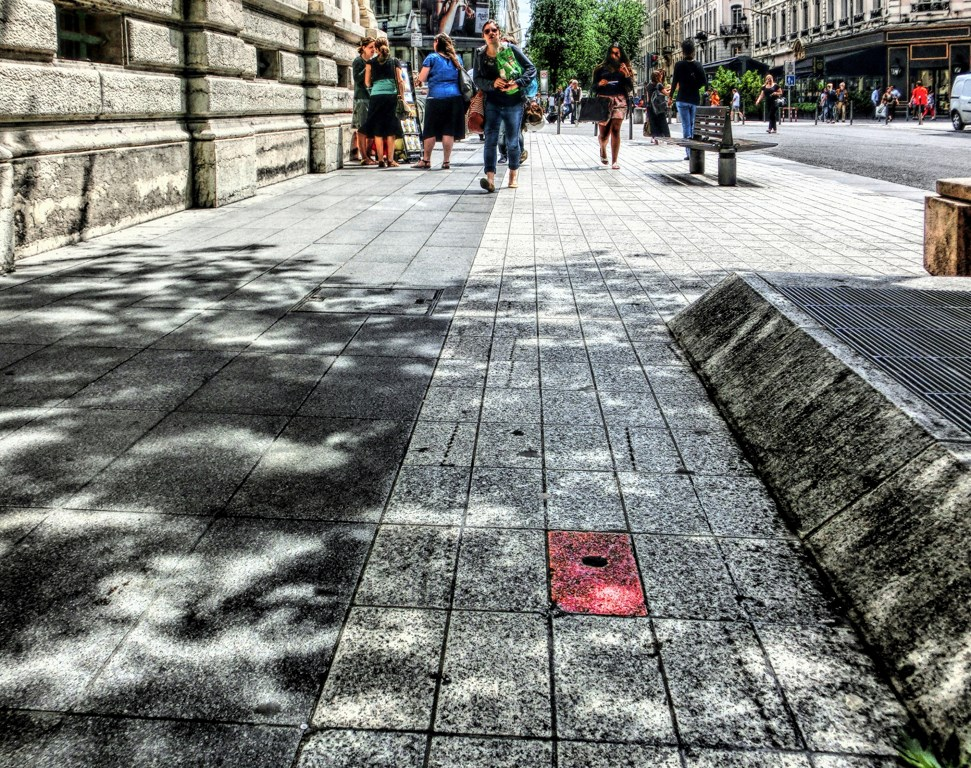
Red stone marking the place of the assassination of President Sadi Carnot on the Rue de la République in 1894
