= Chamber of Commerce and Industry of Lyon Metropole, Saint-Etienne and Roanne =

Chamber of commerce in Lyon, France

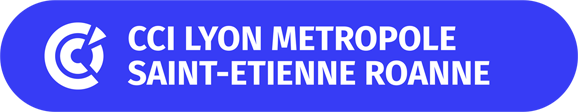
- Logo of the Chamber of Commerce

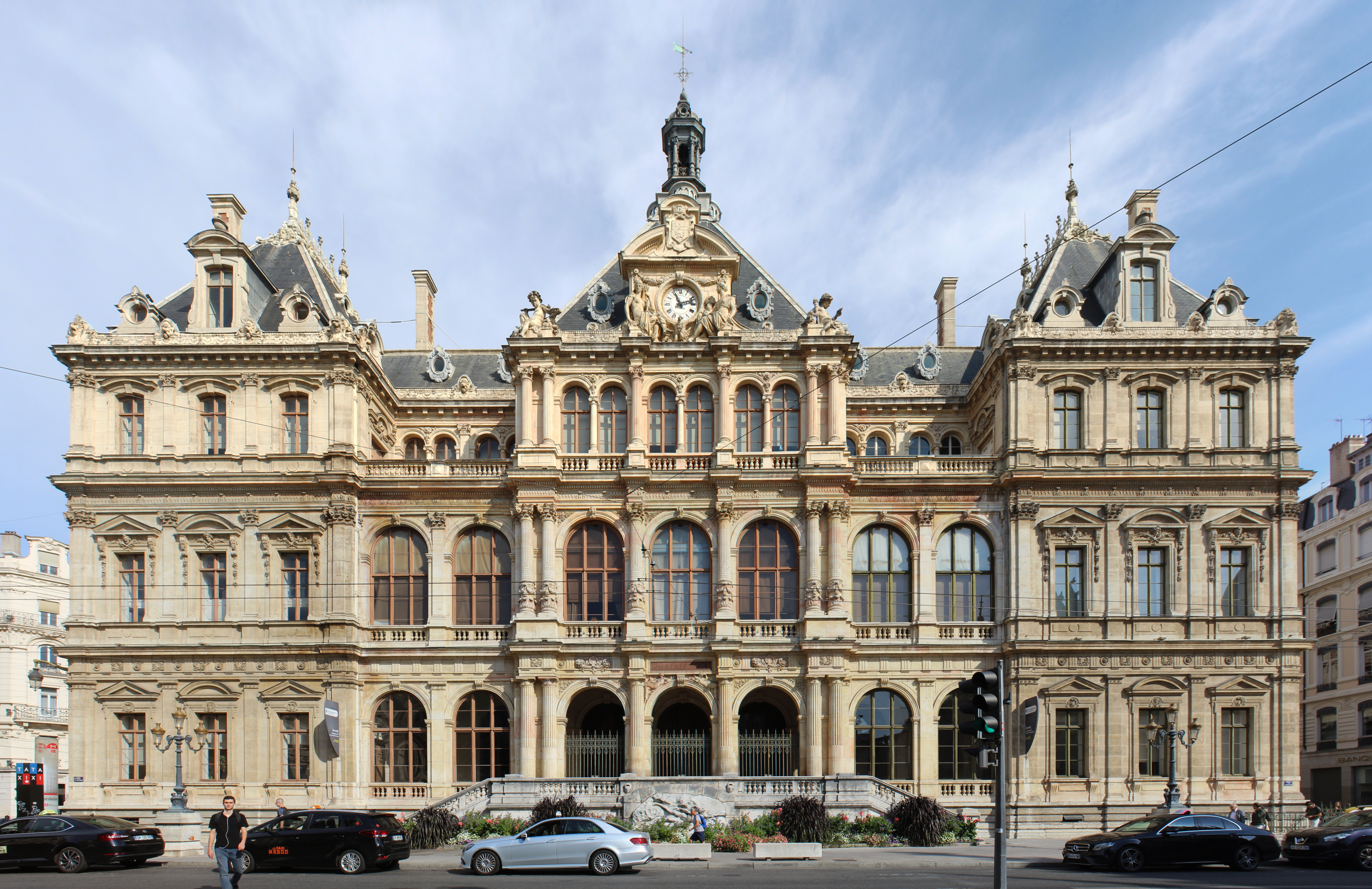
- Palais de la Bourse, Lyon, the headquarters of the Chamber of Commerce
- Formation: 1702
- Headquarters: Palais de la Bourse, 21 rue de la République, 69002 Lyon
- Coordinates: 45.763889°N 4.836389°E
- Website: https://www.lyon-metropole.cci.fr

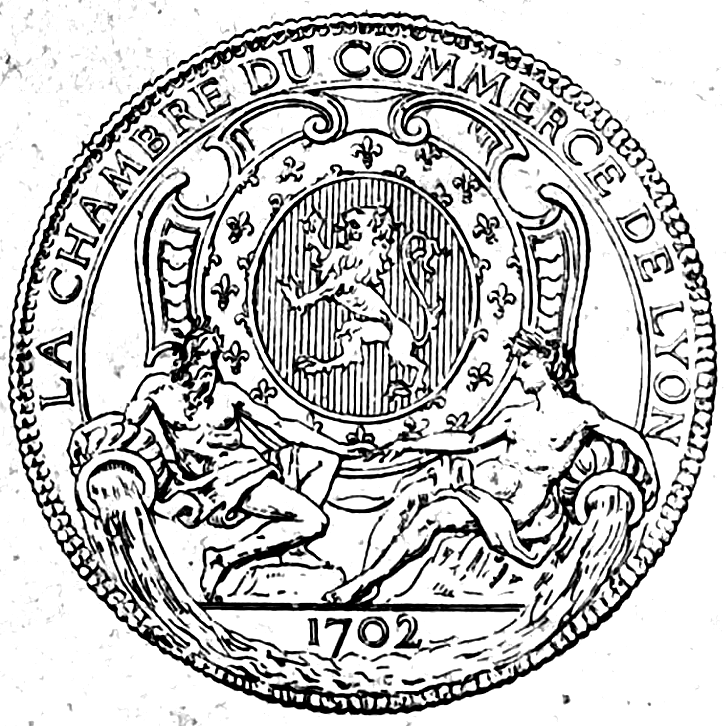
The original seal of the Lyon Chamber of Commerce, before its expansion and renaming.

The Chamber of Commerce and Industry of Lyon Metropole, Saint-Etienne and Roanne is one of the Chambers of Commerce and Industry of the Rhône department in France. Its headquarters is located in Lyon at the Palais de la Bourse.

It has 8 branches: Tarare, Limonest, Rillieux-la-Pape, Vaulx-en-Velin, Chassieu, Corbas, Givors. It is also part of the regional chamber of commerce and industry Rhône-Alpes.
