= Claude-Marius Vaïsse =

French politician (1799–1864)

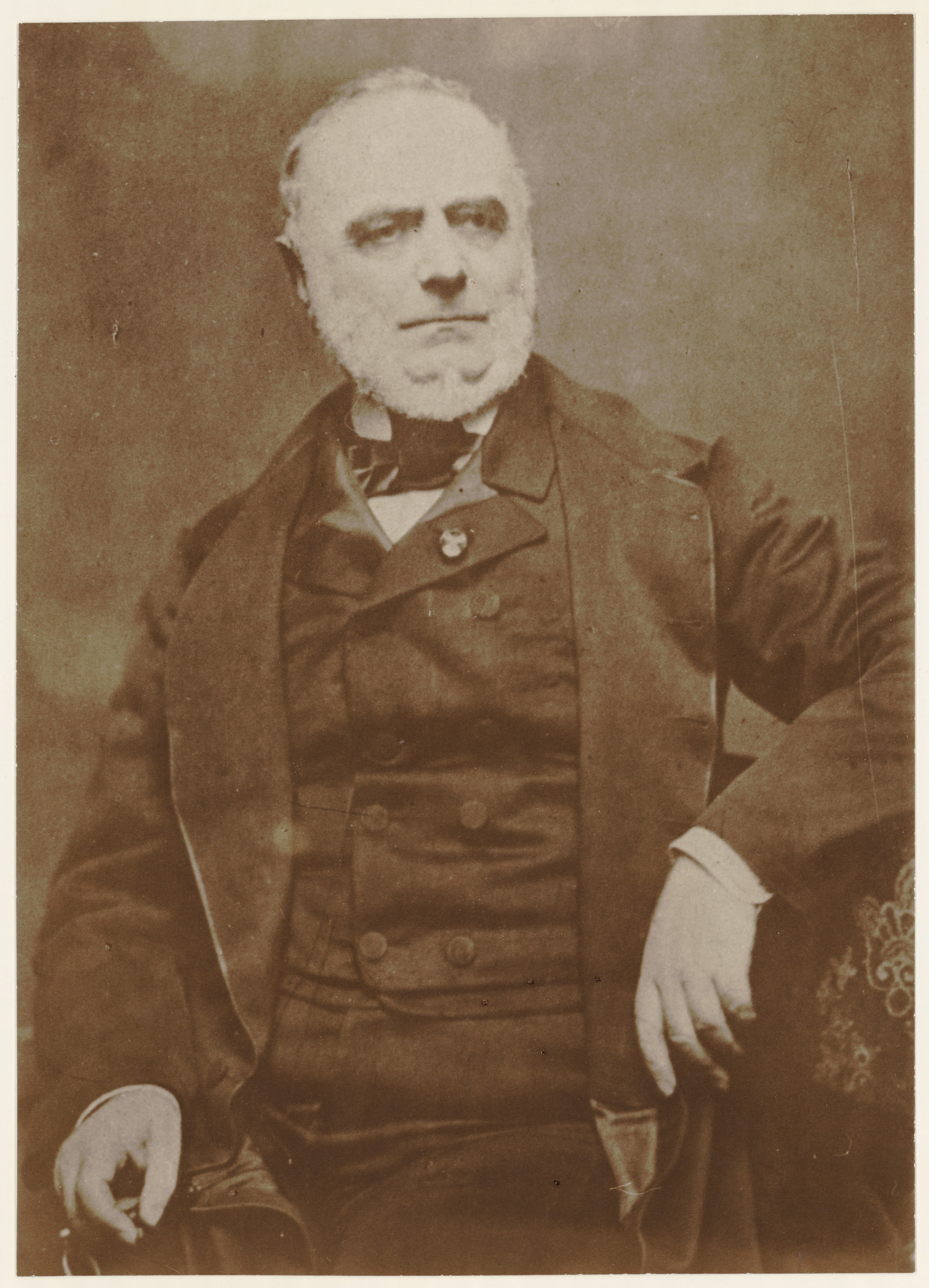
- Born: 8 July 1799; Marseille, France
- Died: 8 August 1864 (aged 65); Lyon, France
- Occupation: Politician
- Known for: Lyon urban design

Claude-Marius Vaïsse (8 July 1799 – 8 August 1864) was a French lawyer who joined the administration of the July Monarchy. During the French Second Republic he was briefly Minister of the Interior. Under the Second French Empire he was appointed prefect of the Rhône department. He was called the "Hausmann of Lyon" for his work on urban design in Lyon.

== Early years ==
Claude-Marius Vaïsse was born in Marseille, Bouches -du- Rhône, on 8 August 1799. He studied law, and began to practice in Marseille as an avoué. Under the Bourbon Restoration he showed that he had strong Liberal views. After the July Revolution in 1830 he sold his practice and became Secretary General of the prefecture of Bouches-du-Rhône. He went to Algeria with General Danrémont, and was named Director of Civil Affairs in Algiers in 1837. After the death of the general at the siege of Constantine, he became sub-prefect of Saint-Quentin. He was prefect of Pyrénées-Orientales from 1842 to 1848.

== Second Republic and Second Empire ==
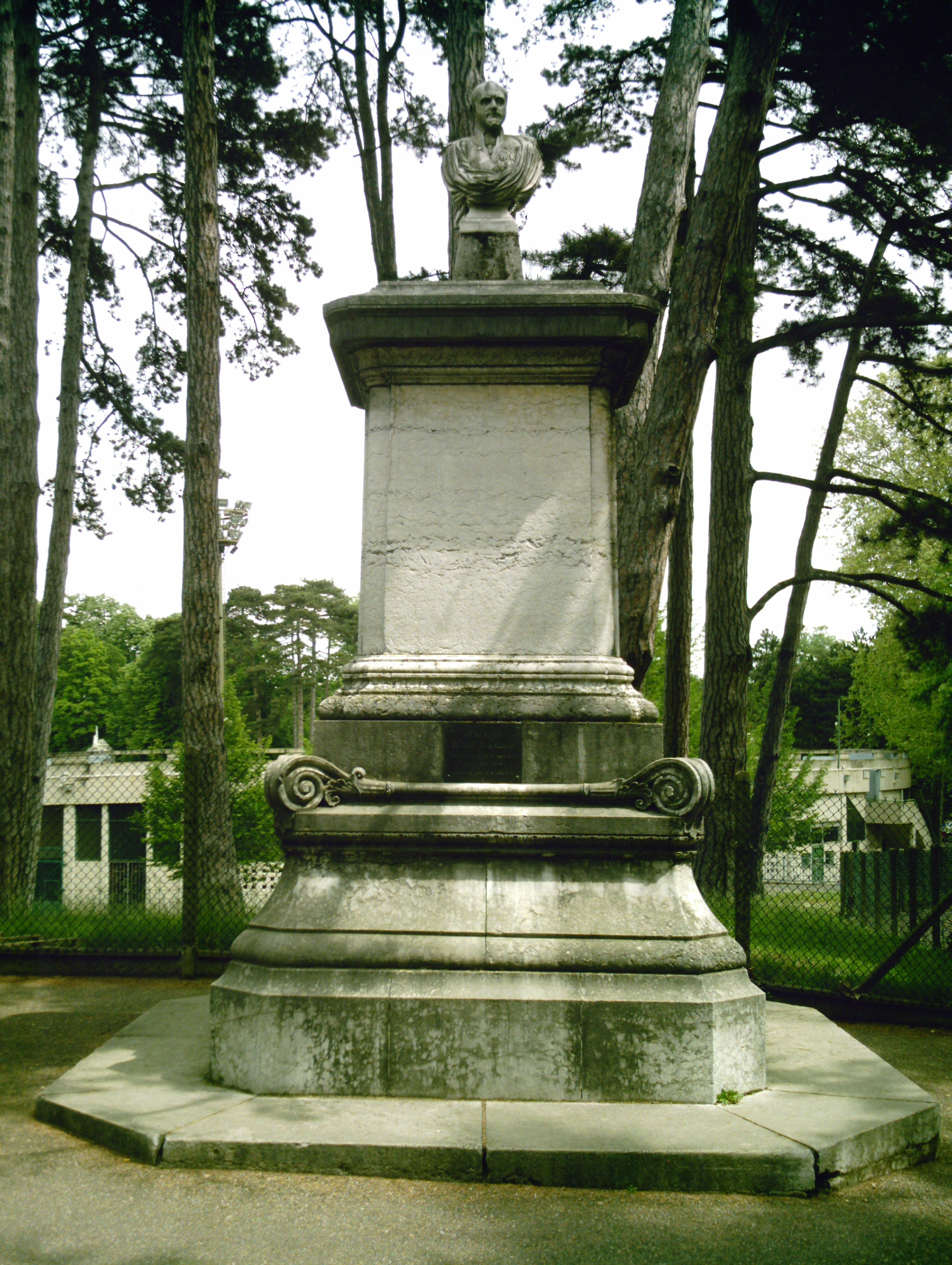
Statue of Vaïsse, in the Parc de la Tête d'Or

Vaïsse was dismissed by the interim government after the February Revolution of 1848. He aligned himself with the policy of Louis-Napoleon Bonaparte, and was appointed Prefect of the Nord department in December 1848. He performed his duties with zeal, and on 24 January 1851 was appointed Minister of the Interior in the Petit ministère of 1851, holding office until 10 April 1851. He was elected a deputy for the Nord on 27 July 1851. Vaïsse supported the coup d'état of 2 December 1851 in which Napoleon seized power. He was made a member of the Consultative Commission, then the Council of State.

In 1853 Vaïsse was made Inspector of prefectures. In March 1854 he was given responsibility for the administration of the Rhône department. In Lyon he undertook major transformations and embellishments. He cleared the routes for several new streets, built the Exchange and restored the City Hall. He established a vast network of canals and aqueducts. On 19 June 1854 he was made a senator. In his votes he always supported the imperial government.

Vaïsse was awarded the Grand Cross of the Legion of Honor. He died in Lyon, Rhône, on 29 August 1864. A memorial pays tribute to him in the Parc de la Tête d'Or (on the Belvedere, near the velodrome) and a small street named after him in the 6th arrondissement of Lyon, between the Avenue Foch and the Place d'Helvétie.

== Main works under his direction ==
- Parc de la Tête d'Or
- Rues Impériale (Rue de la République) et de l'Impératrice (Édouard Herriot)
- Gare de Lyon-Perrache
- Palais de la Bourse et du Commerce
- The Hospital of La Croix-Rousse
- Creation of the Compagnie Lyonnaise des Omnibus in 1855
- Hôtel de Ville, Lyon, rebuilt after a fire

== See also ==
- List of Interior Ministers of France
