= List of streets and squares in Lyon =

This article lists the main streets and squares in Lyon, France.

== A ==
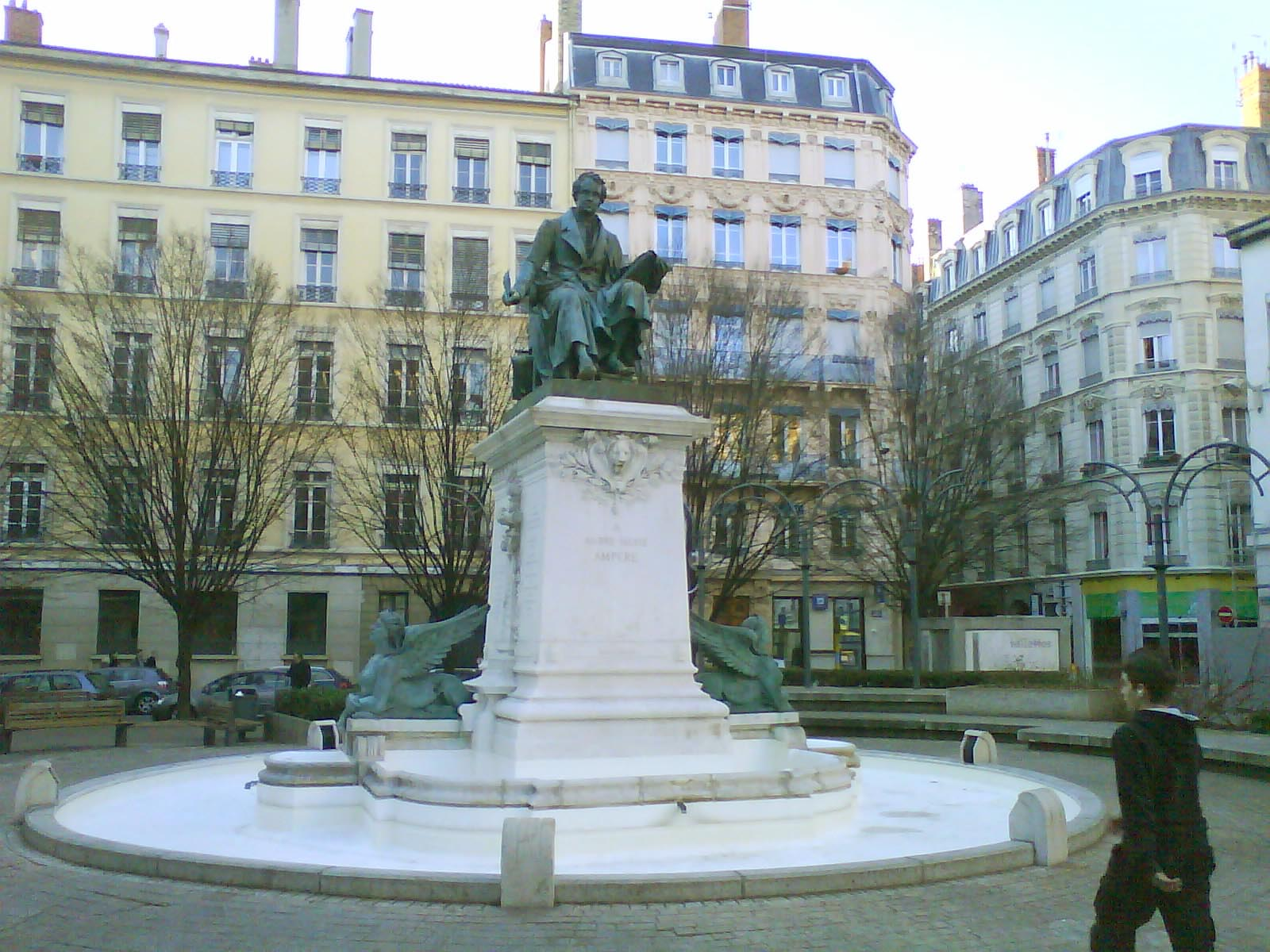
La Place Ampère

- Place Ambroise-Courtois
- Place Ampère
- Rue Antoine Sallès
- Cours Albert Thomas
- Rue de l'Arbre-Sec
- Rue des Archers
- Passage de l'Argue
- Rue Armand Calliat, named for Thomas-Joseph Armand-Calliat, goldsmith, who died in Lyon in 1901.
- Place d'Arsonval
- Rue d'Austerlitz

== B ==
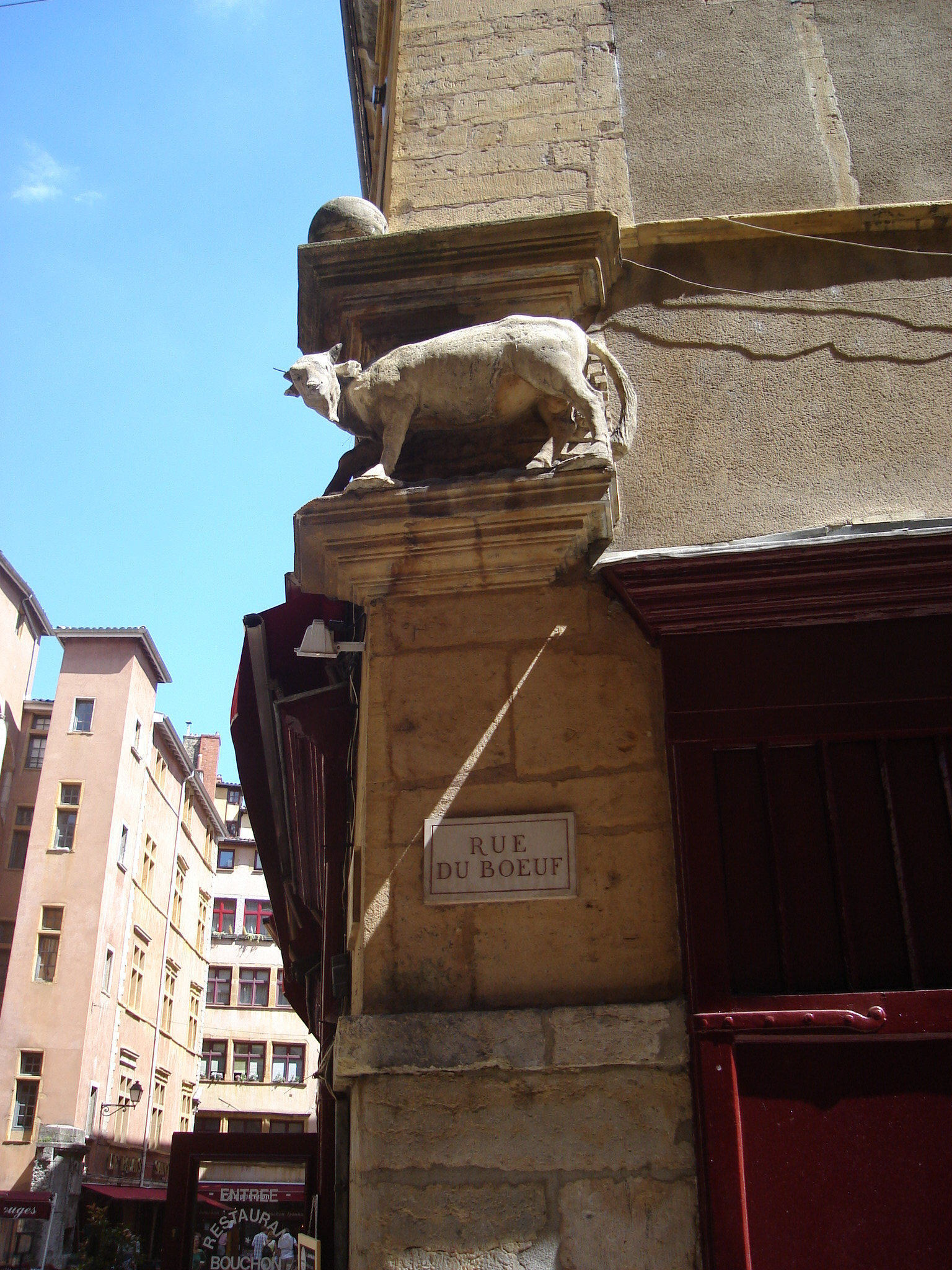
La Rue du Bœuf

- Rue du Bât-d'Argent
- Boulevard des Belges
- Place Bellecour
- Place Benoît-Crépu
- Rue du Sergent Blandan
- Rue Bichat
- Rue Bossuet
- Rue des Bouquetiers
- Rue de la Bourse
- Boulevard des Brotteaux
- Rue de Brest
- Rue Burdeau
- Rue du Bœuf
- Rue Bugeaud
- Avenue Berthelot

== C ==
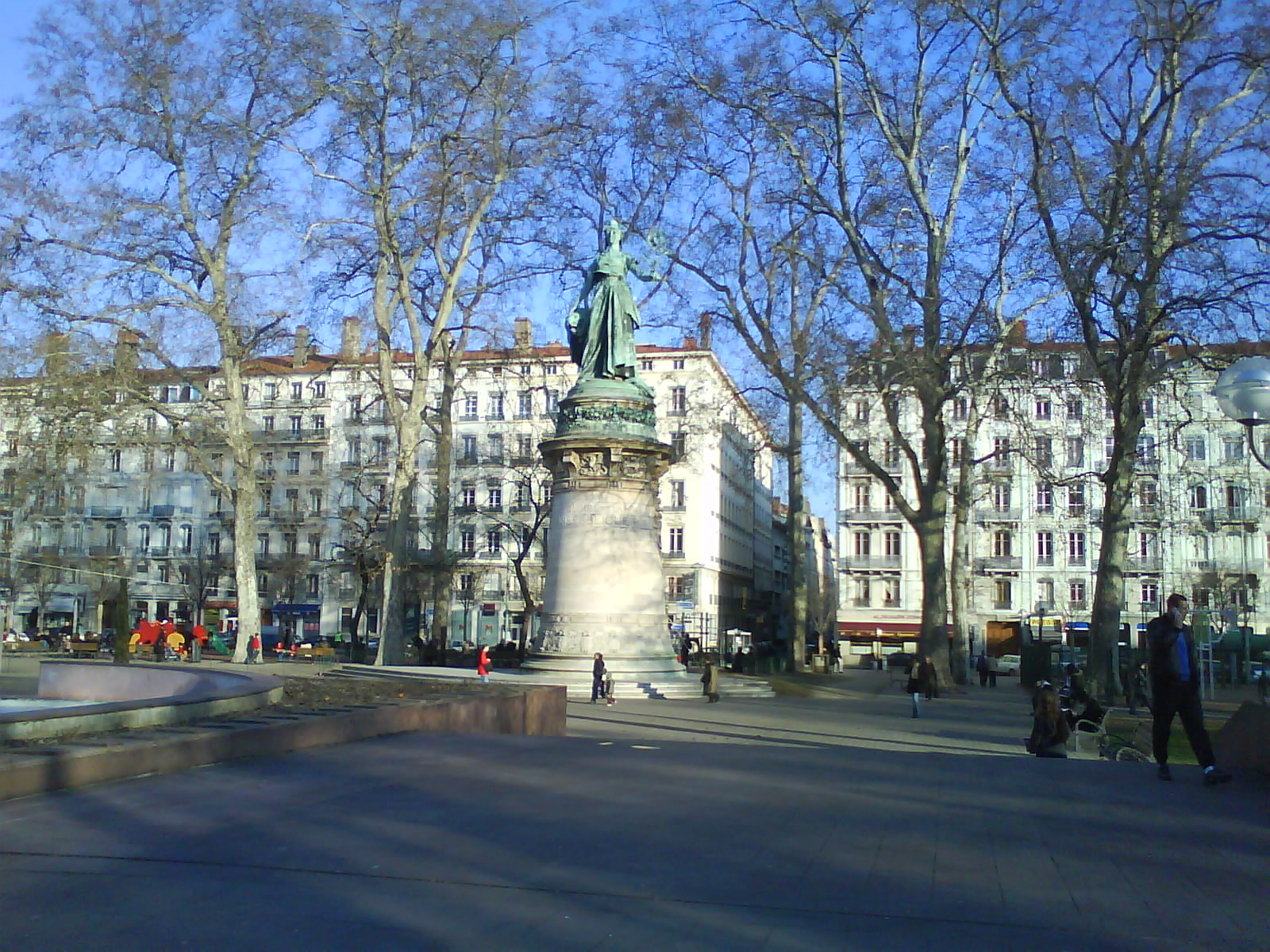
Place Carnot

- Boulevard des Canuts
- Rue des Capucins
- Montée des Carmélites
- Place Carnot
- Rue du Président Carnot
- Place des Célestins
- Cours Charlemagne
- Rue des Chartreux
- Rue Chevreul
- Rue Claudia
- Rue Constantine
- Rue de Créqui
- Place Croix-Paquet
- Boulevard de la Croix-Rousse
- Grande rue de la Croix-Rousse
- Place de la Croix-Rousse

== D ==
- Rue Dubois
- Rue Duquesne
- Rue Dumenge
- Rue du Dauphiné
- Rue Duguesclin
- Rue Docteur Bonhomme
- Rue Docteur Rebatel

== E ==
- Rue Edmond-Locard
- Boulevard des États-unis
- Rue Édouard-Herriot

== F ==
- Avenue Foch (Lyon)
- Rue du Fort Saint-Irénée
- Avenue des Frères Lumière
- Cours Franklin Roosevelt

== G ==
- Rue de Gadagne
- Cours Gambetta
- Rue Garibaldi
- Montée du Gourguillon
- Rue Grenette
- Grande rue de la Guillotière
- Montée de la Grande Côte

== H ==
- Rue Hénon
- Rue Henri-Germain

== I ==
- Rue d'Ivry

== J ==
- Place des Jacobins
- Avenue Jean Jaurès
- Quai Jean-Moulin (Lyon)
- Boulevard Jean XXIII
- Juiverie

== K ==
- Place Kléber (Lyon)

== L ==
- Avenue Lacassagne
- Cours Lafayette
- Rue Lainerie
- Rue Lanterne
- Rue René Leynaud, named for the journalist, poet and Resistance fighter, born in Lyons in 1910.
- Cours de la Liberté
- Rue Longue

== M ==
- Rue Marietton
- Rue des Marronniers
- Rue de Marseille
- Rue Molière
- Rue Montgolfier
- Rue Monseigneur-Lavarenne
- Rue Mazard
- Rue Mercière
- Rue de Montbrillant
- Rue Malesherbes

== N ==
- Place Neuve Saint-Jean

== P ==
- Rue Pasteur
- Rue du Bon Pasteur
- Quai de la Pêcherie
- Rue Pernon
- Quai Perrache
- Avenue du Point-du-Jour
- Place du Point-du-Jour
- Rue de la Poulaillerie
- Rue du Professeur-Patel

== Q ==
- Rue de la Quarantaine

== R ==
- Place Rhodiacéta
- Rue Ruplinger
- Rue de la République
- Rue Romarin
- Quai Romain Rolland
- Rue Rachais
- Rue Royale

== S ==
- Quai Saint-Antoine
- Rue Sainte-Catherine
- Rue Saint-Georges
- Rue Saint-Jean
- Rue Gabriel Sarrazin
- Place Sathonay
- Avenue de Saxe
- Rue Soeur Bouvier
- Cours Suchet

== T ==
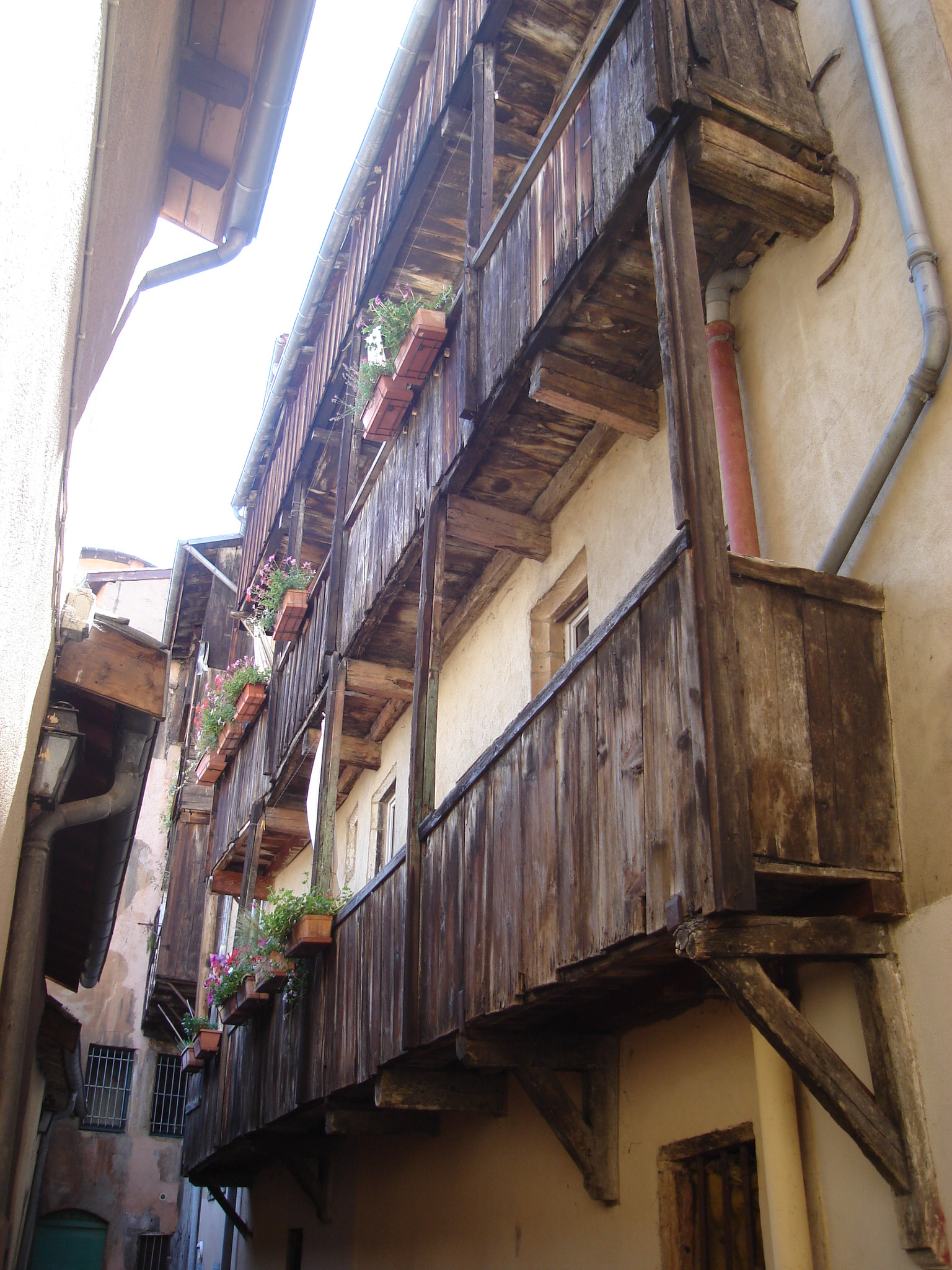
L'impasse Turquet à Lyon

- Rue Terme
- Place des Terreaux
- Avenue Thiers
- Passage Thiaffait
- Rue Thomassin
- Avenue Tony-Garnier
- Place de la Trinité
- Place de Trion
- Rue de Trion
- Rue Tronchet
- Impasse Turquet

== U ==
- Rue de l'Université

== V ==
- Rue Vauban
- Cours de Verdun
- Rue Victor-Hugo
- Rue de la Vieille
- Rue Villon
- Cours Vitton
- Grande rue de Vaise
- Rue Vide-Bourse
- Rue de Vendôme
- Boulevard Vivier Merle
- Rue de La Vilette
- Cour des Voraces

== See also ==
- Arrondissements of Lyon
- Montée Saint-Clair-Duport
- Lyon
- Montchat
