= Passage de l'Argue =

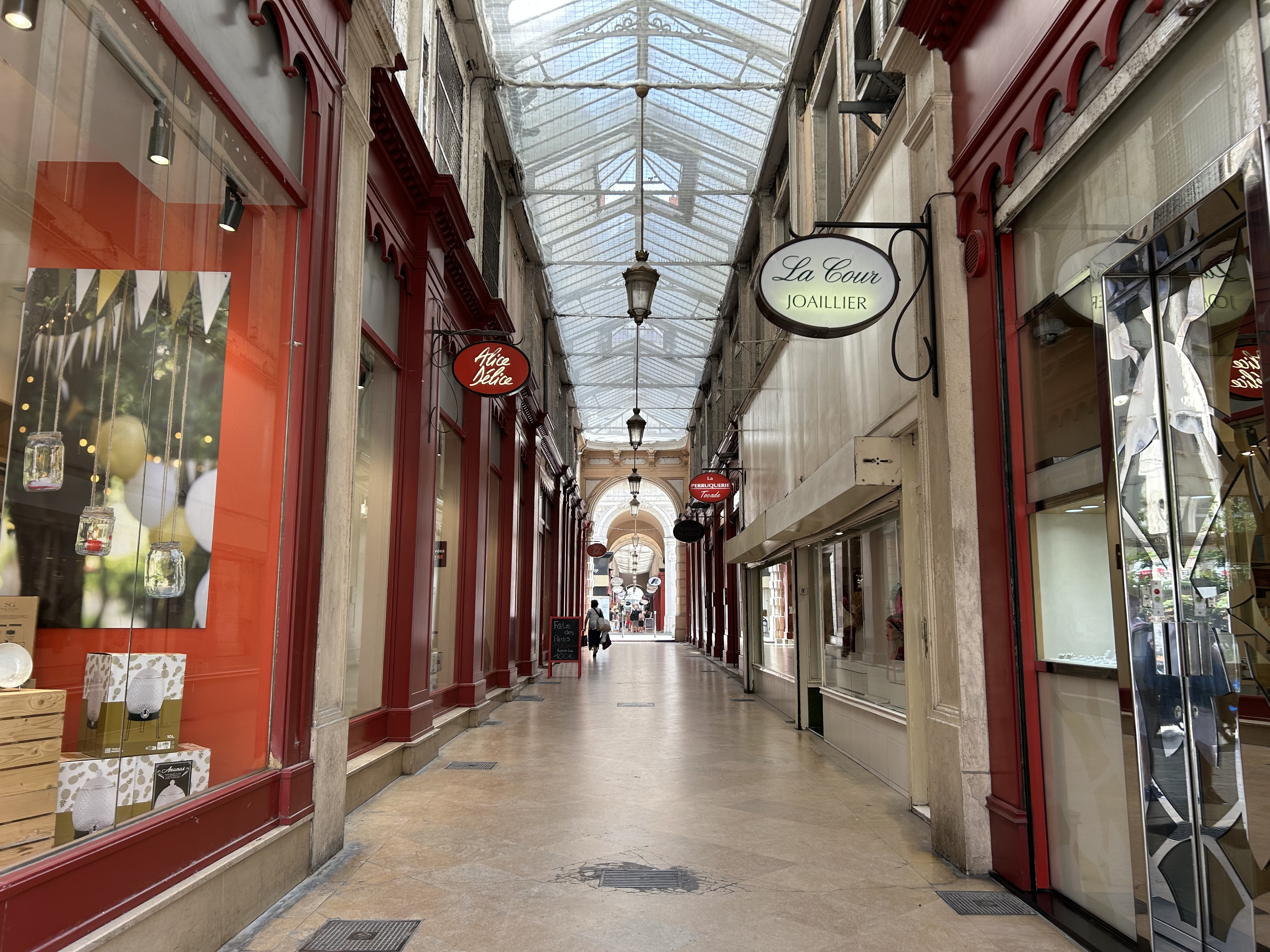
- The arcade in 2025, seen from Place des Jacobins.
- Interactive map of Passage de l'Argue
- Location: 2nd arrondissement, Lyon, France
- Postal code: 69002
- Coordinates: 45.761144°N 4.834762°E

Construction
- Construction start: 1825
- Inauguration: 1828

The Passage de l'Argue (French pronunciation: [pasaʒ də laʁɡ]) is a covered arcade in the Bellecour quarter, in the 2nd arrondissement of Lyon, which connects the Rue de la République to the Rue Édouard-Herriot and the Rue de Brest. It is continued across the Rue de Brest by the Petit Passage de l'Argue, which was part of the main passage until the road was constructed. The Passage de l'Argue is one of the oldest arcades in the French provinces, built at the same period and on the same model as Parisian arcades. Home to many luxury retailers, it plays a significant role in the trade of the Presqu'île.

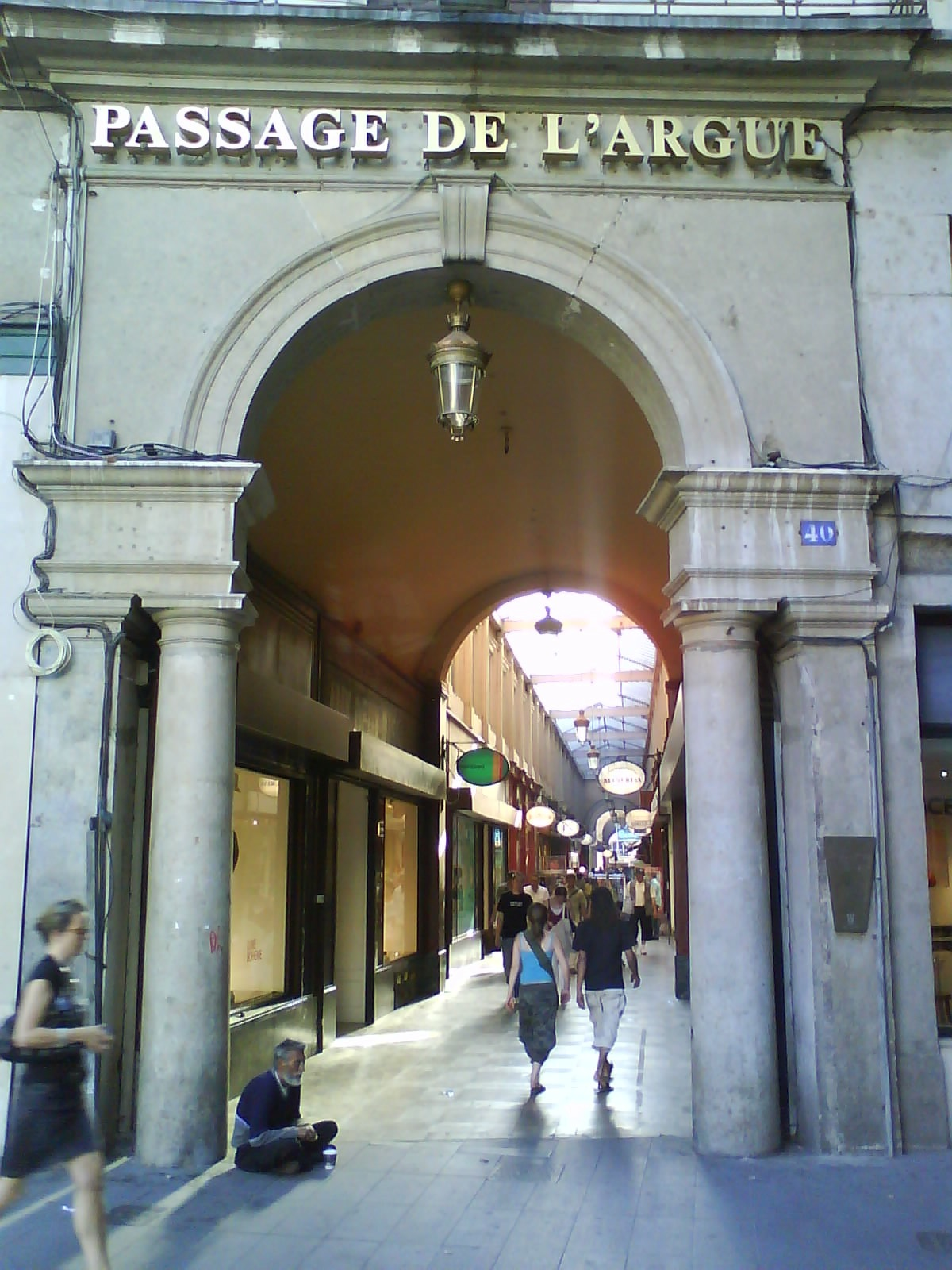
Exterior view

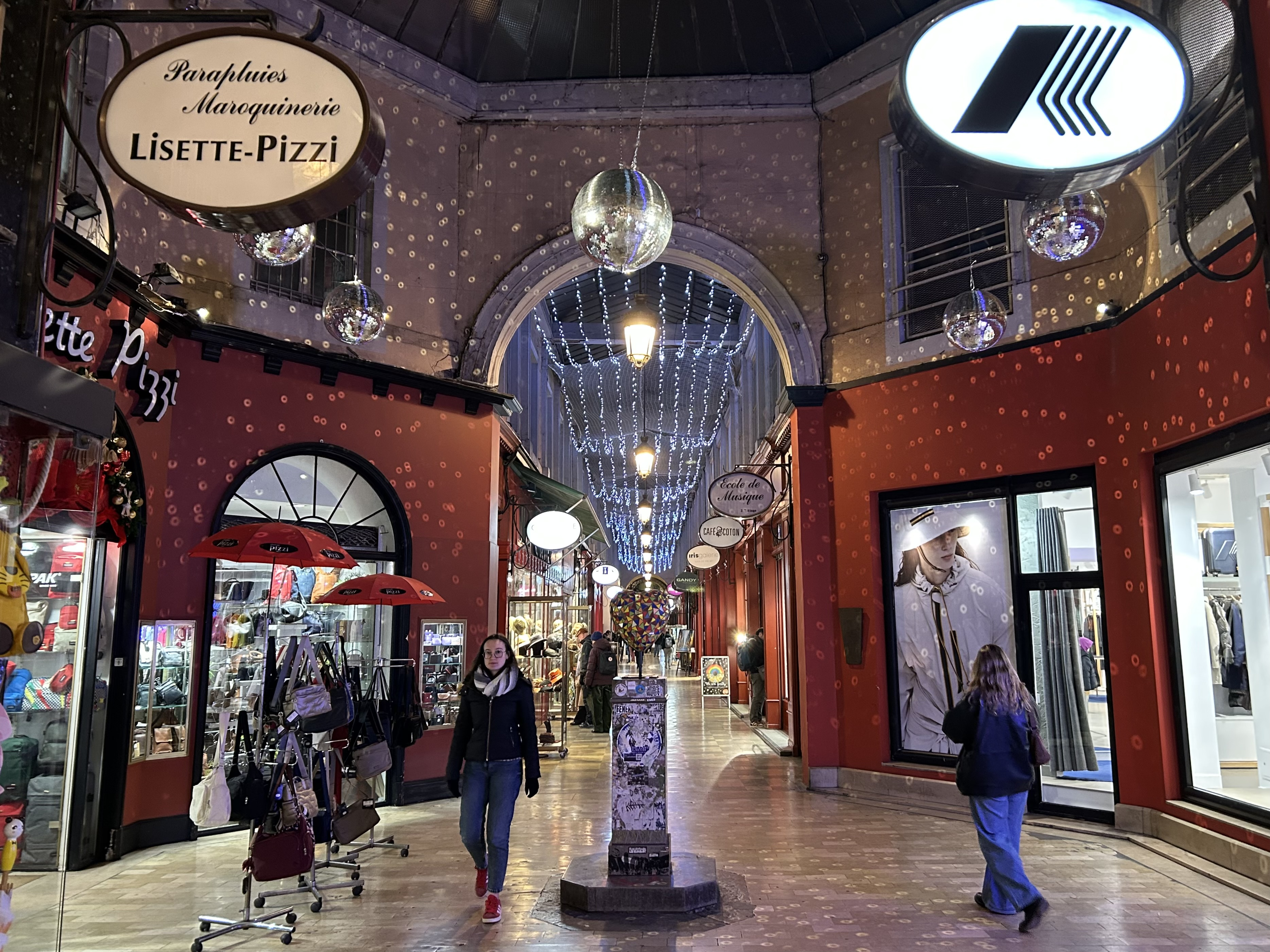
Illuminations in the arcade, November 2025

== History ==
The word argue (from Greek arguros, which means "silver coin / money" in English) refers to the wire drawing machine for gold and silver bullions used for weaving. One of the two royal French mints was situated a few blocks away from the Passage de l'Argue on the Rue de la Monnaie; the other was in Paris.

The Passage de l'Argue is already recorded on the city map made in 1740 by Claude Séraucourt, but was then an alley lined by fifteen weavers' workshops. There was also a bullion mint, abolished in the late 18th century, but restored by the French Directory in 1798. The old buildings were bought and demolished by Coste, Casati, Dugueyt, and Millon and construction of the arcade began in 1825 to designs by the architect Vincent Farge; it opened three years later. In 1834, during the Canut revolts, Republicans took refuge in the passage and it was ransacked. In November 1840, the passage was flooded after heavy rains.

Gas lighting was installed early in the Passage de l'Argue; installation of a gasometer was requested in October 1828. The gas was prepared in the Rue Tupin-Rompu. The city of Lyon provided the lighting and also maintained the paving of the passage. An 1828 ordinance forbade shouting and hawking wares inside.

Many notable buildings have lined the passage. The Atelier de l'Argue, demolished in the late sixteenth century, was restored by a decree of 15 May 1798; it has since been reassigned to the Rue de la Savoie. On 2 March 1828, civil and military authorities participated in the inauguration of the Café-Théâtre. The theater had a circular auditorium with Corinthian and Ionic columns with rich entablatures and a richly decorated ceiling with chandelier, and was well attended, but went bankrupt. A renowned restaurant opened in 1836, and the Théâtre des Bouffes Lyonnaises in 1860. In 1862, Louis Josserand and his wife Gabrielle Avocat opened a Guignol theater, and the first marionette shows took place in 1899 in the Petit Passage de l'Argue.

Notable residents included the painters Julian Gubian (1834) and Perignon (1840).

== Architecture and monuments ==
In 1836, the Passage de l'Argue had 96 arches with uniform closures. North of the open-air rotunda, it had two stories; south of it, one story. The entrance was formed by an arch whose archivolt is supported by Doric columns. The architecture resembles that of Italian galleries in Rome and Milan.

Although cut into two parts by the Rue Édouard-Herriot under the Second Empire, the passage has retained its character. The four main entrances are in neo-classical style; the passageway is roofed in glass with central suspended lanterns. Shop-fronts are wood and are voluntarily kept similar in appearance. There are a variety of shops, most selling luxury goods, including watches, pipes, clothing accessories, home decor, and gifts.

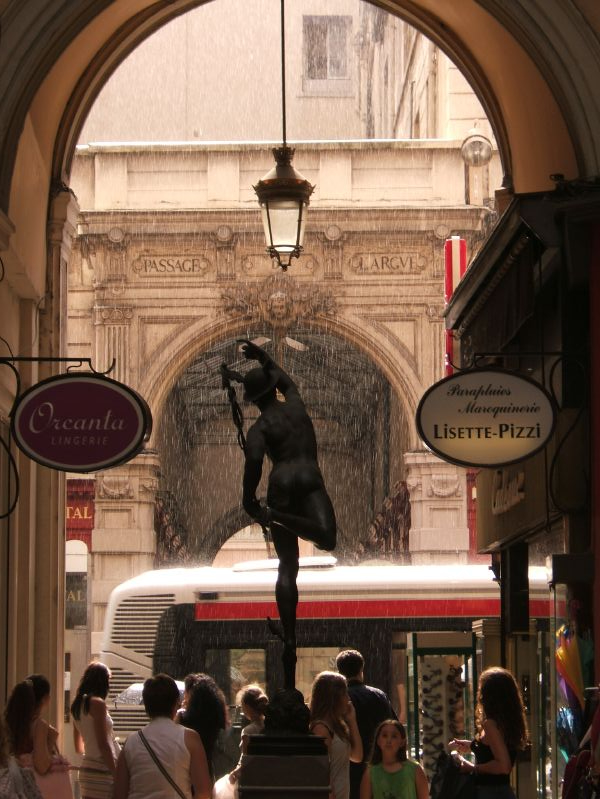
The statue of Mercury and the arcade captured in 2005.

The east entrance, at the Rue Édouard-Herriot, is decorated with two sculpted gryphons, signed by Rodolphe Galli. In the central rotunda is a statue of the Roman god Mercury, patron of merchants and travelers. Three of these statues have been erected, but not in exactly the same place. The first was stolen in 1902; the second, a reproduction of the work by the Renaissance sculptor Giambologna, was removed by the occupying Germans during World War II and melted down for armaments; the third, also a replica of Giambologna's work, was erected in April 1995 as part of a renovation of the arcade, but was stolen three days after its inauguration. It was reinstalled in October 1996, then stolen again in 2011.

== Reception ==
According to some sources, two thirds of the shops were rented before the arcade opened. The Passage de l'Argue was considered a "regeneration" for the quarter, and to have the same "charm" as the Parisian arcades. One author described such arcades as "a place of refuge, for walking on winter evenings and rainy days, and thus an embellishment as well as a convenience for the entire population of the city".

== See also ==
- Traboule
