= Rue des Archers =

Street in Lyon, France

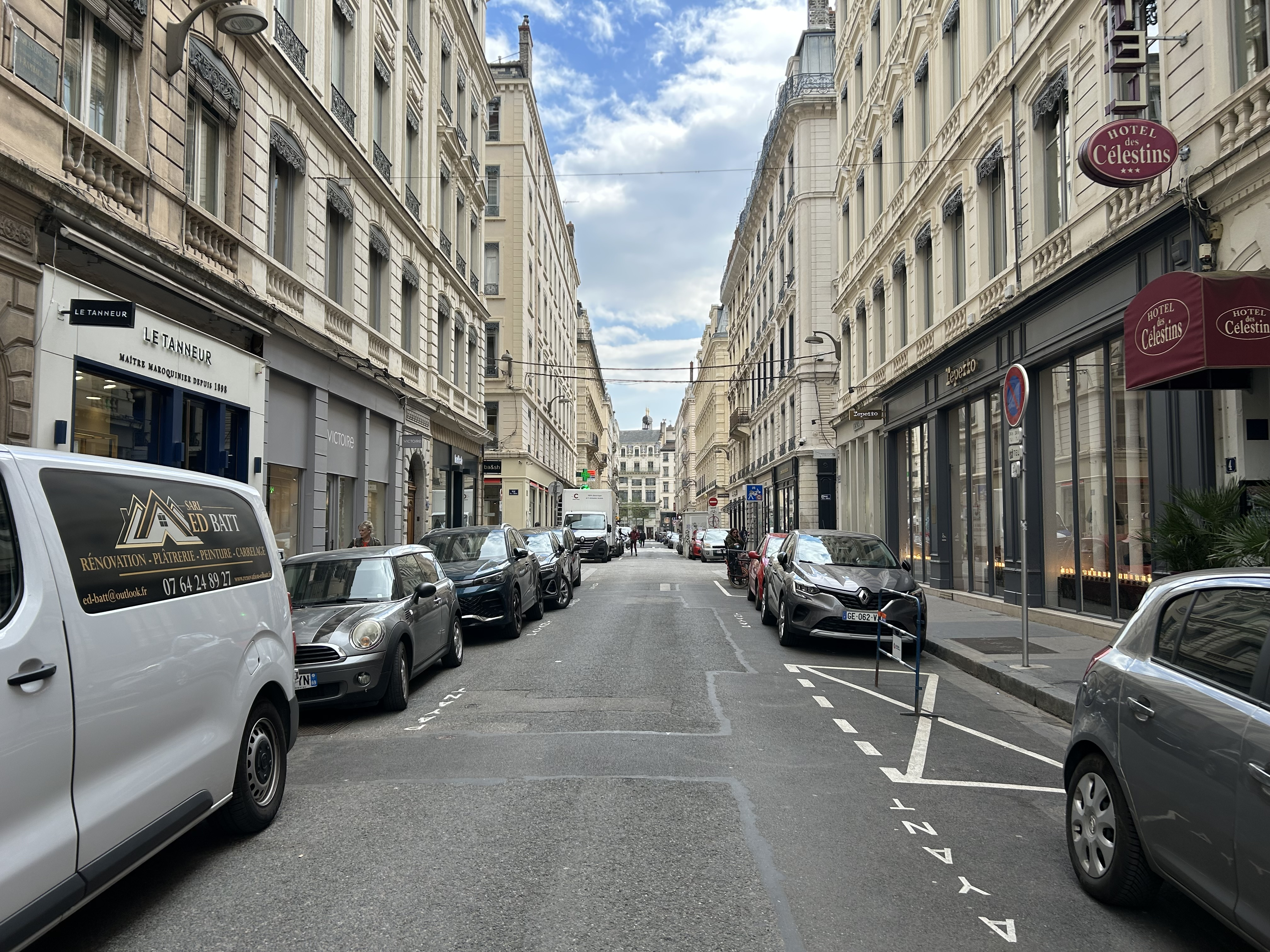
- The street in 2026.
- Interactive map of Rue des Archers
- Type: Street
- Location: 2nd arrondissement of Lyon, Lyon, France
- Postal code: 69002
- Coordinates: 45.759427°N 4.833323°E

The Rue des Archers (French pronunciation: [ʁy dez‿aʁʃe]) is a street located in the 2nd arrondissement of Lyon, in the Cordeliers quarter. It is near the Place Bellecour. The traffic goes from the Rue Édouard-Herriot to the place des Célestins, and is regulated on the part leading to the Rue de la République. The zone is served by the metro station Bellecour of the line A and the bus S1.

== History ==
The street was named after a barracks of royal archers. Indeed, the company of archers had its headquarters in a building in the Cour des Archers. The last vestige of that courtyard is a small vaulted alley located at 10 rue de Confort. The Hôtel des Archers has a modern facade.

The Jacobin monks occupied the location from the 13th century and were dislodged during the French Revolution. The prefecture was established in the street in 1818 and remained here until 1852. The street was created in the mid-19th century and has never been modified since its opening on the Place des Jacobins. In 1827, there were 41 looms. The section between the Rue Émile-Zola and the Place des Célestins was called Passage Couderc as tribute to a deputy of the Rhône, and was abolished in 1873. Five years later, this section was incorporated to the Rue des Archers. In 1923, there were 19 numbers of buildings. The number 3 was built by Henry Feuga, then bequeathed to the Hospices. The numbers 9 and 10 were built under the direction of Casimir Echenier. On 13 August 1829, several five-floor houses were destroyed by a fire and the mayor gave 18,000 francs to the disaster-strickens.

Necker studied the market principles in this street.

At No. 17, the decorative exuberance of the second floor is typical of many office buildings that were built when new streets were created.

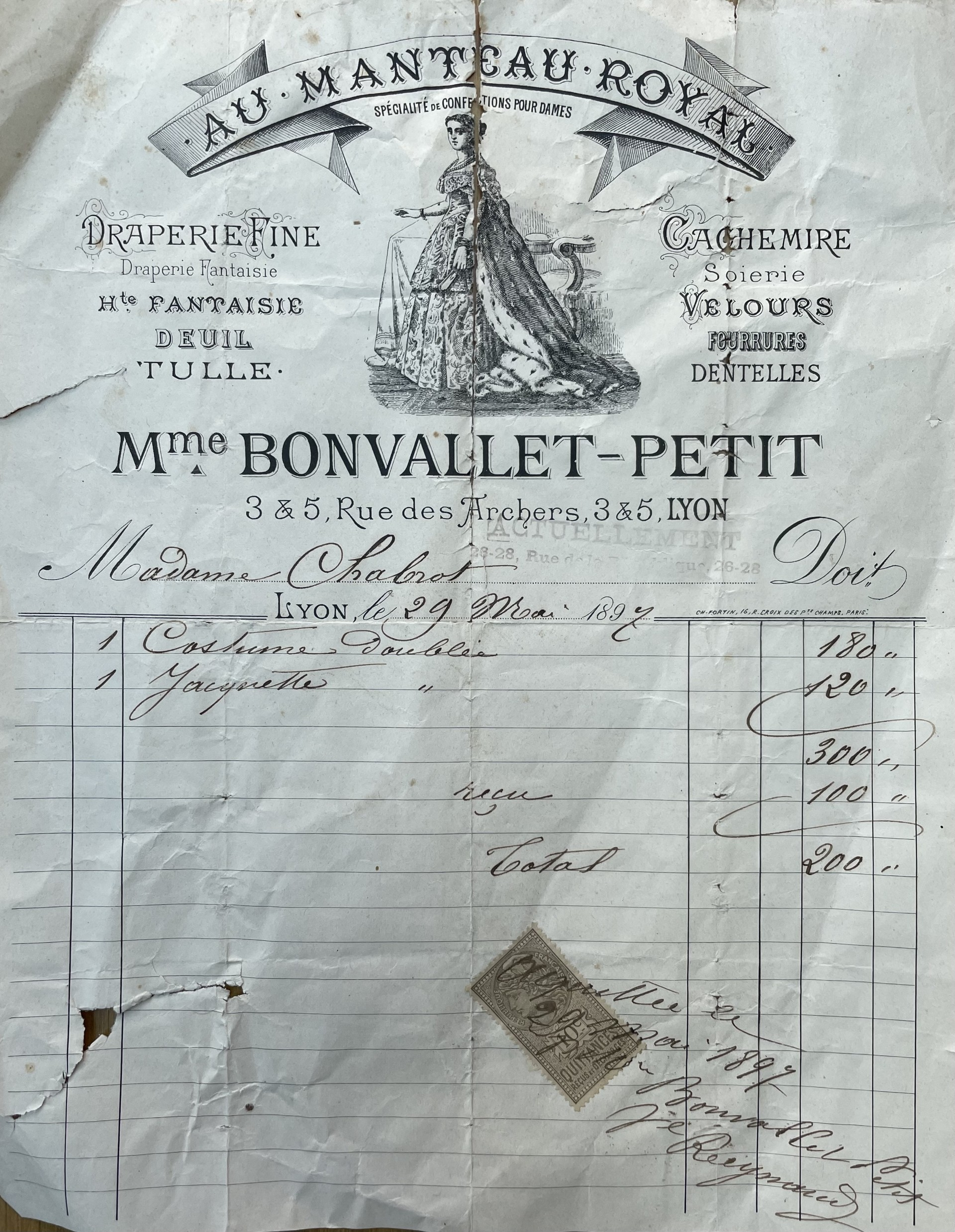
An 1897 invoice from Au Manteau Royal, a boutique in Rue des Archers, Lyon
