= Rue Émile-Zola =

Street in Lyon, France

Coordinates: 45°45′33″N 4°49′58″E

- The street in 2026, snapped from Place Bellecour.
- Interactive map of Rue Émile-Zola
- Former names: Rue Saint-Dominique; Rue Chalier
- Location: 2nd arrondissement of Lyon, Lyon, France
- Postal code: 69002

Construction
- Construction start: 1562

The Rue Émile-Zola is a street located in the 2nd arrondissement of Lyon, near the Place Bellecour. This is one of the busiest shopping streets of Lyon, which was described as a "bourgeois" street because there are many upscale shops. It begins with the Place des Jacobins and ends at the Place Bellecour after crossing the Rue des Archers, and belongs to the zone classified as World Heritage Site by UNESCO. It was named as tribute to the writer of the same name.

== History ==
It was created in 1562 by Protestants under the name of Rue Saint-Dominique, then was called the Rue Chalier in 1793. It received its current name after the deliberation of the municipal council on 14 October 1902 and was then mostly composed of houses of manufacturers of silk, gold or silver textiles. One character in Molière's three-act comedy The Imaginary Invalid, the apothecary Fleurant, was one of the inhabitants of the street. The street had two prestigious hotels welcoming travelers in Lyon in the nineteenth century: the Hôtel du Commerce and the Hôtel des Courriers.

The restaurant "Lucotte", owned by Couderc in 1827, had its ceiling decorated with an oil painting by Sarrabat entitled Sunrise, made circa 1710. In 1835, the Gas Company of Perrache made its first attempts of gas lighting. In 1864, the sign of the cutler Lacouture was a red clothed robot.

The 19th-century Lyon historian and writer Aimé Vingtrinier lived at No. 3, what is recalled by a plate affixed to the door. Among famous inhabitants of the street, there were Jean-Jacques Rousseau, many judges, treasurers, sculptors and architects in the 18th and 19th century. Lyon poet Alexis Rousset was born this street. In the 18th century, the No. 3 was the Lord of the Croix-Rousse's house, Simon-Claude Boulard of Gatelier. The offices of the Canal Company of Givors were at No. 14 in 1843.

== Architecture and description ==
First large, the street became narrow in its second part. It starts with a 20th-century corner tower on the Place des Jacobins. There are balconies of that time and beautiful doorways, in wood or in stone, and some of them can be crossed. Some doors lead to courtyards, as at No. 15. The buildings mostly date from the 18th and 19th-century and have highly decorated entrances.

The street is mainly composed of luxurious shops, including stores of clothes, of shoes, jewelries...
