= Rue de la Poulaillerie =

Thoroughfare in Lyon, France

- Rue Vaudran
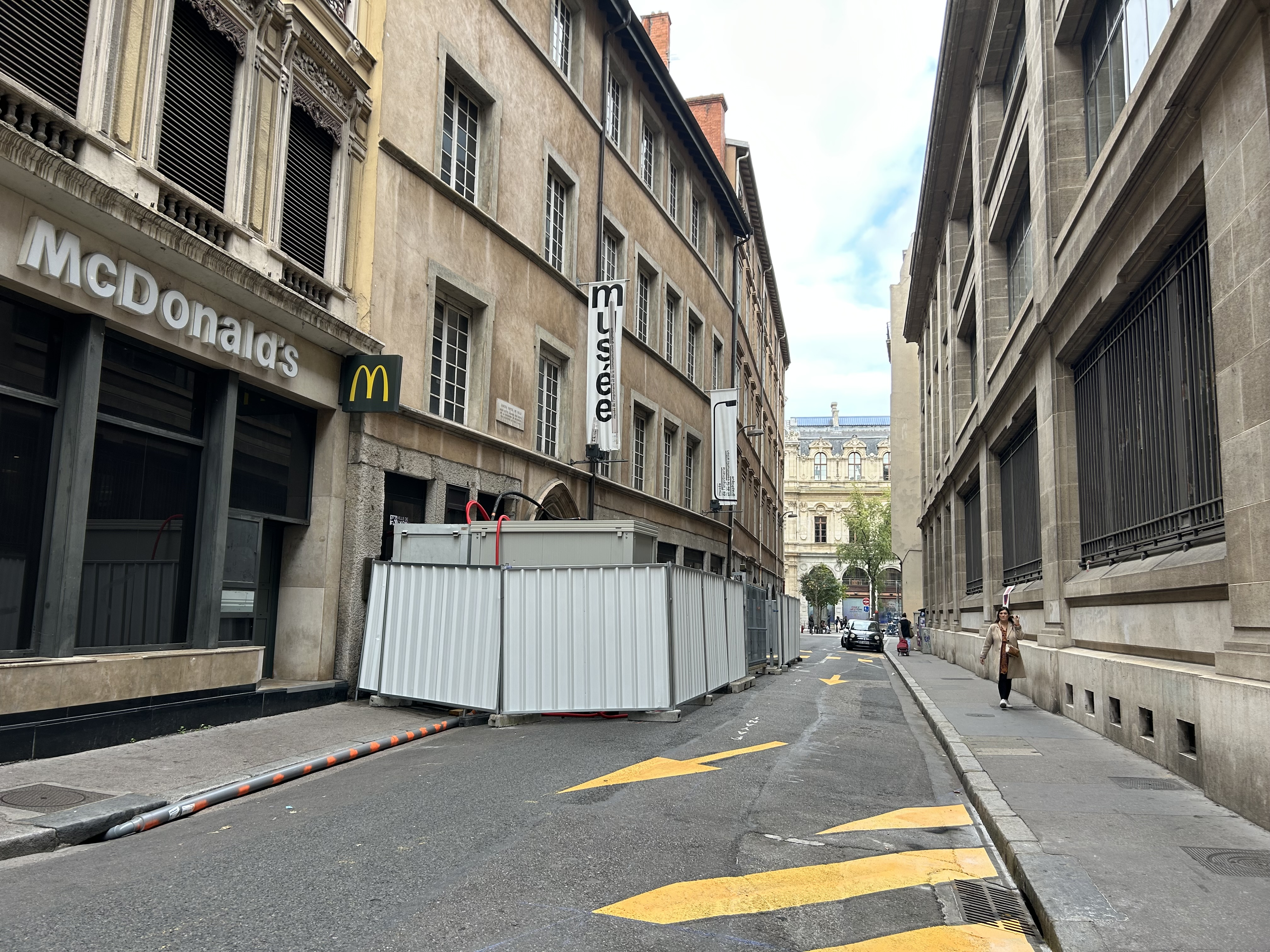
- The street captured in 2025 and from its crossing with rue Édouard-Herriot.
- Interactive map of Rue de la Poulaillerie
- Former name: Rue Maudite
- Type: Street
- Location: 2nd arrondissement of Lyon, Lyon, France
- Postal code: 69002
- Coordinates: 45.764189°N 4.834526°E

The Rue de la Poulaillerie (French pronunciation: [ʁy də la pulajʁi]) is a street located in the 2nd arrondissement of Lyon, France. It was first named Rue Vaudran, and also Rue Maudite in reference to Peter Waldo, who founded what was considered a heresy at the time, the street received its current name from the fact that people exchanged poultry until 1835, when part of this trade emigrated to the covered market of La Martinière.

== History ==
It is a fairly narrow street that links the Rue de Brest to the Rue de la République and was restored by Claude-Marius Vaïsse. In the 12th century, Peter Waldo was draper in the street. In 1529, there was a famous inn called Le Logis de L'Ours. The street was named Rue Maudite on the 1550 plan.

At number 13, the Hôtel de la Couronne was used as Lyon City Hall From 1604 to 1652. At the architectural level, it had vaulted path, stairs and Florentine-styled galleries, and a monument sculpted by Philippe Lalyanne. The building is now replaced by the Musée de l'imprimerie, created by Maurice Audin. The jeweler and watchmaker Adrien Fortune opened a shop in 1852.

Famous historical inhabitants included 15th-century gilder Jean Dirigrunis, painter of the Consulate Pierre Jacquand and printer Jacques Nigon, both of the 19th century.

== Architecture ==
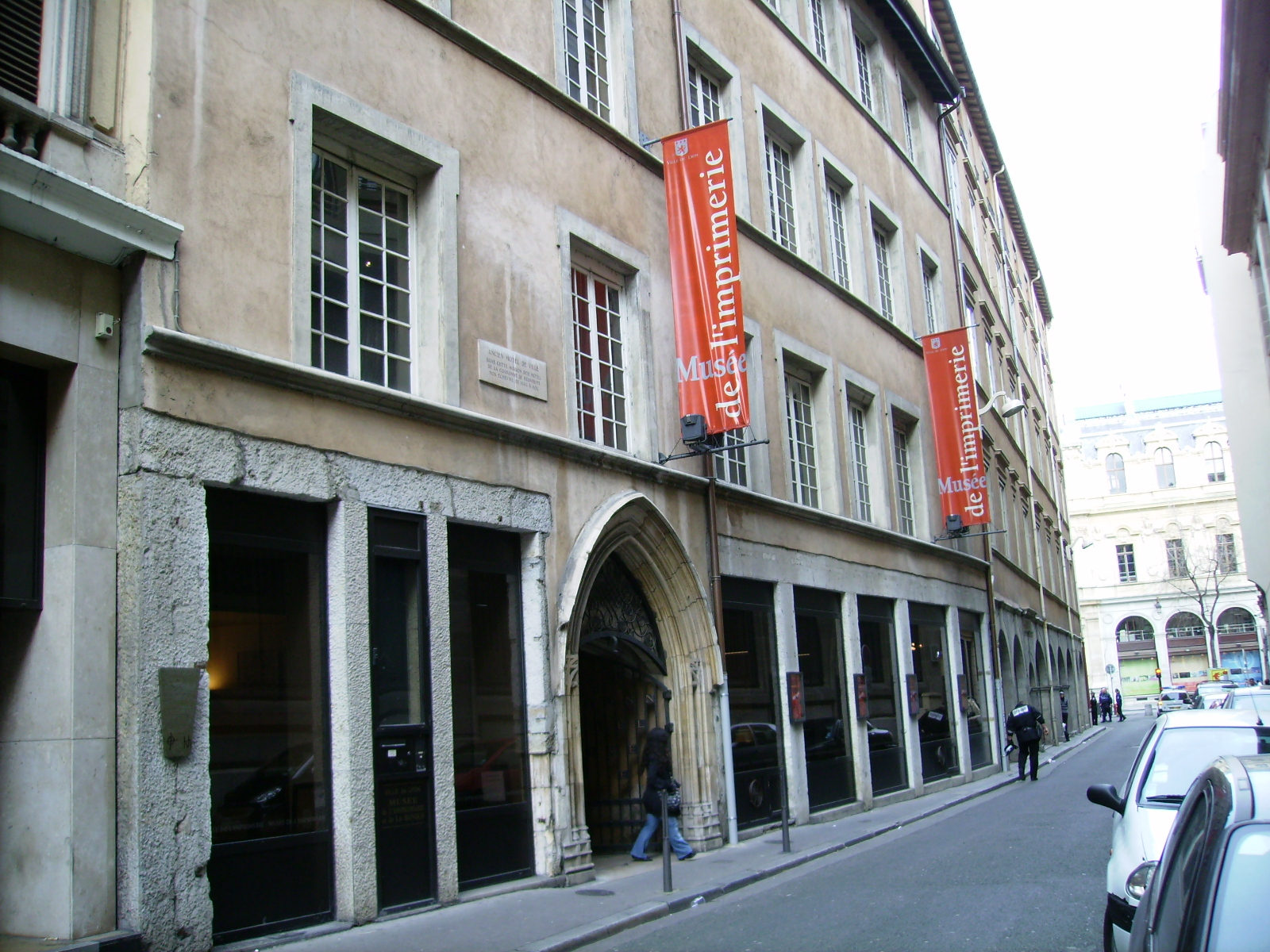
The Musée de l'Imprimerie, at No. 13

At north, the street has first four-floor buildings, the oldest of them were built in the 17th century, then when it meets the Rue de Brest, the buildings are in the style of the 1850s architecture, further they are made of large stones with iron or sculpted flowers.

There is a big, ancient clock made by Charvet which was to be auctioned for over 150,000 euros in 2005, but a decree of 18 March 1864 by the prefect of the Rhone and mayor of Lyon prevented the sale and became the subject of a controversy. There are also statues of angels. The Musée de l'imprimerie in Lyon is located in the north of the street.
