= Rue de Brest =

Street in Lyon, France

- The street seen from its crossing with Tupin Street in 2026.
- Interactive map of Rue de Brest
- Type: Street
- Location: 2nd arrondissement of Lyon, Lyon, France
- Postal code: 69002
- Coordinates: 45.762631°N 4.833309°E

The Rue de Brest (French pronunciation: [ʁy də bʁɛst]) is a street located in the 2nd arrondissement of Lyon. It is one of the main shopping and tourist streets of the city center, parallel to the Rue Édouard-Herriot. It continues the Rue Paul Chenavard and ends with the Place des Jacobins.

== History ==
The street was named thus at the end of the Second World War as a tribute to the city of Brest, which was almost entirely destroyed, as Lyon was involved in financing its reconstruction.

Formerly known as the Rue Centrale until 1943, the Rue de Brest ran until the Rue Tupin and was preceded by the Rue des Trois Carreaux and the Rue Basse Grenette. The northern part has been inhabited since the early Middle Ages, while the southern part from the Rue Tupin is newer and completely remodeled under the direction of René Dardel and Benoît Poncet in 1847. The same year, Roman inscriptions were found. In early 20th century, the sacred grove of India was sold for 40 years by the Vabre et Hysta house. The street received its current name after deliberation of the municipal council on 8 June 1943.

== Architecture and description ==
To the west, the street is composed of 1840s five-floor buildings. The east side consists of a short large section, followed by a series of older facades coming in through the Rue de la Poulaillerie. A three-floor house built in the 16th century named old Grenette can be seen, now also having a terrace with carved stones. The coloured facades of many doors are carved with various designs and have decorations. A large gold porch overlooks the Passage de l'Argue.

At No. 1, there is a straight and traboule with a glass door, a driveway - formerly called Avenue de la Mort - followed by a passage, and two locked gates; it overlooks the Impasse Nizier. At No. 45, the straight traboule is open; it begins with a 19th-century building and leads to the Rue Édouard-Herriot.
