= Rue du Bœuf =

Street in Lyon, France

Coordinates: 45°45′45″N 4°49′37″E

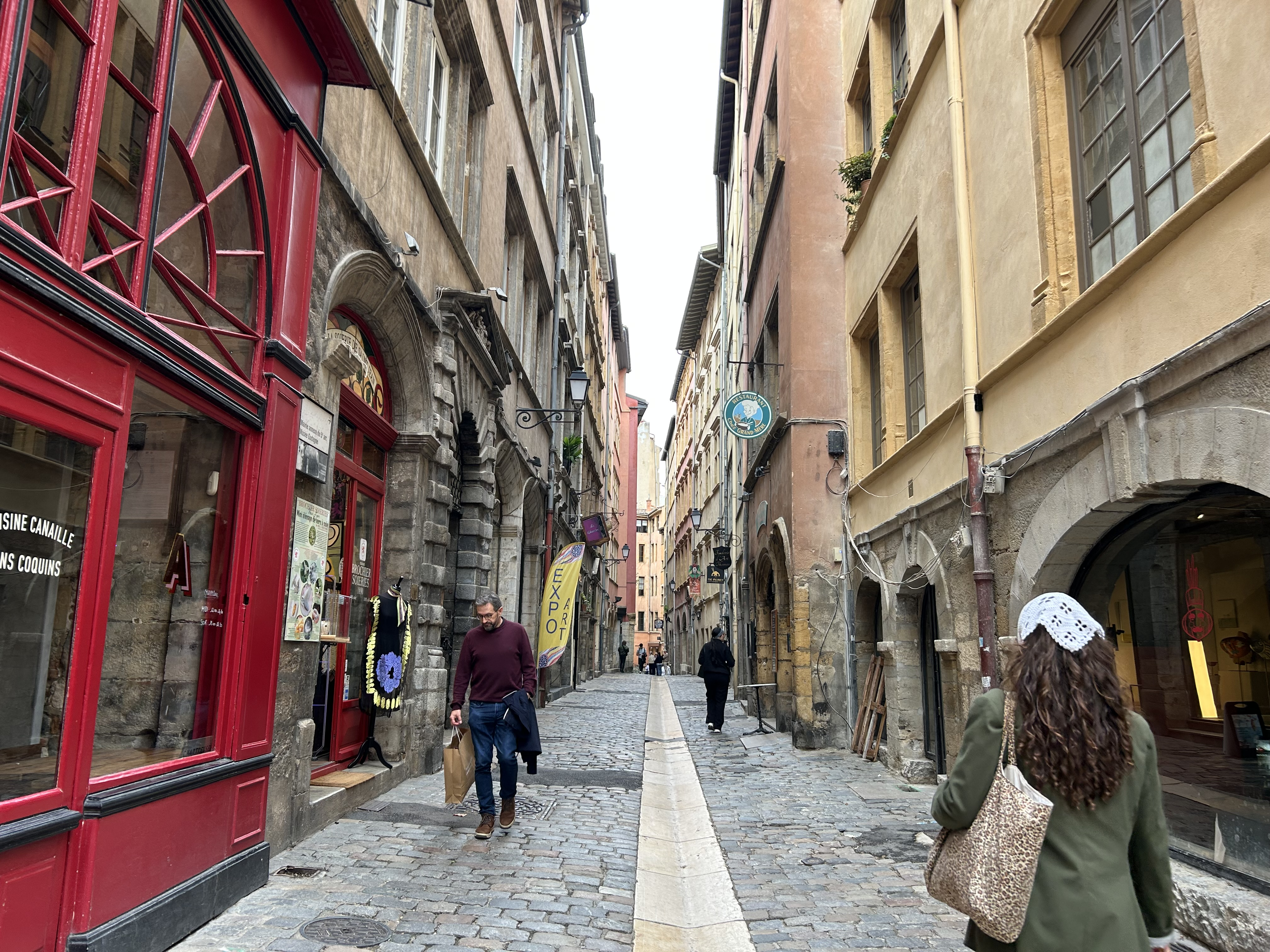
- The street in 2025.
- Former name: Rue Tramassac
- Length: 188 m (617 ft)
- Width: 4.5 meters
- Location: 5th arrondissement of Lyon, Lyon, France
- Postal code: 69005

Construction
- Construction start: 3rd century
- Completion: 16th - 17th centuries

The Rue du Bœuf (French pronunciation: [ʁy dy bœf]) is a 188-metre cobbled pedestrian street of the Vieux Lyon quarter, located in the 5th arrondissement of Lyon. Very representative of the Renaissance architecture of the neighborhood, it is lined only with old houses from the 16th or 17th century. The street connects the Rue de Gadagne which it continues after the Place du Petit Collège and the intersection of the Rue du Chemin Neuf, the Rue de la Bombarde and the Rue Tramassac which prolongs it. The street belongs to the zone classified as World Heritage Site by UNESCO.

== History ==
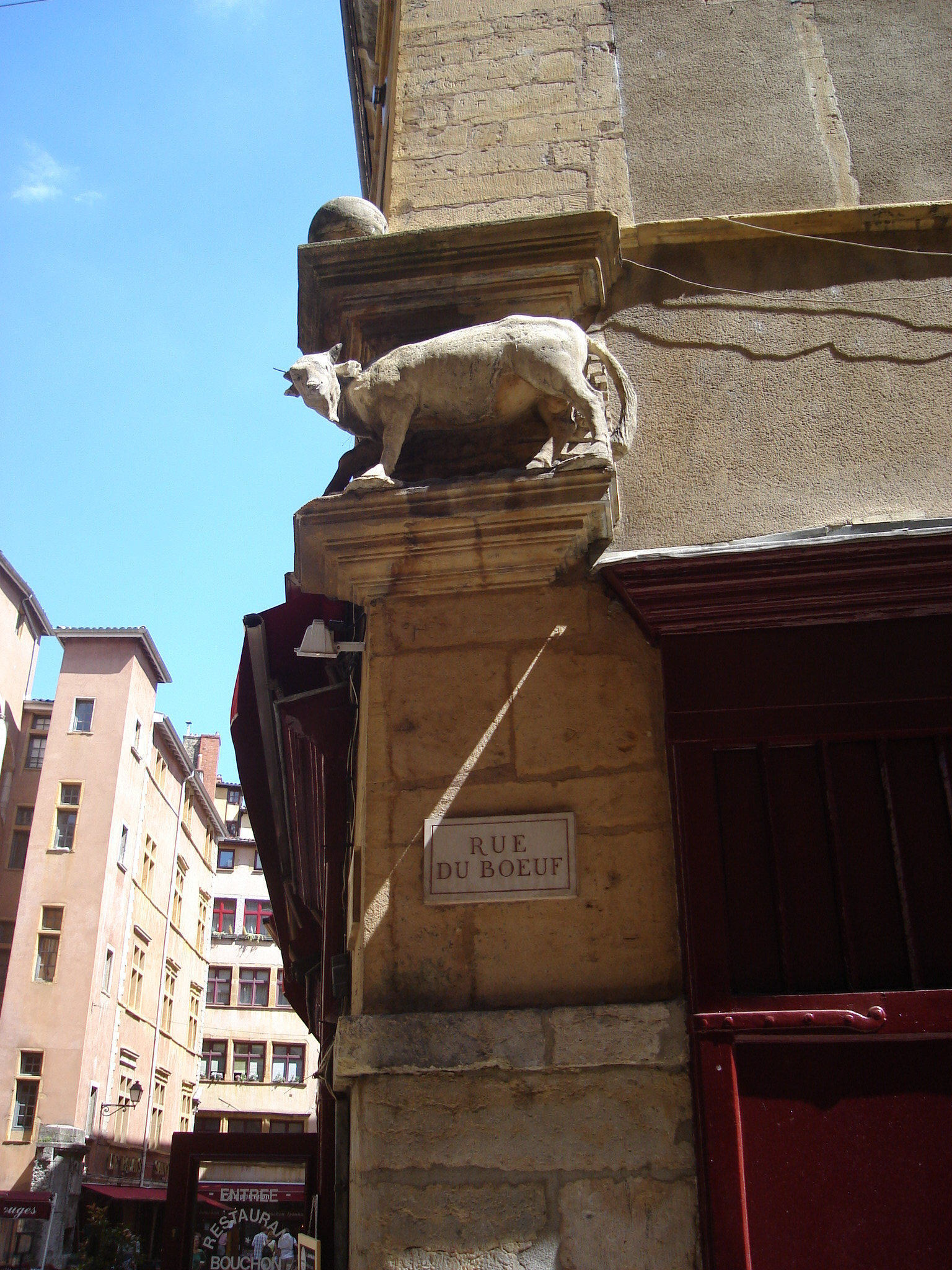
Plaque of the street and statue of beef, at the corner of the rue and the Place Neuve Saint-Jean.

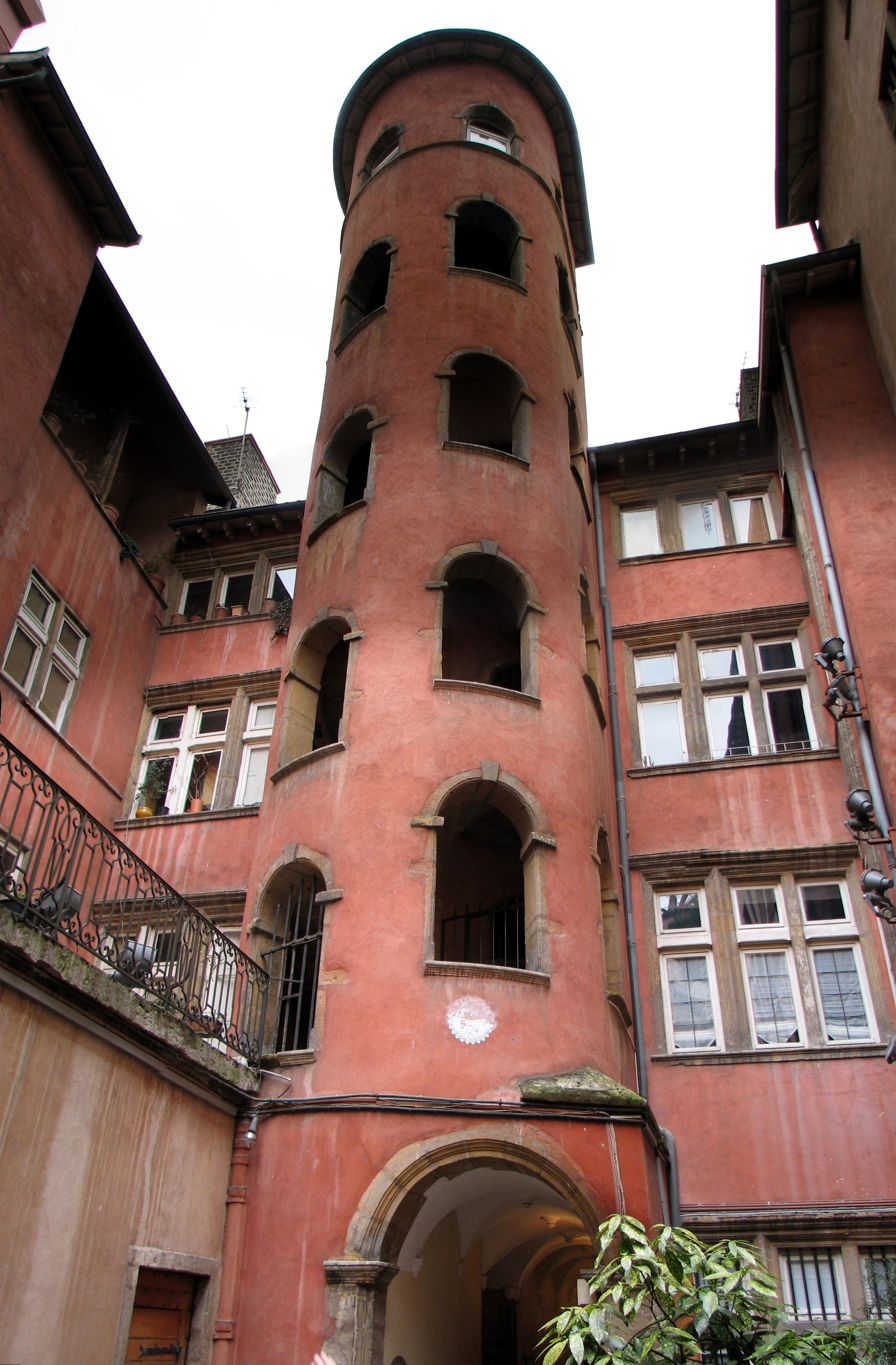
The Tour Rose.

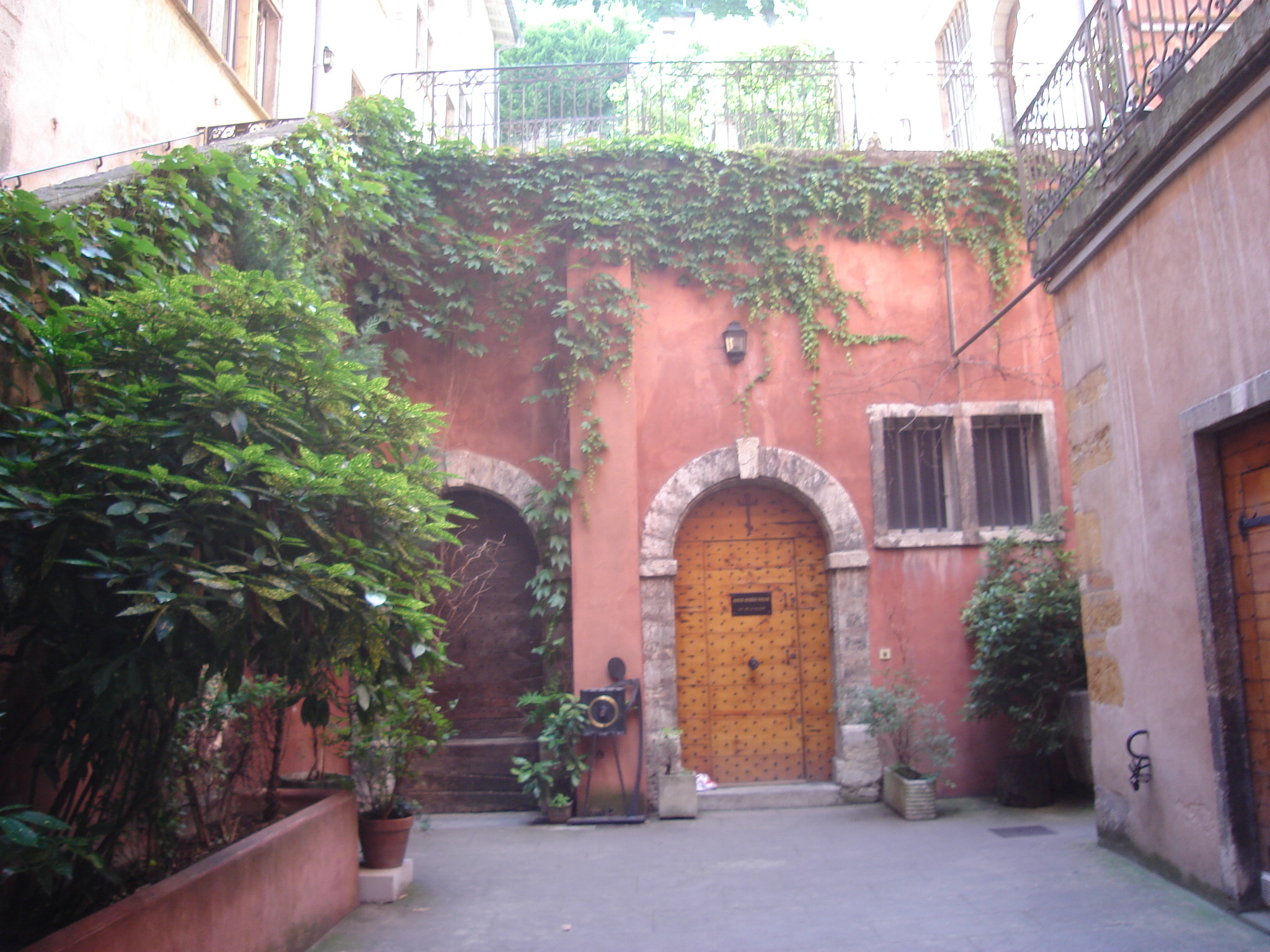
Courtyard of the Tour Rose.

The Rue du Bœuf, like the Rue Saint-Jean, was created to the late 3rd century after the inhabitants of Fourvière, the upper town of Lugdunum, were deprived of water and forced to descend to the Saône to gradually build a whole neighborhood, where is the current Vieux Lyon. The street was once inhabited by wealthy merchants of Lyon, as the Rue Saint-Jean, and was formerly part of the Rue Tramassac which it extends, and had this name before 1586. There was a Mint in the street, which was transferred to the Hôtel du Grollier in 1590. In the 16th century, when a statue of cattle was carved, located in the niche that is at the corner of the Place Neuve Saint Jean, the street received its current name. The statue was first attributed to Jean de Bologne, then to Martin Hendricy, from Liège, who went in Lyon circa 1640. In 1650, the street was extended at north to the Rue Gadagne, providing better traffic in the area, drawing a parallel to the Rue Saint-Jean. In 1722, it was enlarged on the side of the Rue du Chemin Neuf. On 18 February 1822, at 8:45 am, several houses in the street were shattered by an earthquake. In 1825, there were 315 silk looms and 150 workshops in the street. The Nos. 2 and 36 were bequeathed to the hospitals of Lyon, respectively in 1857 and 1884.

Long time ago, on the side of the hill, there were terraces, gardens and stables with an entrance on the montée Saint-Barthélémy.

Famous people who live here include magistrate and writer Laurent Dugas who had his office in the street in 1711. In the early 20th century, or at the late 19th century, the magician Philippe had his office, at the ground floor of the Renaissance building at No. 6, and a sign reminds it in the Cour des Loges.

== Architecture ==
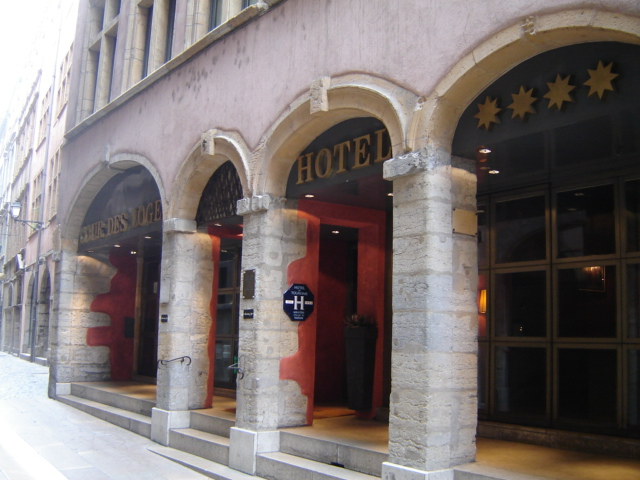
The Cour des Loges, at No. 6.

- No. 3: Facade of the 17th century.
- No. 6: The Cour des Loges, a former Jesuit religious institution, now a large residence of Claude de Beaumont. This architectural complex composed of four Renaissance buildings (16th, 17th and 18th centuries) now houses a five-star hotel and a Michelin-starred restaurant.
- No. 11 (or No. 34): 16th-century house of General Attorney Pierre Builloud, previously owned by Balthazar De Villard, lieutenant of the seneschal of Lyon. Builloud gave a feast in 1589 which gathered religious personnamities and which remained famous under the name Festin des sept sages or Festin d'Agathon.
- No. 13: Taurus sculpted by Martin Hendricy circa 1640 as emblem of the Torelli, an Italian family.
- No. 14: House of the Croppet, a family of magistrates. In 1562, Jean Croppet hid in the well of the house part of the treasure of the Cathedral of St. John to prevent it from being looted by the Baron of Adrets during the wars of religion. To perpetuate the memory, the counts of Lyon did raise an obelisk of polished stone. In the 19th century, the hotel was beautifully decorated with paintings by Blanchet, and the ceiling of the dining room contained an inscription: "Neither regret of the past nor fear of the future." Currently, the vault of access to the courtyard is composed of two semicircular arches with a central pendant. The semi-octagonal tower is supported by a back wall and three pillars.
- No. 16 : Famous Tour rose, composed of an internal courtyard and a pinkish plaster tower, and built after plans by architect Sertio. This 16th-century building was originally the Maison du Crible. The 17th century portal is highly decorated, with bosses and ringed columns, and surmounted by a pediment decorated with a bas-relief which depicts the Nativity/Adoration of the Magi, attributed to Bologna.
- No. 19 : House of L'outarde d'or, originally a sign of a poulterer, built in 1487 with a sign made in 1708.
- Montée des Chazeaux : it crosses the Rue du Bœuf near the Rue de la Bombarde, formerly called "Tire-Cul" because of its 230 steps. It was named after a Benedictine monastery whose primary home was in Chazeaux in the department of the Loire.
- No. 22 : Hotel named after a traboule of the Tour rose at No. 16. Two medallions adorn the ground floor with the effigy of a couple, probably the owners. In the courtyard, the round tower has a spiral staircase, in front of a terrace and a garden. In the background, there is a pit shell near the studded door of the Institut des sciences clavologiques. The hotel, composed of three 15th and 18th-century buildings, has 12 rooms. It housed Molière for three years.

The street has many traboules, but are not open to the public. The most notable and longest of Vieux Lyon is at No. 27 and crosses four houses to reach the Rue Saint-Jean, at No. 54.

== See also ==
- Traboule
