= Place Ampère =

Pedestrian square in the Ainay square, Lyon, France

Coordinates: 45°45′11″N 4°49′44″E

The Place Ampère is a pedestrian square located in the Ainay square, in the 2nd arrondissement of Lyon. It is nearly the middle of the Rue Victor-Hugo and is served by the metro station Ampère - Victor Hugo.

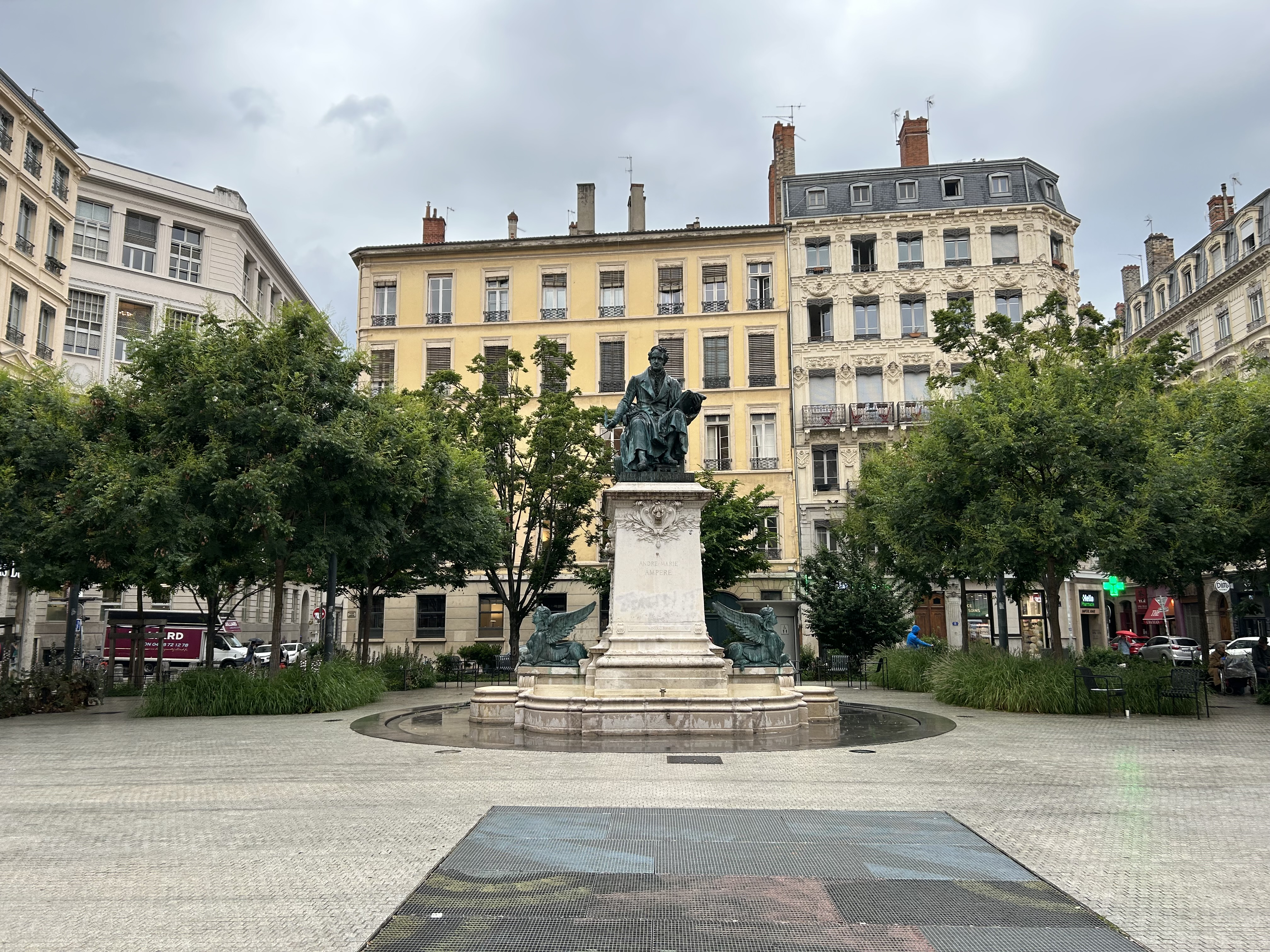
Statue of André-Marie Ampère in 2025.

== History ==
The square was already populated in the Roman era.

Designed during the first half of the 19th century with the development of the Rue Victor Hugo, it was redeveloped in 1976, when the metro was created.

The square was named Place Henri IV from 1828 to 1848 and from 1849 to 1884. In 1848-1849, it was renamed Place de l'Espérance. The current name was given by a deliberation, on 27 November 1884.

== Architecture ==
A statue made by Charles Textor portraying André-Marie Ampère was erected in the center of the square, on his bronze armchair, and a stone pedestal engraved with lions and a few of his many titles of glory. It was inaugurated by President of France Sadi Carnot on 8 September 1888.

The square is lined with buildings of the 19th century and a post office. It is illuminated on the night with violet colours. The vegetation consists mainly of Hornbeams and Paulownias, with suspensions of spring flowering bulbs.

The blocked up traboule at No. 6 crosses two buildings and starts by a nineteenth-century building with pediments above the windows of the first and second floors.

== See also ==
- List of streets and squares in Lyon
