= Montée des Carmélites =

Street in Lyon, France

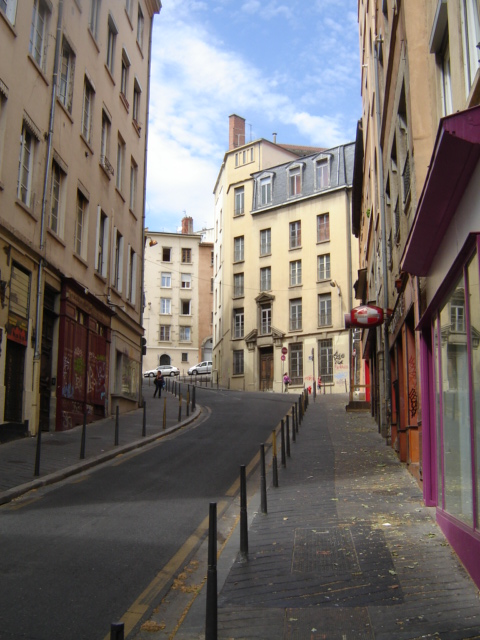
- Interactive map of Montée des Carmélites
- Former names: Voie du Rhin; Montée de la Déserte; Côte Saint-Vincent
- Location: 1st arrondissement of Lyon, Lyon, France
- Postal code: 69001
- Coordinates: 45.7712°N 4.8283°E

Construction
- Construction start: Roman times

The Montée des Carmélites (French pronunciation: [mɔ̃te de kaʁmelit]) is one of the oldest streets of Lyon, dating from Roman times, located in the 1st arrondissement of Lyon. It connects the Saint-Vincent quarter to the Plateau de la Croix-Rousse. It is situated between the Rue de la Tourette and the Rue Ray Fernand, and ends at the intersection of the Rue Burdeau, Rue du Jardin des Plantes and Rue de l'Annonciade.

== History ==
This route, originally named Voie du Rhin, was then called Montée de la Déserte in reference to a convent founded in 1296 by Blanche de Châlon at the location of the current Place Sathonay. It was also known as Côte Saint-Vincent. At least from 1651, the street took its current name, referring to the Carmelites who were established in the neighborhood in 1616 by Jacqueline de Harlay, wife of Governor Charles de Neuville d'Alincourt. The convent of the Sisters of St. Charles replaced a monastery established here in 1624. On 22 November 1831, a battalion of the army was disarmed by the canuts in this street.

At No. 9, some pieces of the Roman road leading to the Rhine were found in 1857. In 1668, the Carmelite Church was built and the facade was made in 1682 by Fr.Dorbay plans and became a theater after French Revolution. In the 19th century, many cartoonists, including Louis Zolla and Ludovic Cassini, lived in the street.

In the early twentieth century, there were many religious orders installed in the street: on the down, the Desert Abbey, the Great Carms, the Great Augustins and the Monastery of St. Benedict, higher the Heavenly Annunciation and the Carmelites, and finally the Carthusians at the top.

From September 2004 to September 2006, a building was restructured.

== Description ==
The lower part of the street was transformed into a staircase to reduce its dangerousness, as it is very steep. In the early Second Empire, an access for vehicles was made as a winding path in the Jardin des Plantes, near the amphitheater. The street is almost straight on its whole length. Downstairs, the street ends with two six-floor buildings built in the canut style of the 19th century. The upper part is composed of old houses with three to five floors. There is a statue of Virgin Mary at No.26.

An article of December 2003 of French newspaper Libération paying tribute to the artist Henri Berthet is displayed in one of the windows of the street. There are five restaurants. At No. 20, the corner traboule is now closed and starts with a canut house with a 17th-century door taken from a chapel and a knocker shaped like an inverted 5.
