= Traboule =

Covered passageway traversing multiple buildings

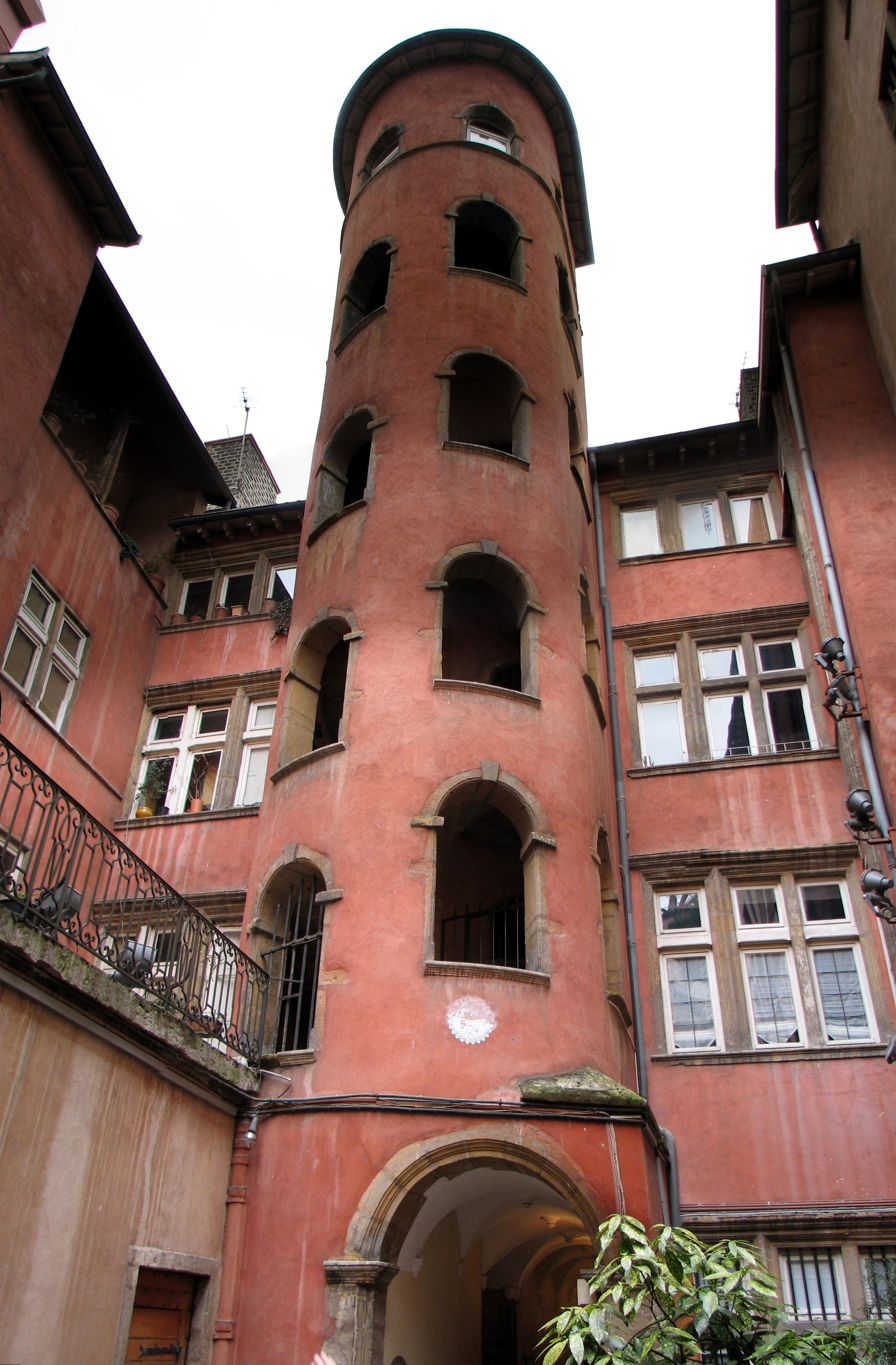
Courtyard of a traboule (Vieux Lyon)

Traboules (French pronunciation: [tʁabul]; from Latin transambulare via vulgar Latin trabulare meaning "to cross") are a type of hidden covered passageways primarily associated with the city of Lyon, France, but also located in the French cities of Villefranche-sur-Saône, Mâcon, and Saint-Étienne, along with a few in Chambéry. In Lyon, they were originally used by silk manufacturers and other merchants to transport their products.

== Lyon ==
The first examples of traboules are thought to have been built in Lyon in the fourth century. Lacking water, the inhabitants moved to the banks of the Saône (in the 'lower town', at the foot of the Fourvière hill). The traboules thus allowed them to get from their homes to the river quickly and allowed the canuts on the La Croix-Rousse hill to get quickly from their workshops to the textile merchants at the foot of the hill. Thus the traboules of Lyon are located primarily in the 'old city' (5th arrondissement) and the Croix Rousse (1st and 4th arrondissements).

The "Traboule de la cour des Voraces" ("Traboule of the Voracious Court") is the most famous, located in the Croix-Rousse quarter. It is one of the landmarks of the Canut Revolts (canut is a local term for silk workers) and it is also the oldest reinforced concrete stairwell in Lyon.

The layout of Vieux Lyon is such that there are very few connecting streets running perpendicular to the river. The traboules allowed workmen and craftsmen to transport clothes and other textiles through the city while remaining sheltered from inclement weather. For many inhabitants, being a "true Lyonnais" requires being knowledgeable about the city's traboules. Nowadays, traboules are tourist attractions, and several are free and open to the public. Most traboules are on private property, serving as entrances to local apartments.

Many, if not most, of the underground passages have been blocked off and are currently used as storage areas. Other former traboules remain accessible to the public but can now only be reached through one of the two original entrances, due to the other entrance now being closed. These are sometimes referred to as miraboules (from mirer, "to stare"), as sightseers may still admire the internal courtyard spaces, despite no longer being able to use them as thoroughfares.

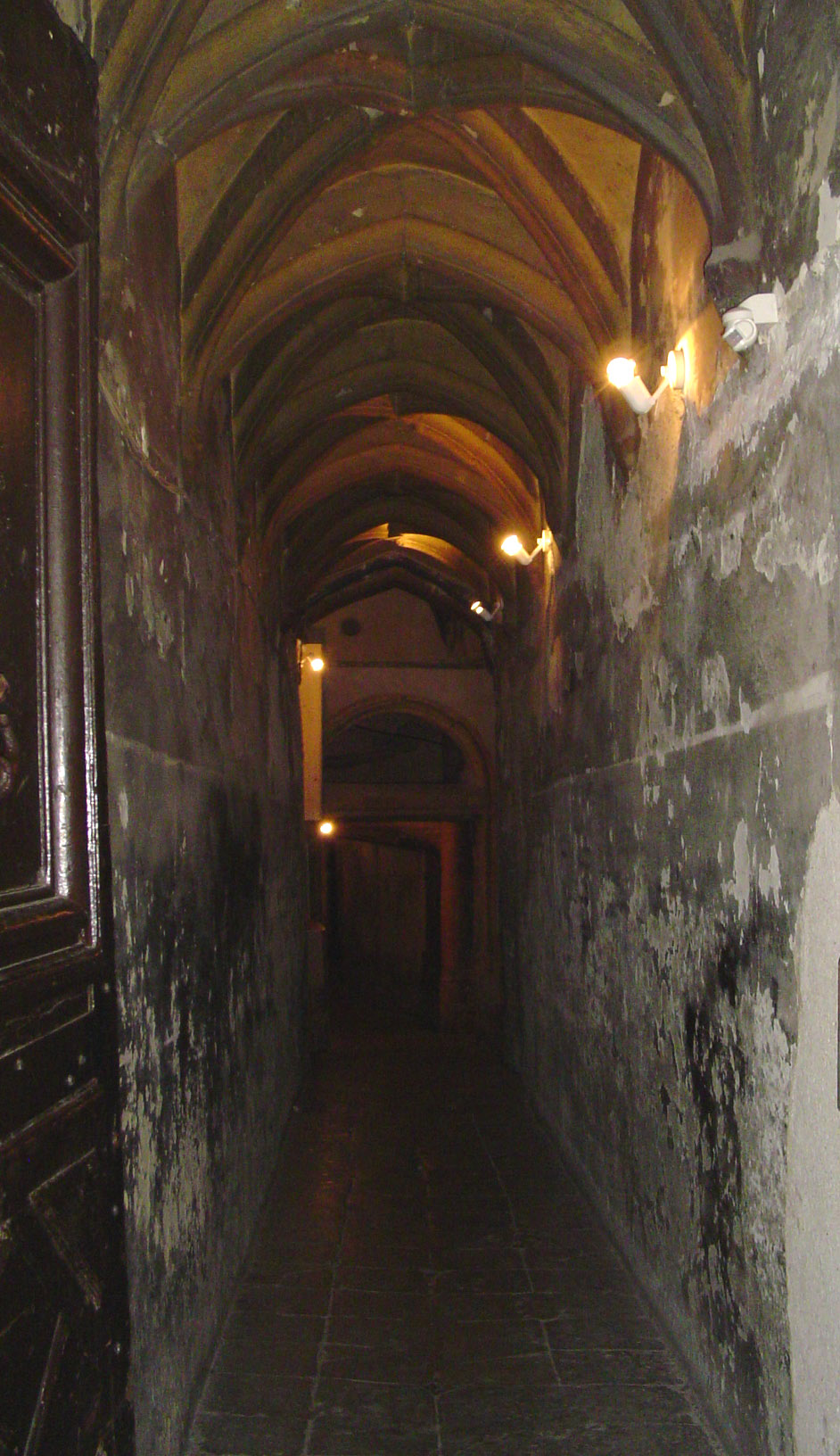
Traboule (Vieux Lyon)

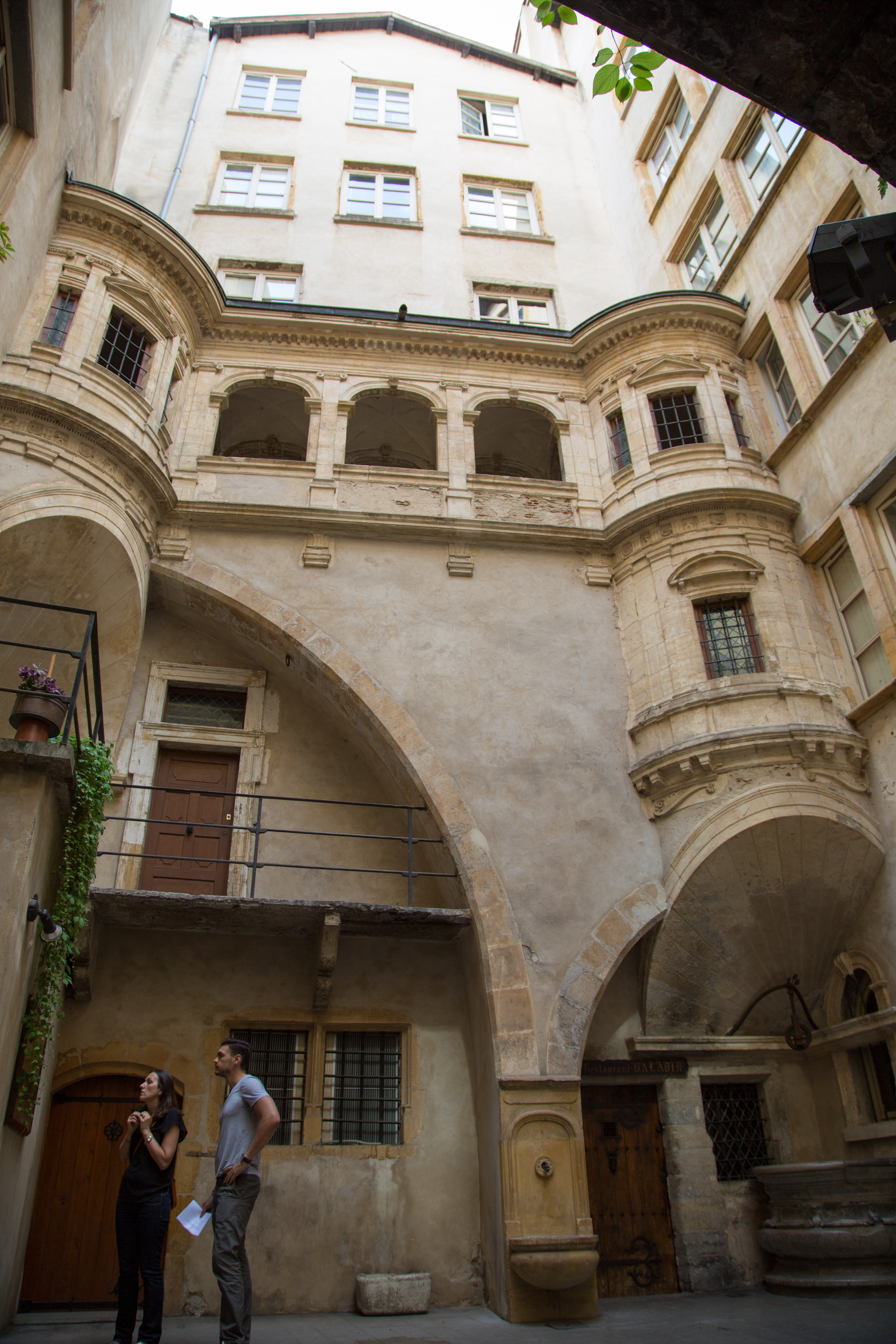
Traboule in Lyon

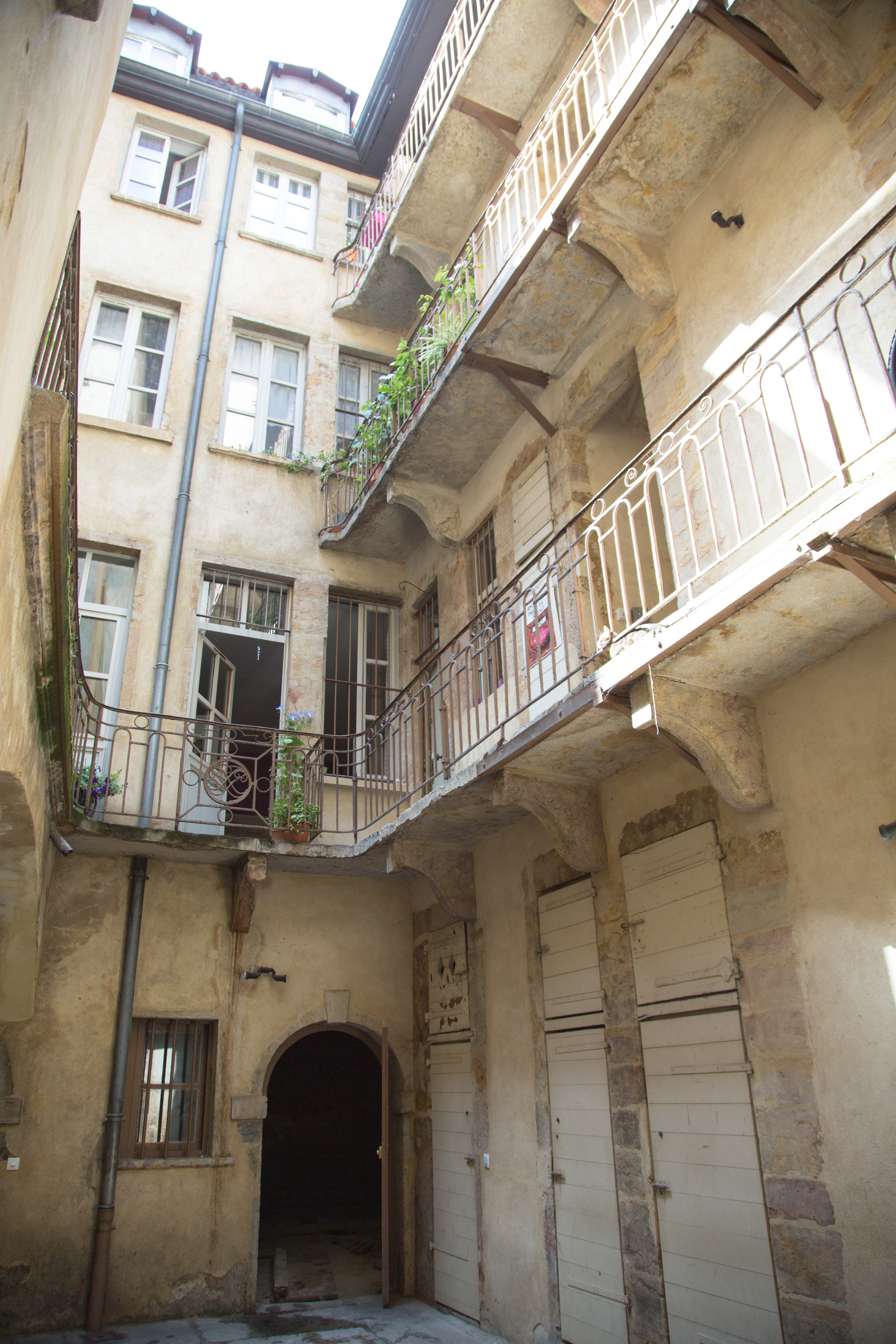
Traboule in Lyon

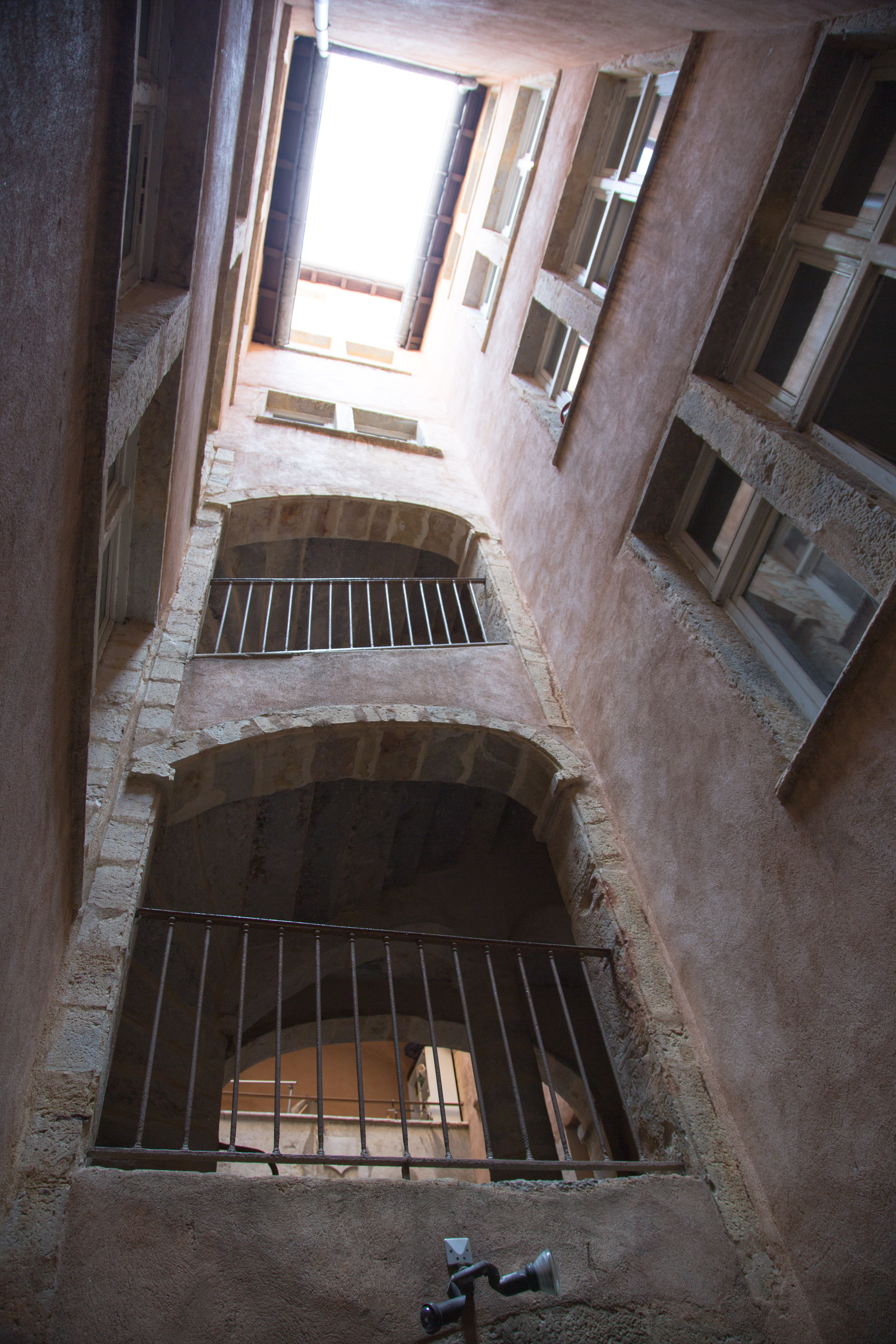
Traboule in Lyon

== See also ==
- History of Lyon
- Vieux Lyon
