= Rue Édouard-Herriot =

Street in Lyon, France

- The street in 2026, snapped from Le Viste Square.
- Interactive map of Rue Édouard-Herriot
- Former name: Rue de l'Hôtel de Ville
- Location: 2nd arrondissement of Lyon, Lyon, France
- Postal code: 69002
- Coordinates: 45.76336°N 4.834196°E

Construction
- Construction start: 19th century

The Rue Édouard-Herriot (or Rue du Président-Édouard-Herriot [ʁy dy pʁezidɑ̃ edwaʁ ɛʁjo]) is one of the most important shopping streets of the Presqu'île in Lyon. It links the two most famous places of the city, the Place Bellecour (south) and the Place des Terreaux (north). Its northern part is located in the 1st arrondissement of Lyon, but the main part of the street is in the 2nd arrondissement. In its southern part, the street passes through the Place des Jacobins. It belongs to the zone classified as World Heritage Site by UNESCO.

== History ==
In the mid-nineteenth century, Claude-Marius Vaïsse, then prefect of the Rhône and also assuming the duties of mayor, decided to restructure the Presqu'île in the manner of Georges-Eugène Haussmann in Paris. In the first plan drawn in 1853, a new street connected the current Place de la République to the Place des Terreaux. Finally, the new axis, which was named Rue de l'Impératrice, was built in the 1860s in a straight line between the Place Bellecour and the Place des Terreaux. The avenue began from the Place Le Viste, widened at the same time, and crossed the Place des Jacobins, which then took its final form. The street widened and formed two new small squares which were named in 1930 (Place Francisque Regaud in 1931 and Place Antoine-Isaac Rivoire in 1934). The new street included part of the existing streets :

- Rue de la Plume, which is now the eastern part of the Place Franciscque Regaud,
- Rue de l'Aumône,
- Rue de Vandran,
- Place de la Fromagerie before the apse of the Église Saint-Nizier at the place of the current Place Antoine-Isaac Rivoire,
- Rue de la Sirène,
- Rue de Clermont, opened on the lands belonging to the Abbey Saint-Pierre in 1582.

After the fall of Napoleon III in 1870, the street was renamed Rue de l'Hôtel de Ville. A few months after Mayor Édouard Herriot's death in 1957, the street was renamed after him, after deliberation of the municipal council on 17 June of the same year.

== Architecture and description ==
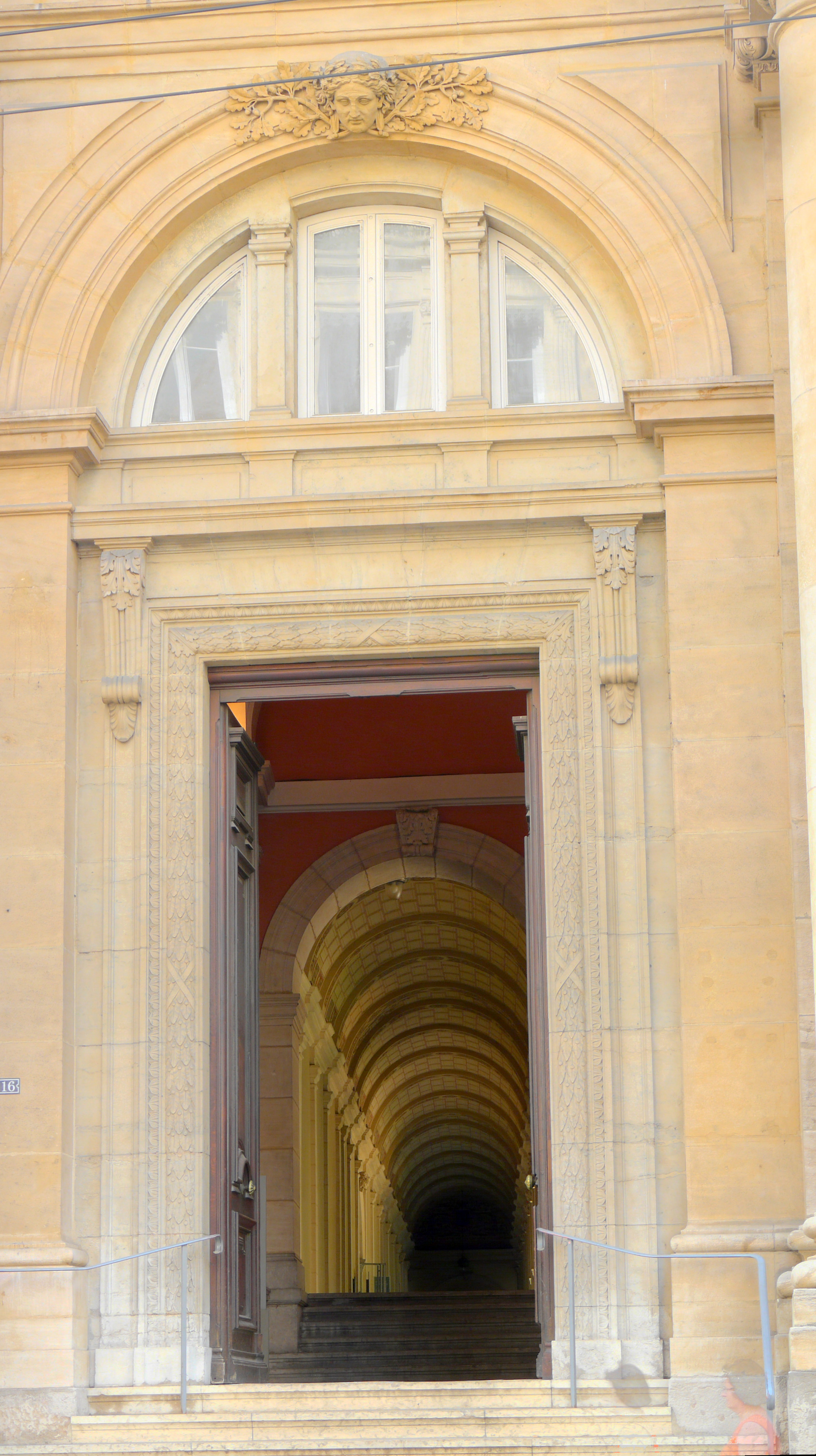
Entrance of the Musée des Beaux-Arts de Lyon which overlook on the Rue Édouard-Herriot

Most buildings along this street were built in the second part of the nineteenth century and have numerous ornaments (devils, virgins, kings, angels, etc.). There are also two older buildings that slightly break the perfect alignment of the street, the numbers 21 and 23 : they correspond to the eastern part of the ancient Rue de la Sirène. Further in the north, the facade of the Abbey of Saint-Pierre (now Musée des Beaux-Arts de Lyon), with a grand entrance between two columns, which was formerly on the Rue de Clermont, dating from the seventeenth century.

The street is known for its numerous luxury shops like Louis Vuitton, Cartier, Christian Dior, Longchamp, and Hermes. With the Rue de la République to the east, the Rue de Brest to the west and Rue Victor-Hugo to the south, it is the commercial center of the city.

There are also a Virgin Megastores, a worship place of Friends of Man and the office of the international festivals of Lyon. At number 78, two medallions of Gutenberg and Senefelder. At number 72, a plaque referring prince of the singers Xavier Privas. At number 38, there are two caryatids representing trade and industry, made by Fabisch in 1865. There are also two Madonna and Child at Nos. 19 and 40, respectively at the corner of the Rue Mulet and the Rue Longue.

The street has a great architectural diversity and an accumulation of historical references. At number 36, the facade is typical of the Claude-Marius Vaïsse art, combining lush decoration, bays and mashrabiyas. At number 81, the building looks like a baroque palace.
