= Place des Jacobins =

Square in Lyon, France

Coordinates: 45°45′38″N 4°50′01″E

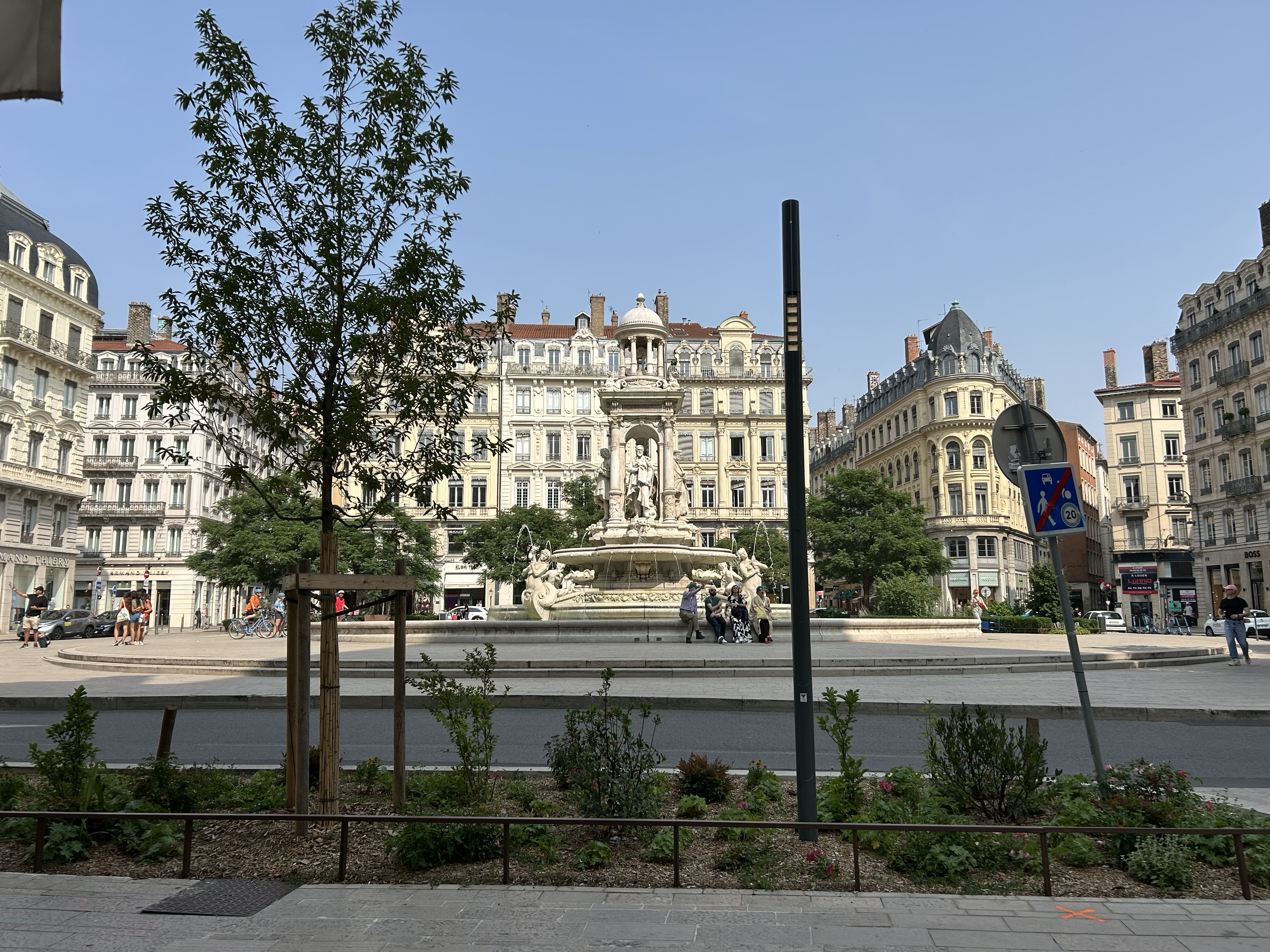
Place des Jacobins, Lyon, in 2025.

The Place des Jacobins (French pronunciation: [plas de ʒakɔbɛ̃]) is a square located in the 2nd arrondissement of Lyon. It was created in 1556 and a fountain was added in 1856. The square belongs to the zone classified as World Heritage Site by UNESCO. According to Jean Pelletier, this square is one of the most famous in Lyon, because of its location in the center of the 2nd arrondissement and its heavy traffic, as 12 streets lead here. The square, particularly its architecture and its features, has changed its appearance many times throughout years.

The Fontaine des Jacobins located in Place de Jacobins, Lyon, France - black & white (2024).

== Successive names ==
In 1740, the square was called Place Confort which then absorbed the Rue des Alards in 1556, named after a rich family who owned buildings in the neighborhood. In 1782, it became the Place des Jacobins, then, in 1794, was renamed Place de la Fraternité. After changing its name twice — Place de la Préfecture in 1858, then Place de l'Impératrice in 1868 —, it was renamed Place des Jacobins in February 1871. The current name of the square comes from the Jacobins, also named religious Preachers of the Order of St. Dominic, who occupied the building on the southern side of the square from 1296. These Dominicans were called Jacobins when Philippe Auguste gave them a building in Paris and the brothers went on pilgrimage to Santiago de Compostela (Jacobus in Latin).

== History ==
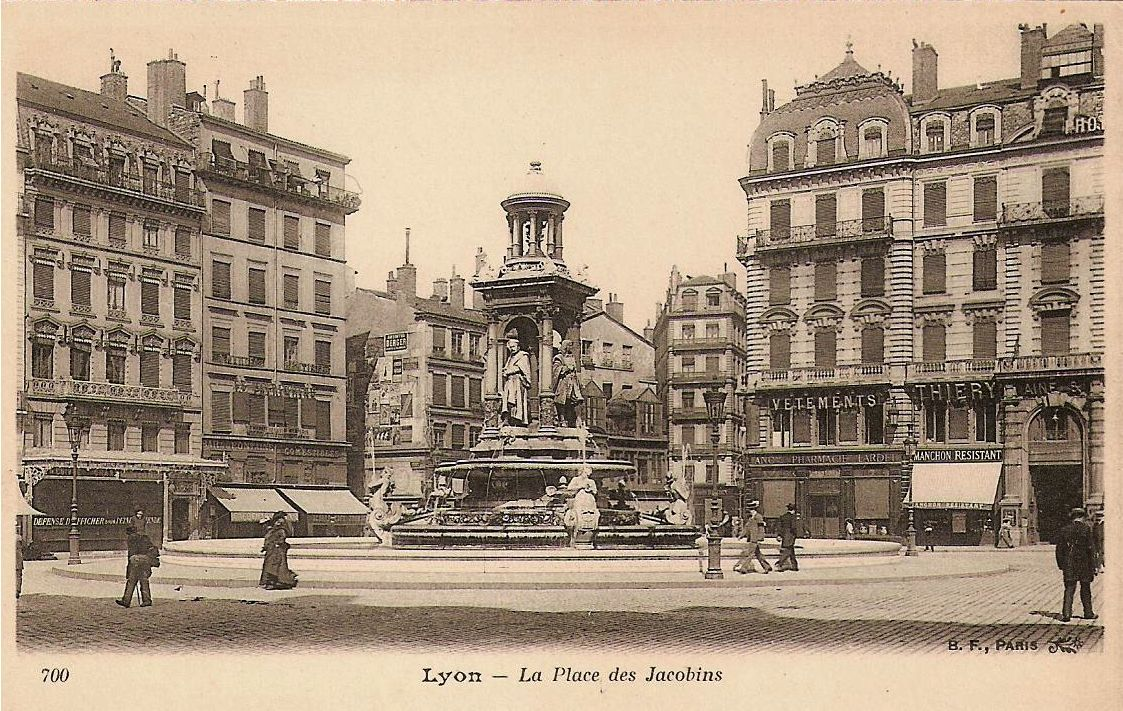
The Place des Jacobins, c. 1900. In the background, the first buildings of the Rue Mercière, demolished when the southern part was redeveloped.

=== Square and buildings ===
The square was created in 1556 after a request by King Henri II who wanted to replace the monks cemetery, located at the north of the Jacobins church, with a market. One year later, the walls of the old cemetery of monks disappeared and the place became a public square. In 1562, some buildings were destroyed by the troops of the Baron des Adrets to open the Rue Saint-Dominique. The square was then triangular and named Place de Confort.

From 1296, the Jacobins had a convent on the place, with a garden, and Jacques Duèze was elected Pope in this convent on 7 August 1316 by 23 cardinals locked in by the Count of Poitiers. Here Humbert II, the last Dauphin of Vienne (1348), made an assignment of his States to Charles, eldest son of the Duke of Normandy. In 1495, Charles VIII and his wife lived in the monastery. After the Revolution of 1789, the monastery was used as cars shed. Attempts to reestablish the cult and to create a parish named St. Pothin were unsuccessful.

The Jacobins church was built over a period from 1657 to 1689 and, in the same time, a big portal added by architect Antoine Lepautre allowed the building to reach great notoriety, and famous people attended the offices, including Louis XII in 1501. The convent was rebuilt in 1714 and eventually nationalized in 1793. A land contiguous to the chapel was sold in 1725 and bought by Vingtrinier in 1779, then by the State in 1822. The church was demolished in 1818 and the convent housed the prefecture of the Rhone from 1812 to 1852 under the leadership of prefect of Rhône Pierre de Bondy (and thus the street was renamed Place de la Préfecture at the time).

Notable events that occurred on the square include executions of political opponents on 15 March 1590, a big firework to celebrate the peace in 1713, and shows by a temporary theater built by Falconnet and Farge in 1834, quickly destroyed by a fire.

The square was enlarged twice: first in 1824, during the creation of the Rue Centrale, built by the architects Benoît Poncet and Jean-Amédée Savoye; then in 1860, when the square became trapezoidal as the Rue Gasparin was opened and new buildings were added. Some mosaics found on the square provided indications of what Roman houses looked like.

In 2004, a plaque recounting its history was added to the square.

=== Cross and well ===
Originally, there was a cross on the square, but it was removed in 1562 by the Protestants. Subsequently, a formal approval in 1599 allowed to rebuild a cross, and between 1603 and 1609, Philippe Lalyame erected a pyramidal obelisk surmounted by a cross representing the Trinity and with the God's name in at least 24 languages. During the 1662 civil war, the Protestants considered this monument as a symbol of religious freedom and did not destroy it. After an urgent request by all residents of the quarter, based on the fact that this monument "[was] one of the oldest in th[e] city", this antiquated pyramid was rebuilt in 1739 by the consulate that also did add an inscription celebrating Louis XV. During the French Revolution, the pyramid was destroyed on 9 March 1793; only the pedestal of the fountain remained until 1813.

Horace Cardon, who lived here, rebuilt the well in 1614 at his own expense. About one century later, the well was no longer sufficient for all the inhabitants of the neighborhood, especially in case of fire, and thus Antoine-Michel Perrache was entrusted to erect a new pump in 1759-60.

=== Fountain ===
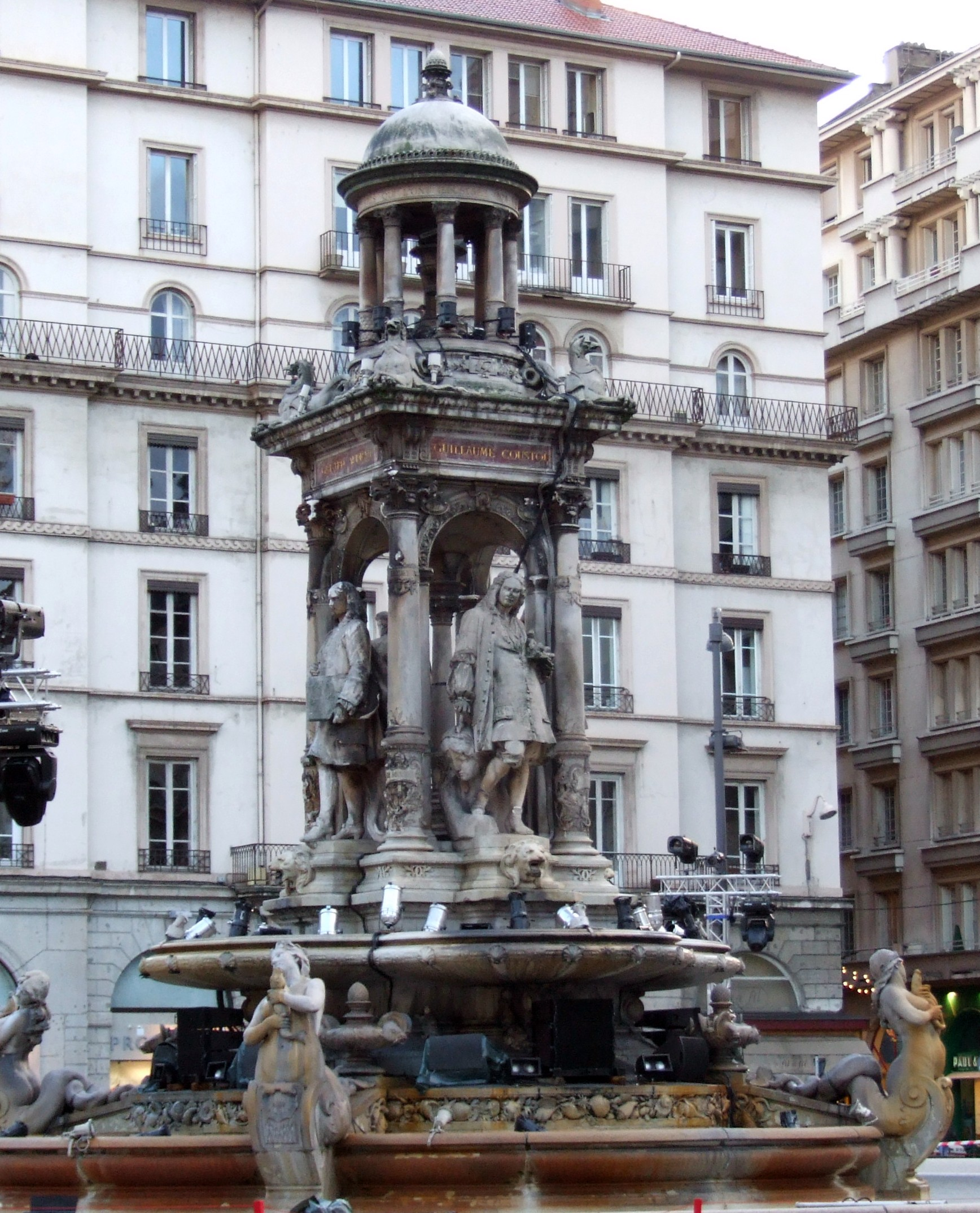
The fountain prior to its development, on the southern facade of the square

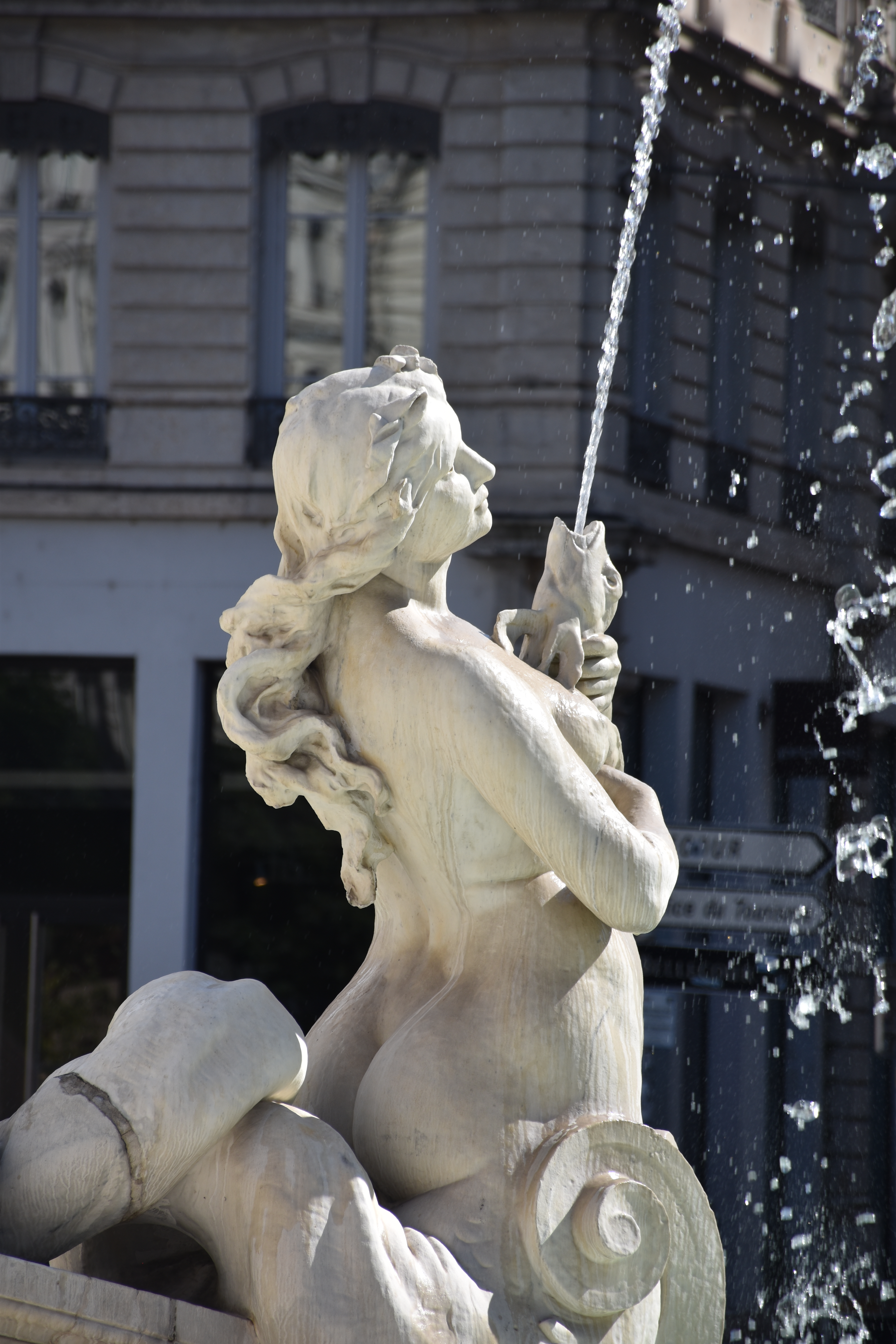
Eugène Delaplanche, Siren (1884), from the Fontaine des Jacobins

A fountain was erected in 1856 by Louis Danton, a wealthy upholsterer, who bequeathed his fortune for a work designed by Lienard and melted by Barbezat. In 1866, when the Rue Impériale (now Rue Édouard-Herriot) was opened, this rendered obsolete the fountain which was removed.

A new fountain, designed by Desjardins, was inaugurated in 1868 to commemorate Claude-Marius Vaïsse but this politician was not liked and the fountain diameter (41.75 meters) was deemed as too excessive. At the fall of the Second Empire in 1870, the statue was not yet installed and was hidden in the customs warehouse. The statue could have been recast to erect that of Claude Bernard, which was never done, but it was recast without glory in 1902. The circle of the fountain of Desjardins was disassembled and reassembled in 1877 on the Place Carnot to host the fountain of the Republic until its final destruction in 1975 during the re-development of the square and the construction of the subway of Lyon. It was decided in 1877 to build a new fountain on the Place des Jacobins : a competition was launched from 18 January to 30 June.

The city council decided to "give to the Place des Jacobins and Lyon (Place de la République) a monument". Two "second prizes" were awarded, one to Gaspard André for his project name "Art". He was appointed to lead the final study, and his project, presented on 28 February 1878, was approved in May. On 17 June 1878, a second competition attributed to Degeorges the creation of the four main statues : the statue of Jean-Hippolyte Flandrin was created in Paris and the other three, the statues of Gérard Audran, Guillaume Coustou and Philibert de l'Orme were carved in Lyon. The four artists are represented with their respective clothes. Although the contract scheduled the completion for 1 November 1878, the statues were not completed until 1885. The works took place on 20 December 1881 and the monument was inaugurated on 14 July 1885. The fountain was included in the supplementary inventory of monument historiques (ISMH, 18/05/1992).

== Architecture ==
Most buildings of the square are wealthy, with five decorated floors; and built circa 1850. The No. 1 was built in 1860 after plans by Frédéric Ginioz. The No. 4 of the Place des Jacobins is the painter Paul Borel's house, conducted by architect Pierre Bossan in 1863.

To the east, there is a large house, and in front, three small older ones. To the north, the building has slate roofs and, to the south-west, an eleven-storey building with rounded balconies.

== See also ==
- 2nd arrondissement of Lyon
- Gaspard André
- List of streets and squares in Lyon
- World Heritage Site
