= Place des Terreaux =

Square in Lyon, France

Coordinates: 45°46′03″N 4°50′01″E

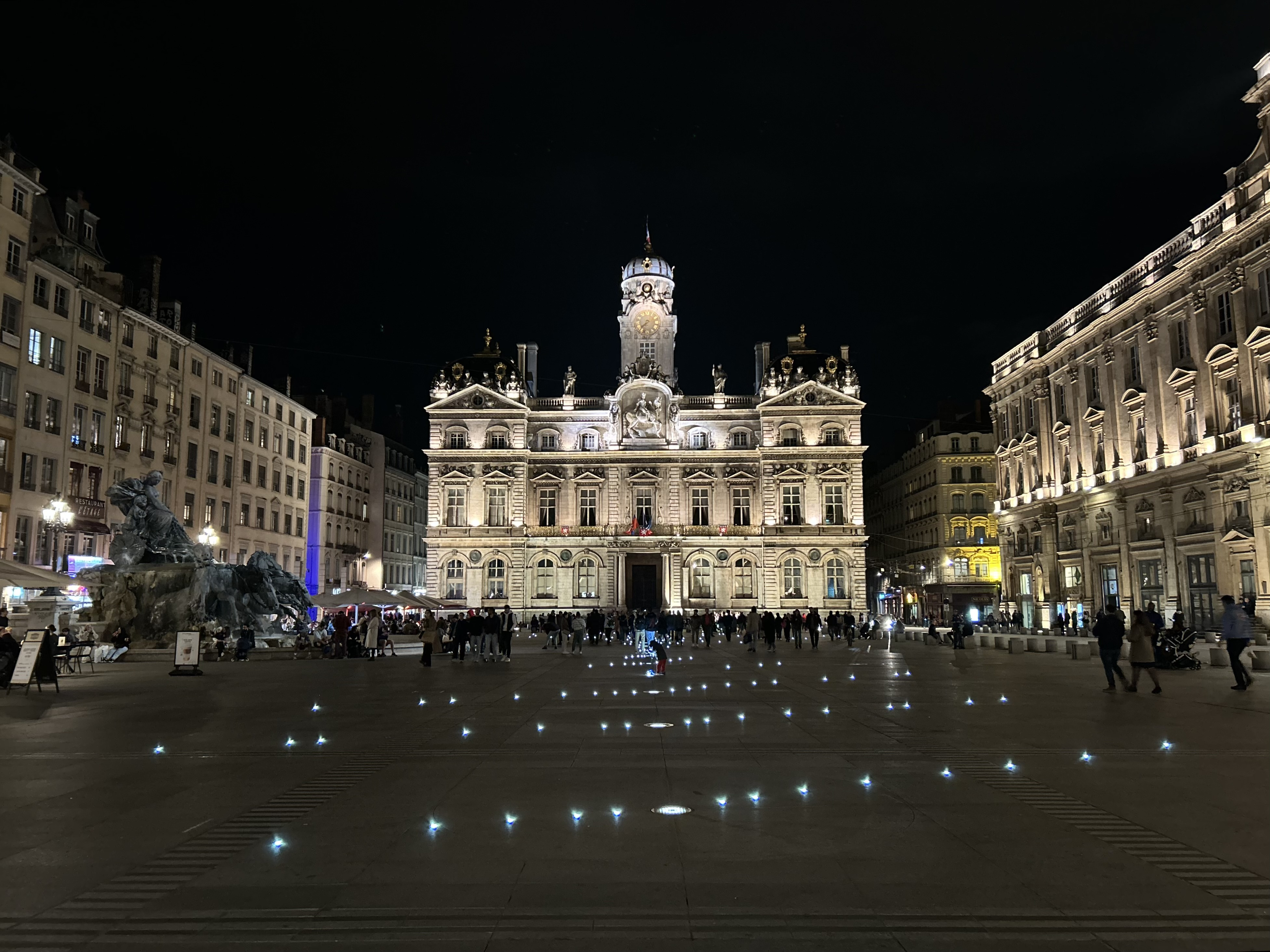
Terreaux Square with the Hôtel de Ville, the Fontaine Bartholdi and the Musée des Beaux-Arts de Lyon at night in 2025, after the second development of the square in 2019 by Daniel Buren and Christian Drevet.

The Place des Terreaux (French pronunciation: [plas de tɛʁo]) is a square located in the centre of Lyon, France, on the Presqu'île between the Rhône and the Saône rivers, at the foot of the hill of La Croix-Rousse in the 1st arrondissement. It borders both the Hôtel de Ville and Musée des Beaux-Arts de Lyon. The square belongs to the zone classified as a World Heritage Site by UNESCO.

== Location ==
The square has these borders:

- On the east by the Lyon City Hall
- On the south by the Palais Saint-Pierre and the Musée des Beaux-Arts de Lyon
- On the west by a building through a gallery
- On the north by civilian buildings marking the beginning of the slopes of the La Croix-Rousse

== History ==
=== The front wall of the square ===
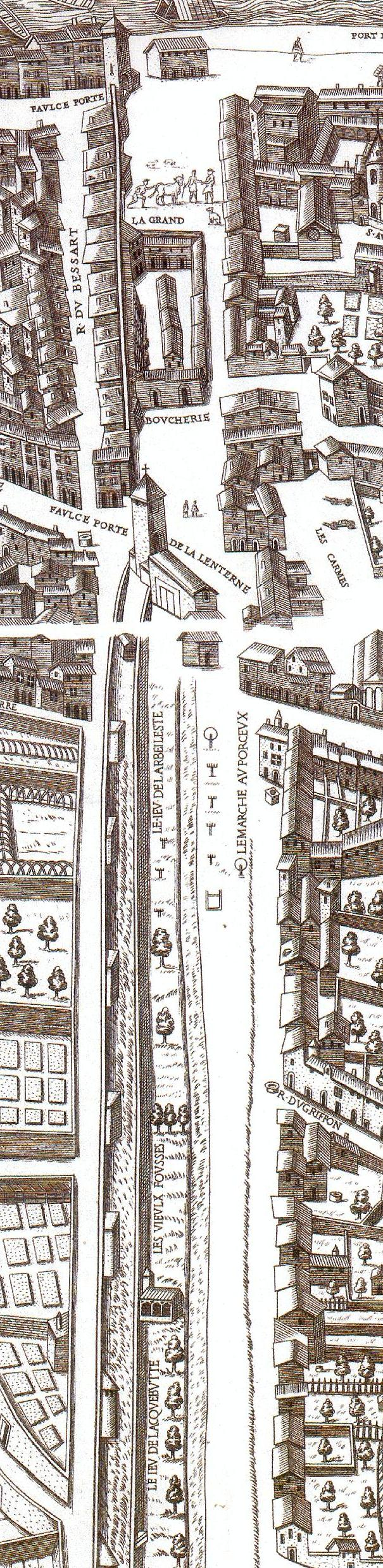
Extract of scenographic plan of Lyon in 1548

In 1206, associations of merchants of Lyon ran to Archbishop Renaud II de Forez, who failed to comply with the charter signed in 1195 by violating the agreements made in respect of taxes on goods. To protect the village of Saint-Nizier from ecclesiastical power, the bourgeois of Lyon then decided to raise a wall at the foot of the hill of Saint-Sébastien (slope of the Croix-Rousse) and a tower on the Saône to control the bridge of the Exchange, which was the sole passage between Saint-Nizier and Saint-Jean (a parish on the west side of the Saône, in Vieux Lyon); de Forez intervened by force of arms in 1208, and peace returned through the intervention of Pope Innocent III.

However, Renaud de Forez and his successors continued the works undertaken by the bourgeois of Lyon, in order to protect the city from a potential attack by the Dombes. A two-metre-thick and ten-metre-high new wall was built between the Saône and Rhône. Approximately 500 metres long, this enclosure was pierced by two gates defended by drawbridges (the Porte de la Pêcherie on the Saône and the Porte de la Lanterne) and protected by ten towers. A crenelated walk and five stone booths allowed soldiers to watch at the top. The main wall was separated by a 22-metre ditch from another two-metre wall located to the north. In the fourteenth century, a third structure built into the slope was added, then, at the beginning of the 15th century, a new structure was built on the Saint Sébastien hilltop, consisting of a mound of earth protected by wood towers. In case of siege, the ditch, which was called Terralia nova (Fossés of Terreaux) or Fossés de la Lanterne, could be filled with water. This one entered when needed in a succession of basins, called the Neyron channel, dug laterally to the Rhone.

Under normal circumstances, the crossbowmen, then culverin men used ditches as a training location, first on the Saône side, then from 1533 on the Rhône side.

=== The garden and the square ===
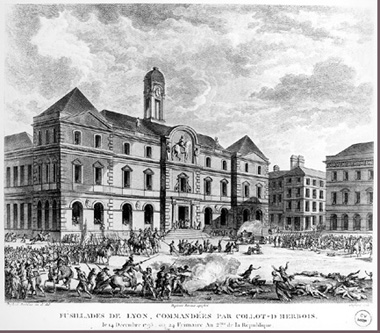
The siege of Lyon (1793).

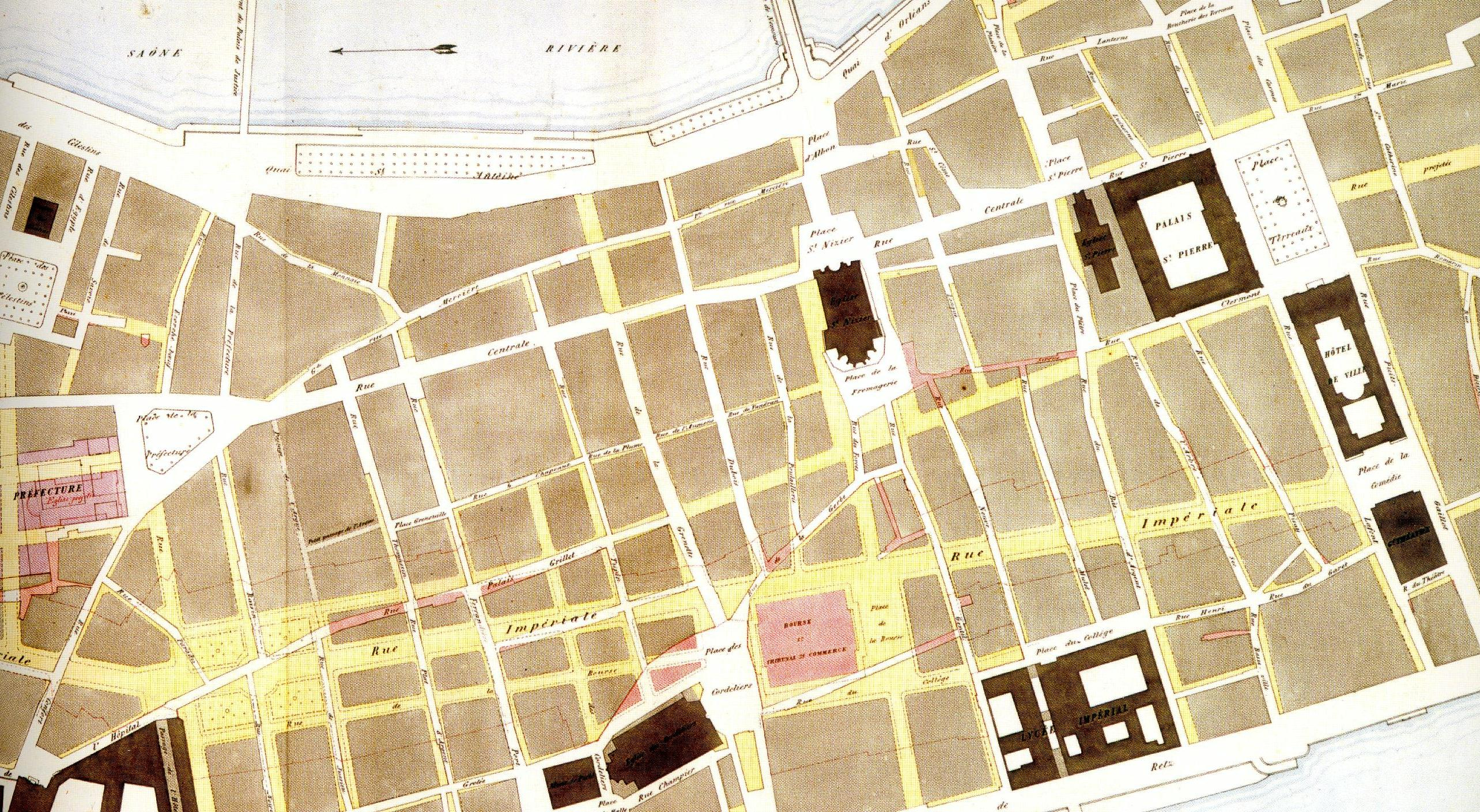
Plan of expansion of the Presqu'île streets leading to the square (1853).

In the 16th century, the walls crumbled. In 1538, the demolition of the enclosure was initiated. The ditch located on the Saône side was filled later to build the Boucherie de la Lanterne. In 1555, the nuns of the convent Saint-Pierre were allowed to use the stones of the wall to repair the monastery. In 1578, the lands of the current Place des Terreaux were filled, and in 1617, the former ditch disappeared with the development of the gardens of city hall on which the Opera stand today.

Between 1646 and 1651, Simon Maupin built on the eastern side of the square the Hôtel de ville de Lyon, rebuilt by Jules Hardouin-Mansart, after the fire of 1674. In the 17th century, the nuns of Saint-Pierre rebuilt their convent, which became in 1803 the Musée des Beaux-Arts de Lyon.

On this square was beheaded the Henri Coiffier de Ruzé, Marquis of Cinq-Mars, who was a conspirator against Richelieu. During the French Revolution, the guillotine was installed and running at full speed during the tenure of Marie Joseph Chalier. After the siege of Lyon, 79 people were also beheaded.

In the second half of the 19th century, access to the site was expanded to accommodate the restructuring plan of the peninsula led by Claude-Marius Vaïsse. In 1855, the passage of Terreaux was opened between the square and the Rue Lanterne. The prefect also planned to drill a new street in the north axis of the Palais Saint-Pierre, but this project was never realized.

At the center of the square, the municipal officials inaugurated on 22 September 1891 an allegorical fountain of the Saône, made by Frédéric Auguste Bartholdi. The sculpted group called Char triomphant de la Garonne represents the Garonne and its four tributaries jumping into the ocean, all of which are symbolized by a woman leading a Quadriga. After the 1889 Exposition Universelle, the monument became too expensive for the city of Bordeaux and was bought in 1890 by the Mayor of Lyon, Antoine Gailleton.

The square was redeveloped in 1994 by architect and urban planner Christian Drevet and artist Daniel Buren, including an orthogonal rotation of 69 jets of water lined with 14 pillars. To build the underground parking of the square, the fountain was originally located in front of city hall, then moved to its current location in the axis of the Palais Saint-Pierre.

On 29 September 1995, the square was classified as a monument historique.

During the cold winter of 2012, the fountain situated in the Place des Terreaux froze.

== Gallery ==
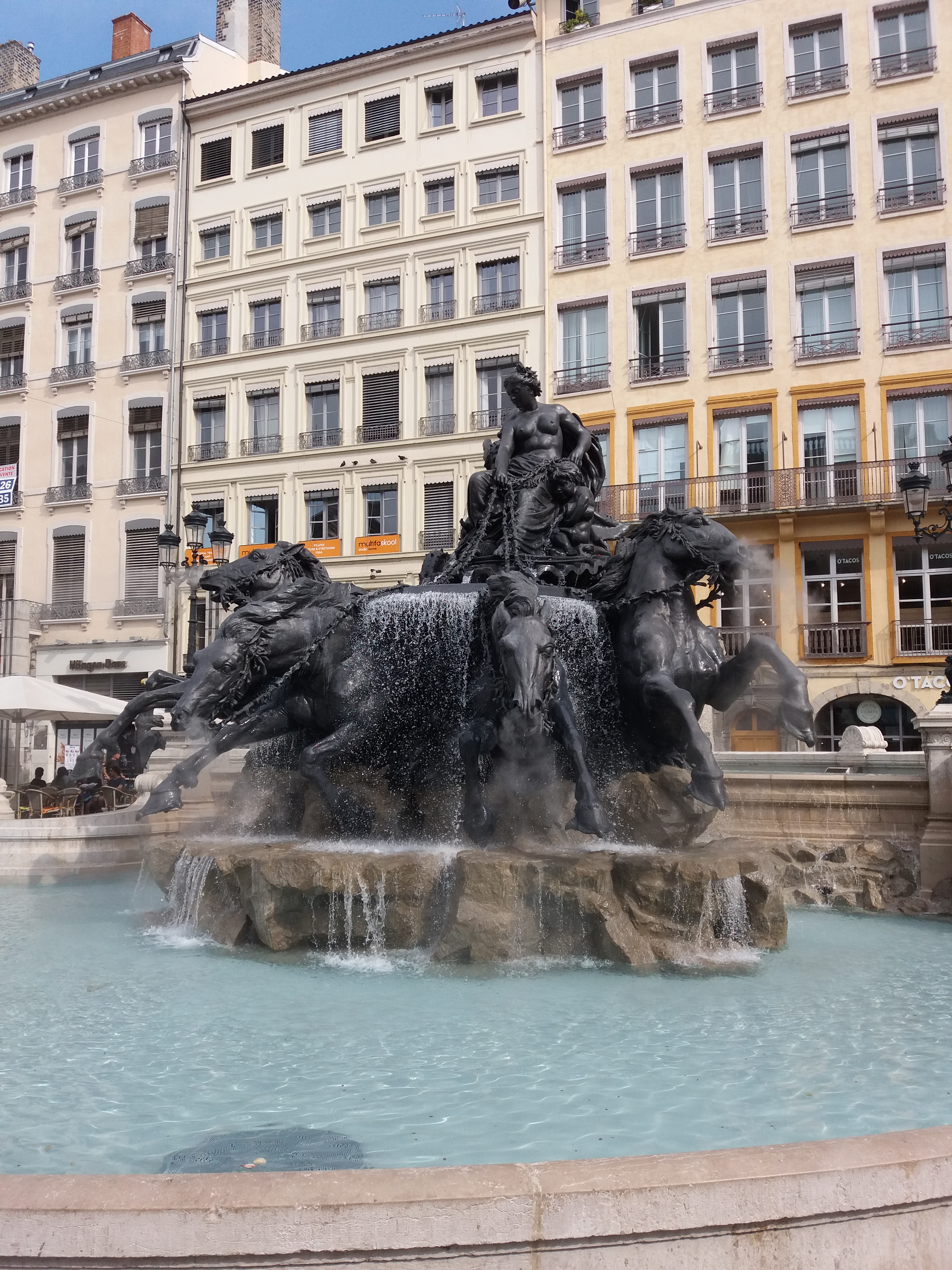
The Fontaine Bartholdi on the square

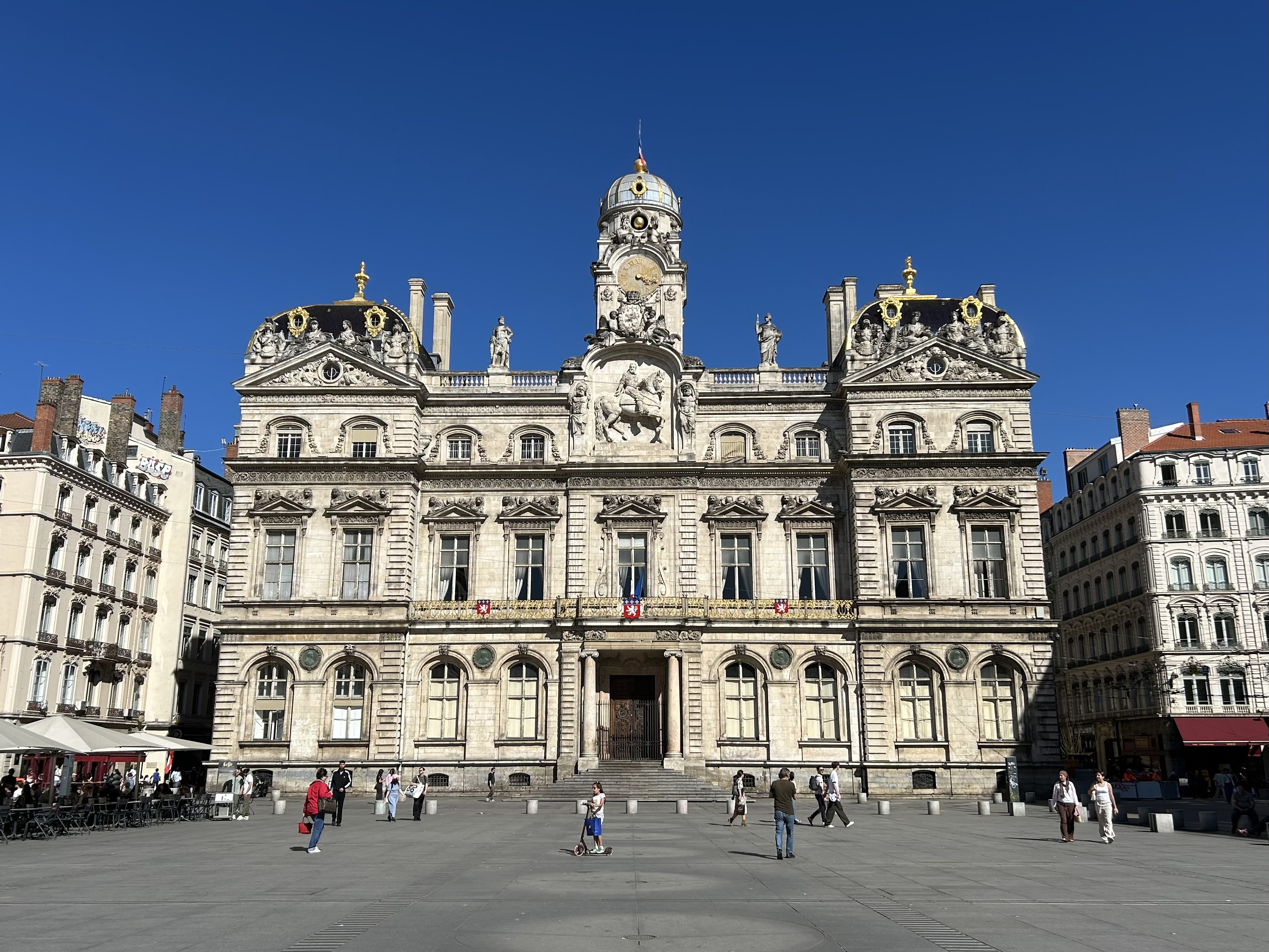
Lyon City Hall in 2026.

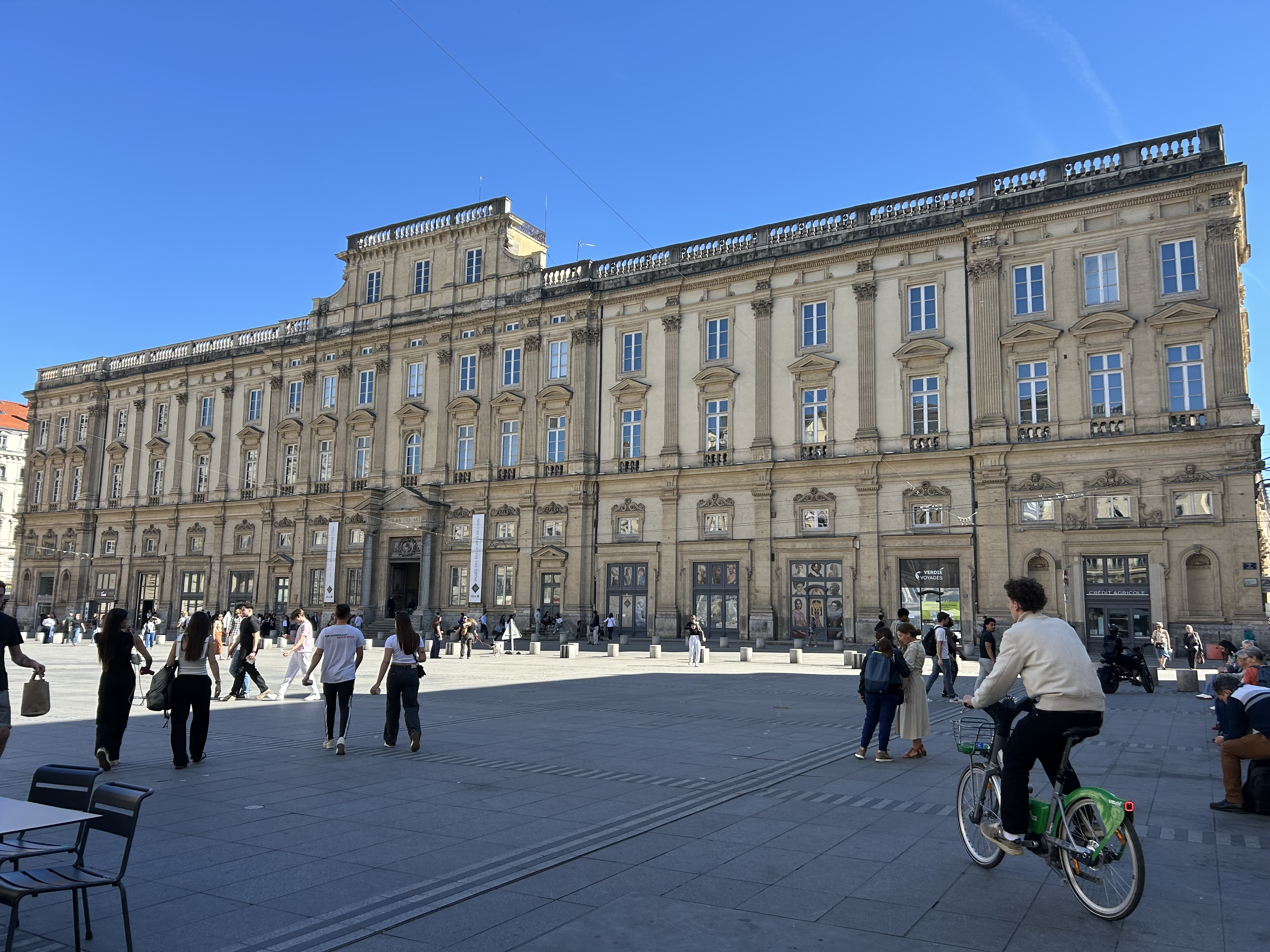
Museum of Fine Arts in 2026.

== See also ==
- List of streets and squares in Lyon
