= Presqu'île =

Part of Lyon, France

Coordinates: 45°45′5″N 4°49′40″E

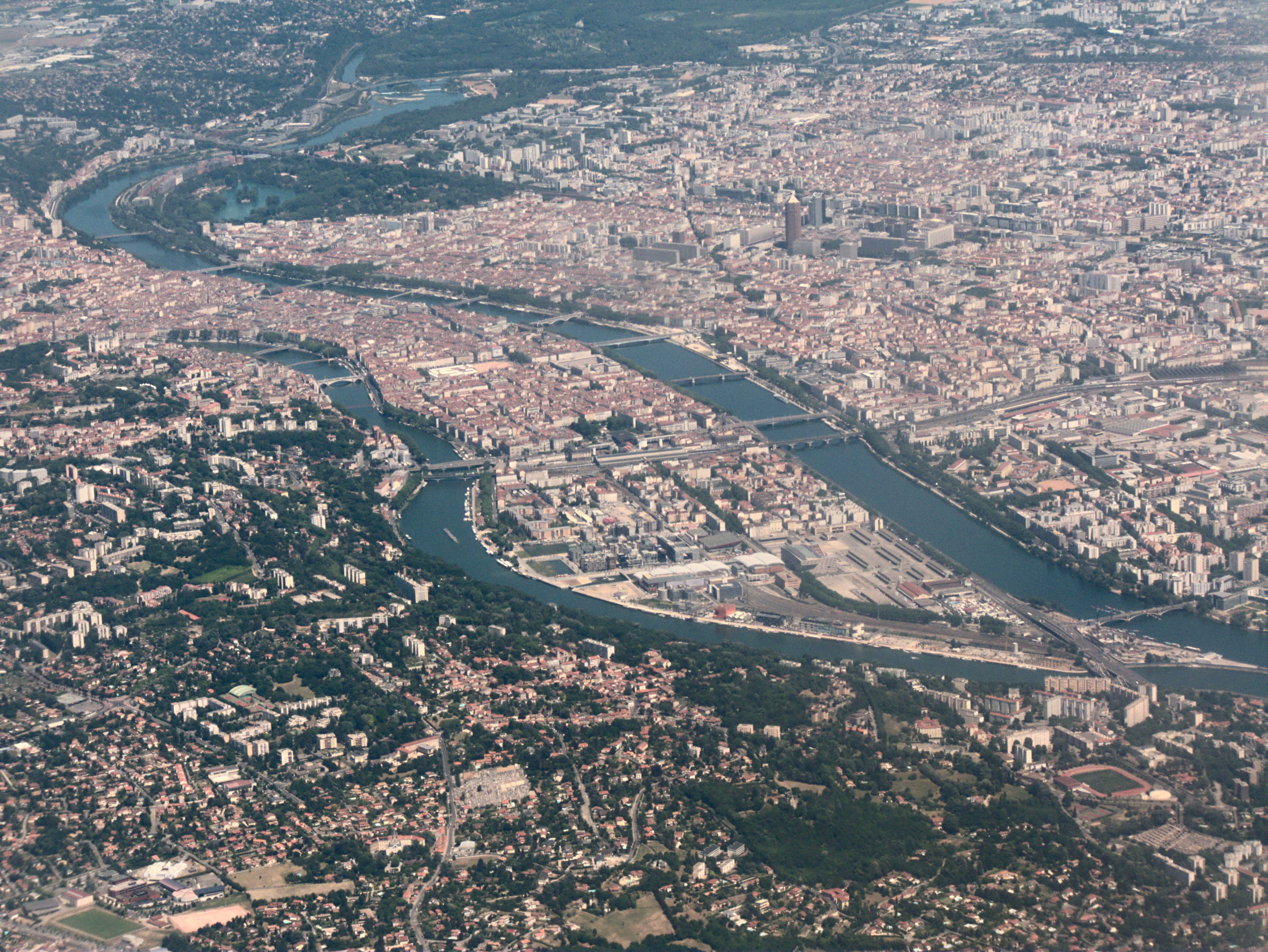
Lyon's Presqu'île between the Saône and Rhône rivers seen from the southwest in 2011

The Presqu'île (pronounced [pʁɛskil]; literally "almost an island" in French, meaning "peninsula") is the central part of the City of Lyon, France. Extending from the foot of the Croix-Rousse hill in the north to the confluence of the Rhône and the Saône rivers in the south, it has a preponderance of cafés, restaurants, luxury shops, department stores, banks, government buildings and cultural institutions.

The 1st and 2nd arrondissements of the city are located here, along with the Hôtel de Ville, Lyon's city hall in its 1st arrondissement. The spires of the Church of St. Nizier, rebuilt from the 14th to the 16th centuries, are at the foot of the former Saône river bridge. With a history stretching back to the Middle Ages, Lyon's Presqu'île was inscribed on the UNESCO World Heritage List along with other districts in Lyon as a testimony to Lyon's long history as an important European city and its architecture.

== History ==
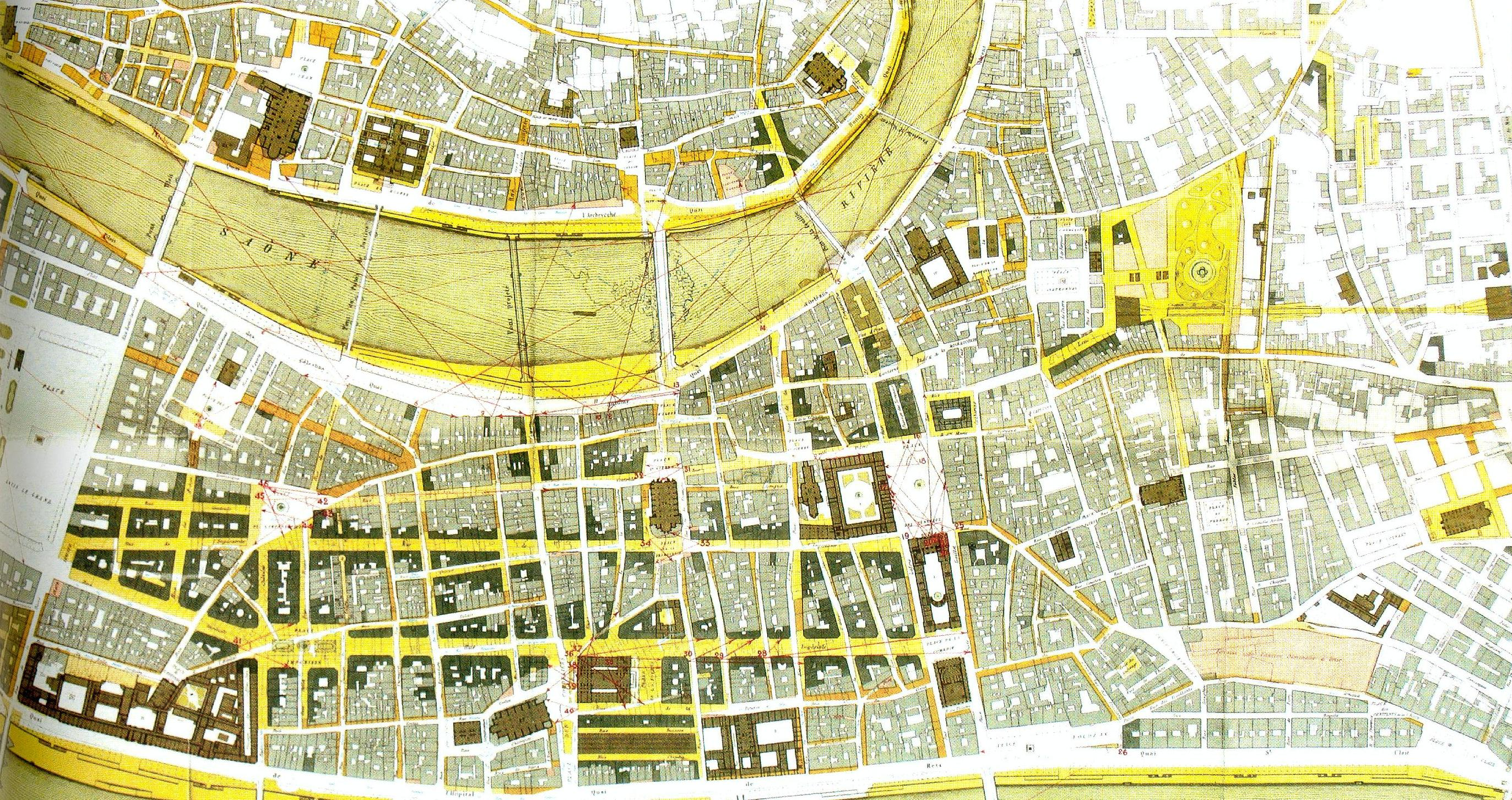
Plan of works and buildings on the Presqu'île, 1863

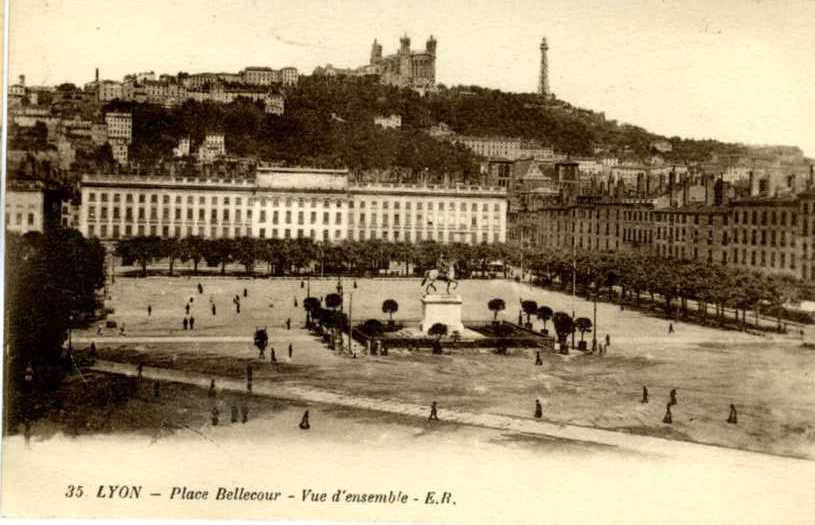
Place Bellecour with the Basilica of Notre-Dame in Fourvière c. 1910

This district was an important counterpoint to the Vieux Lyon district in the Middle Ages and the Renaissance. Many picturesque streets still exist. Among these is the rue Mercière, where printers and booksellers gravitated in the 15th and 16th centuries and which still has some superb buildings. The Museum of Printing, housed in the former Hôtel de la Couronne, explains how Lyon’s first books were printed. Squares (in many cases decorated with fountains) and churches sprinkled throughout evoke the presence of numerous convents, including those of the Dominicans (Jacobins), the Celestines and the Conventual Franciscans (Cordeliers), whose St. Bonaventure Church was rebuilt in the 14th century. Further south, the Church of Saint-Martin d’Ainay in the Ainay area was originally the church of Ainay Abbey, a large Benedictine monastery, and is still a jewel of Romanesque art in Lyon.

The Place des Terreaux was created in the 17th century, owing to the construction of two prestigious structures:

- The Hôtel de Ville, or City Hall, was built between 1646 and 1655 by the architect Simon Maupin and decorated by the painter Thomas Blanchet. In 1674, the Great Hall was ravaged by fire, and the façade facing the square was redesigned in the early 18th century by Jules Hardouin Mansart.
- The St. Pierre Palace, formerly a royal Benedictine abbey, construction of which began in 1659 by the Avignon architect François de Royers de la Valfenière. It now houses the Museum of Fine Arts. The public garden in the former cloister is decorated with the work of famous sculptors and is a quiet, urban oasis. In the 17th and 18th centuries the Place Bellecour was created in honour of King Louis XIV.

Nowadays, the Place des Terreaux hosts several restaurants and an impressive statue of a woman on a chariot; it is a common sightseeing destination within Lyon.

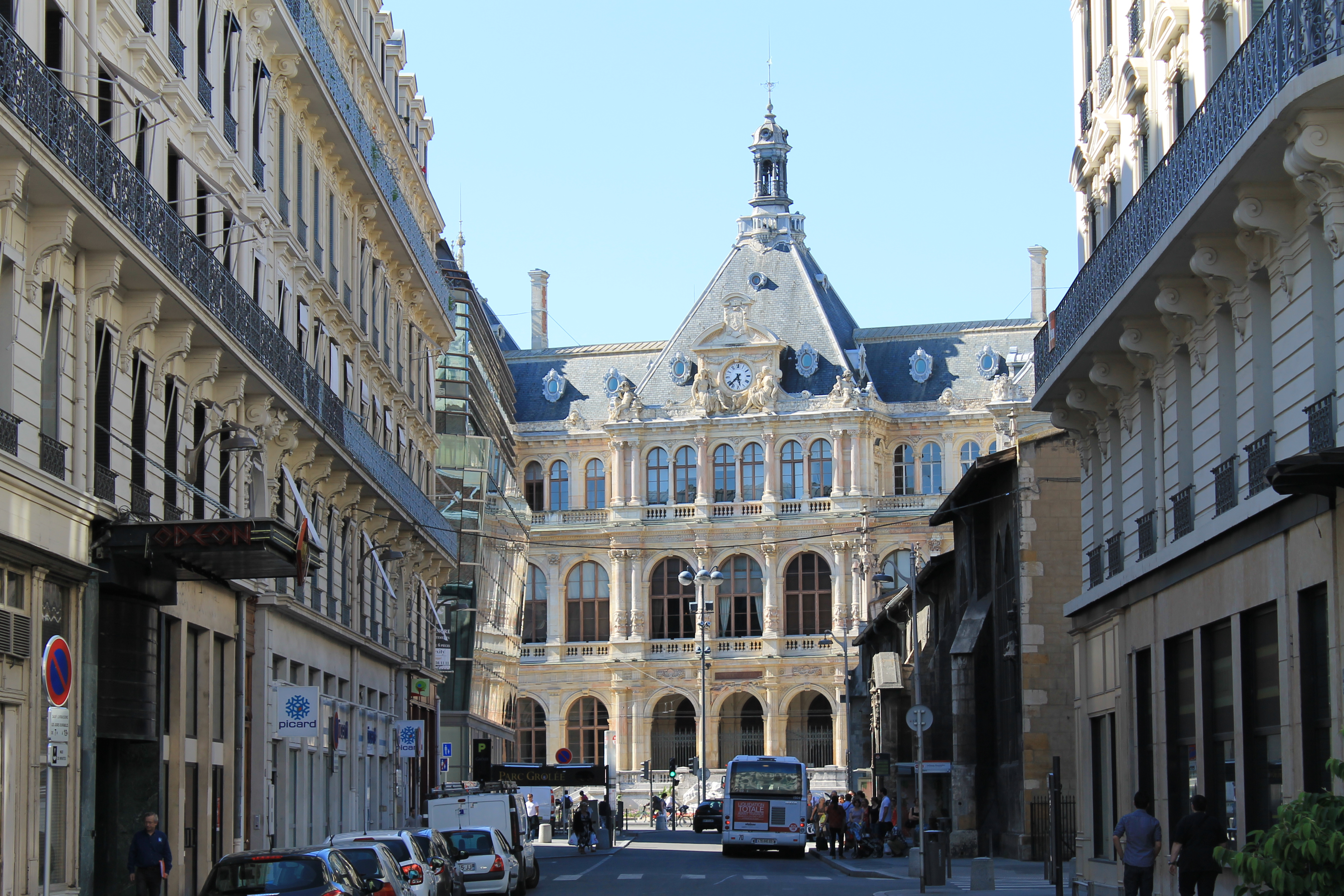
Palais de la Bourse in the Cordeliers district

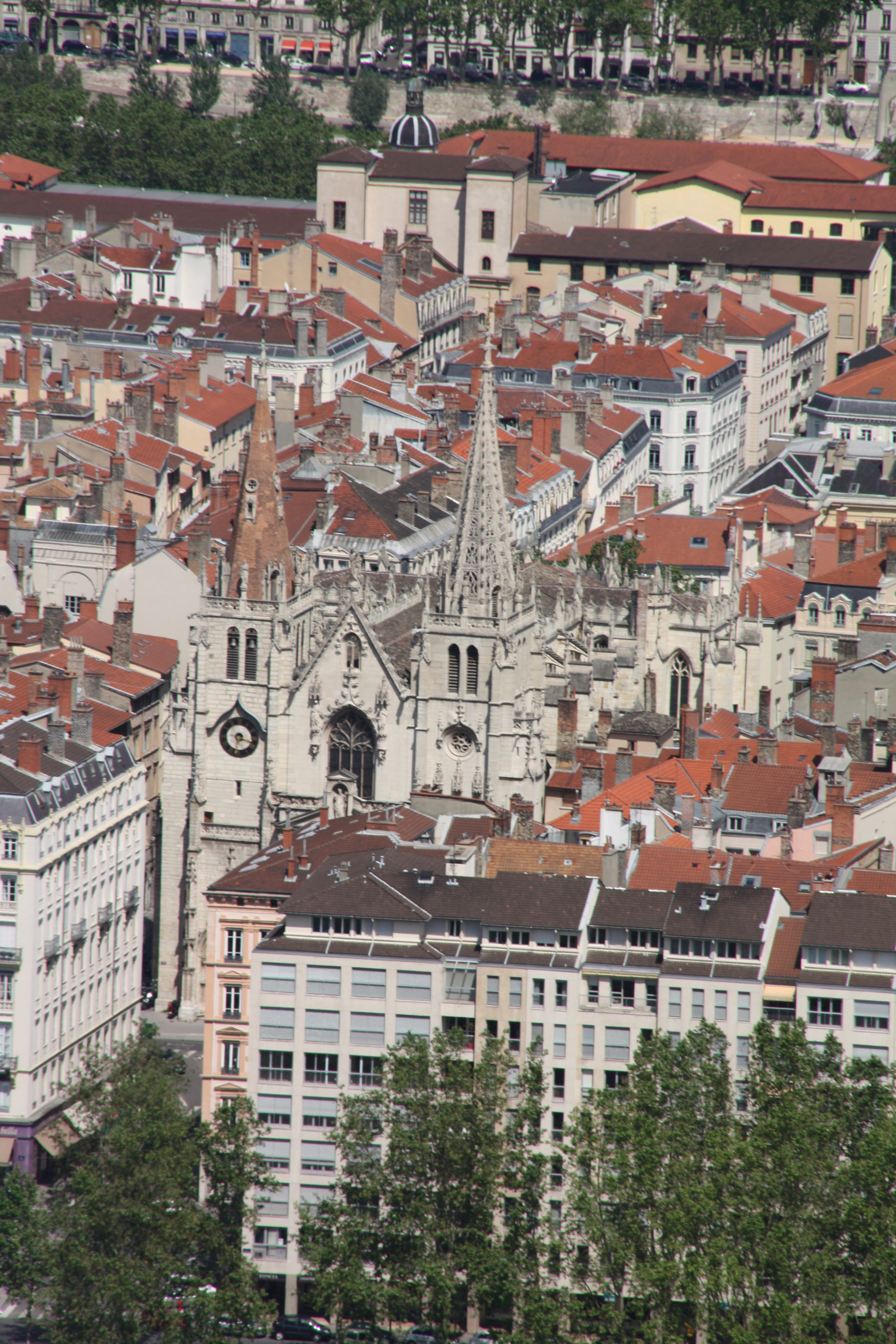
Church of St. Nizier seen from Fourvière

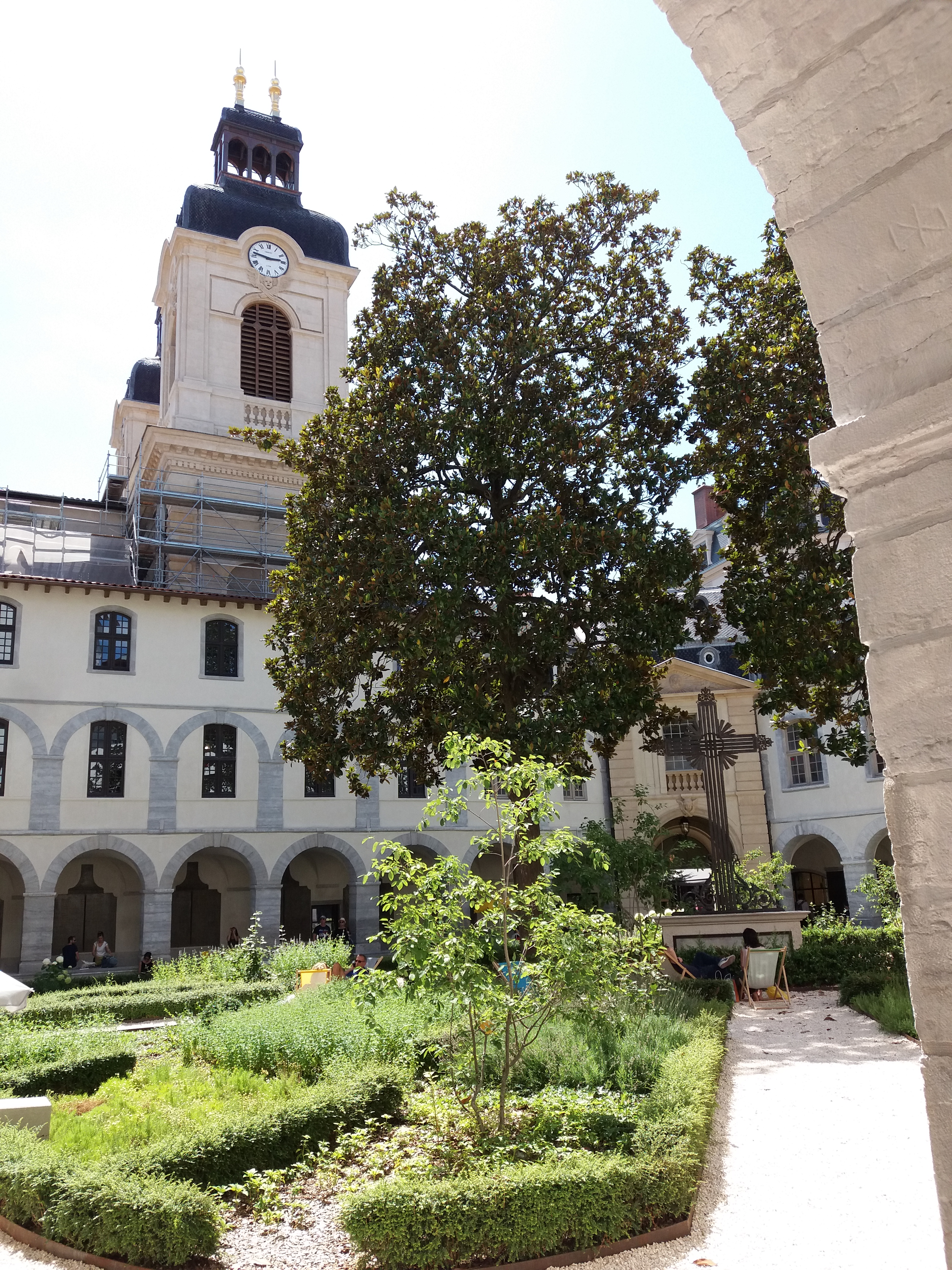
Hôtel-Dieu

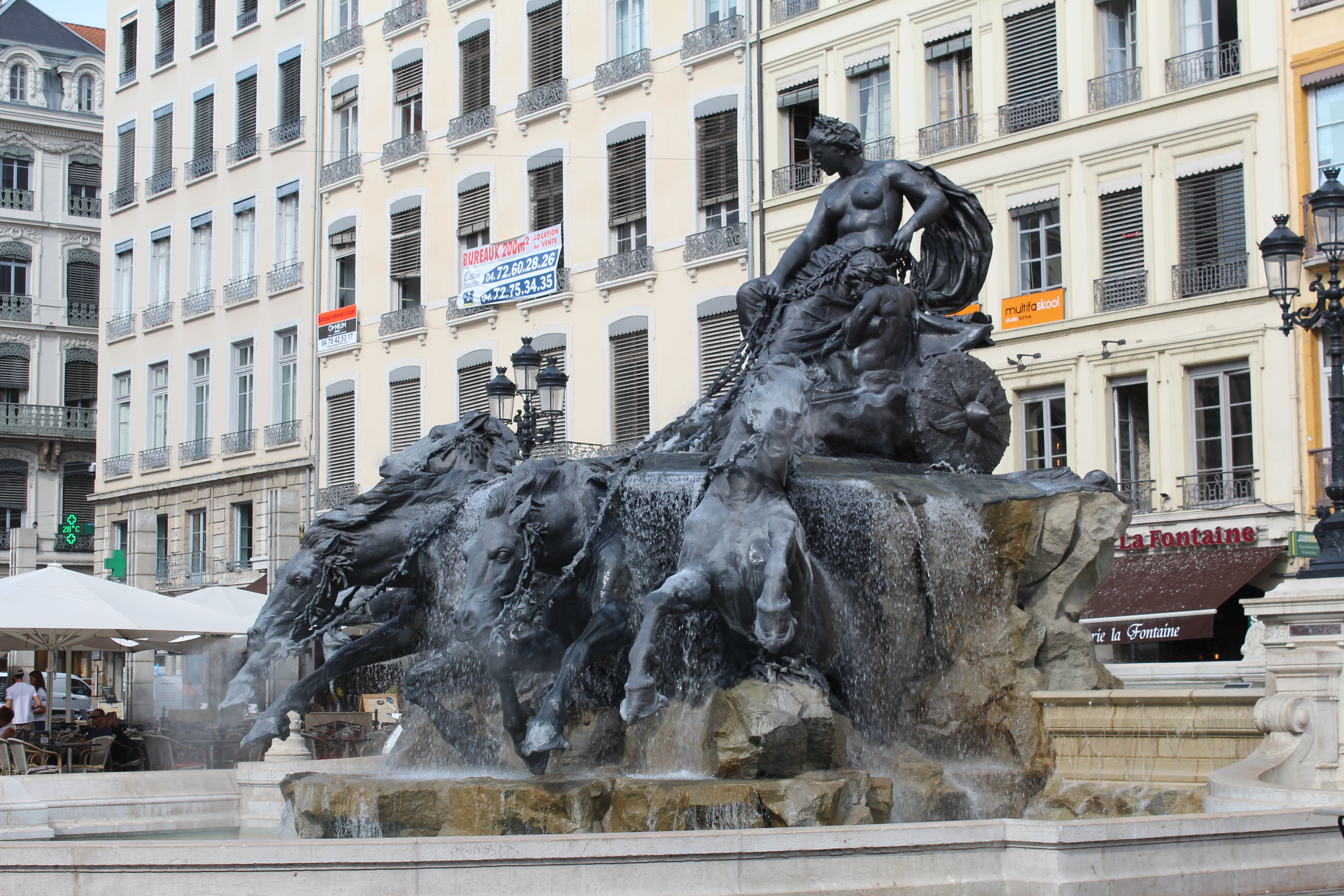
Bartholdi fountain, Place des Terreaux

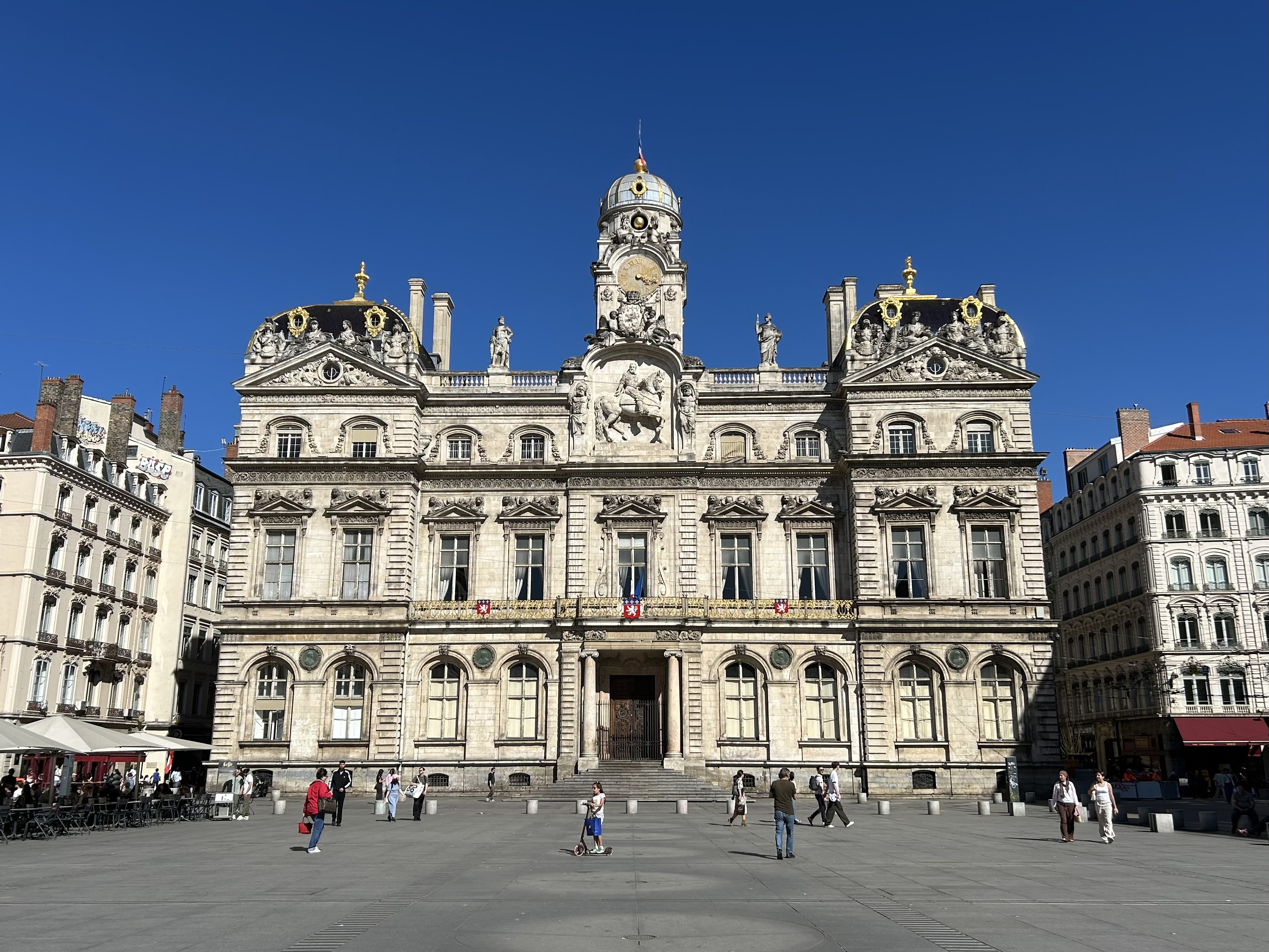
Hôtel de Ville in 2026, seen from the place des Terreaux.

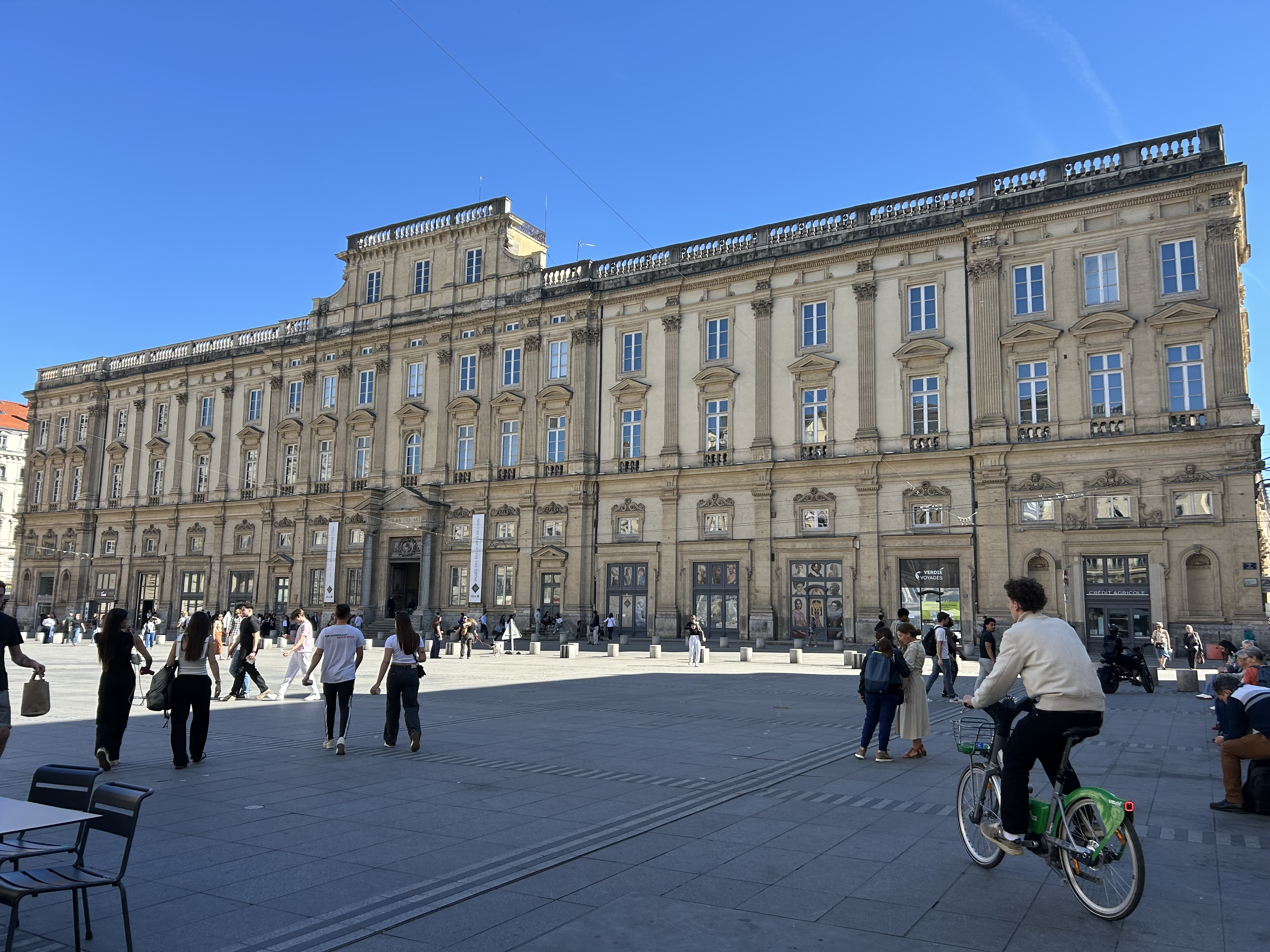
Museum of Fine Arts in 2026, seen from the place des Terreaux.

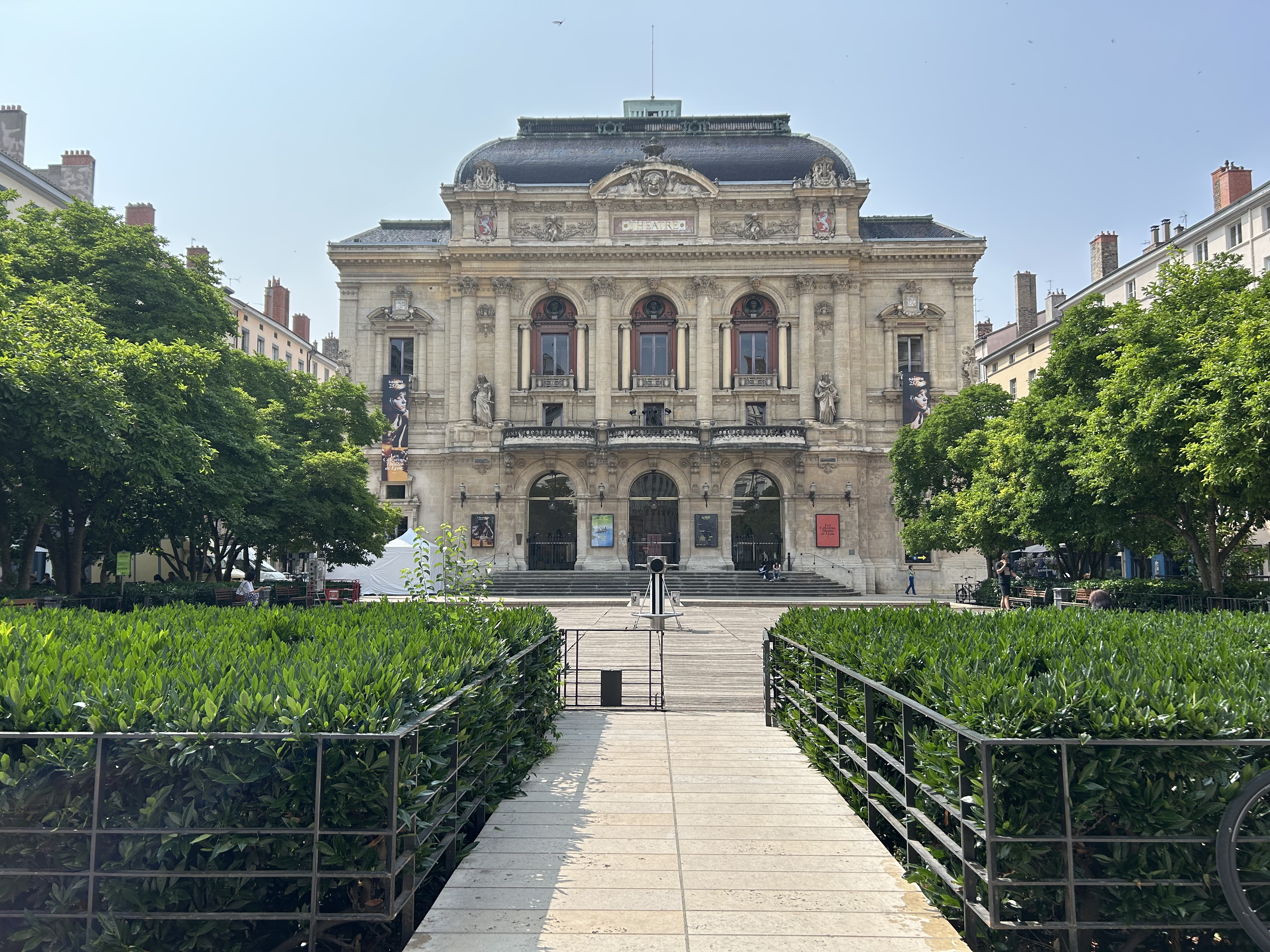
Théâtre des Célestins and the place of the same name in 2025.

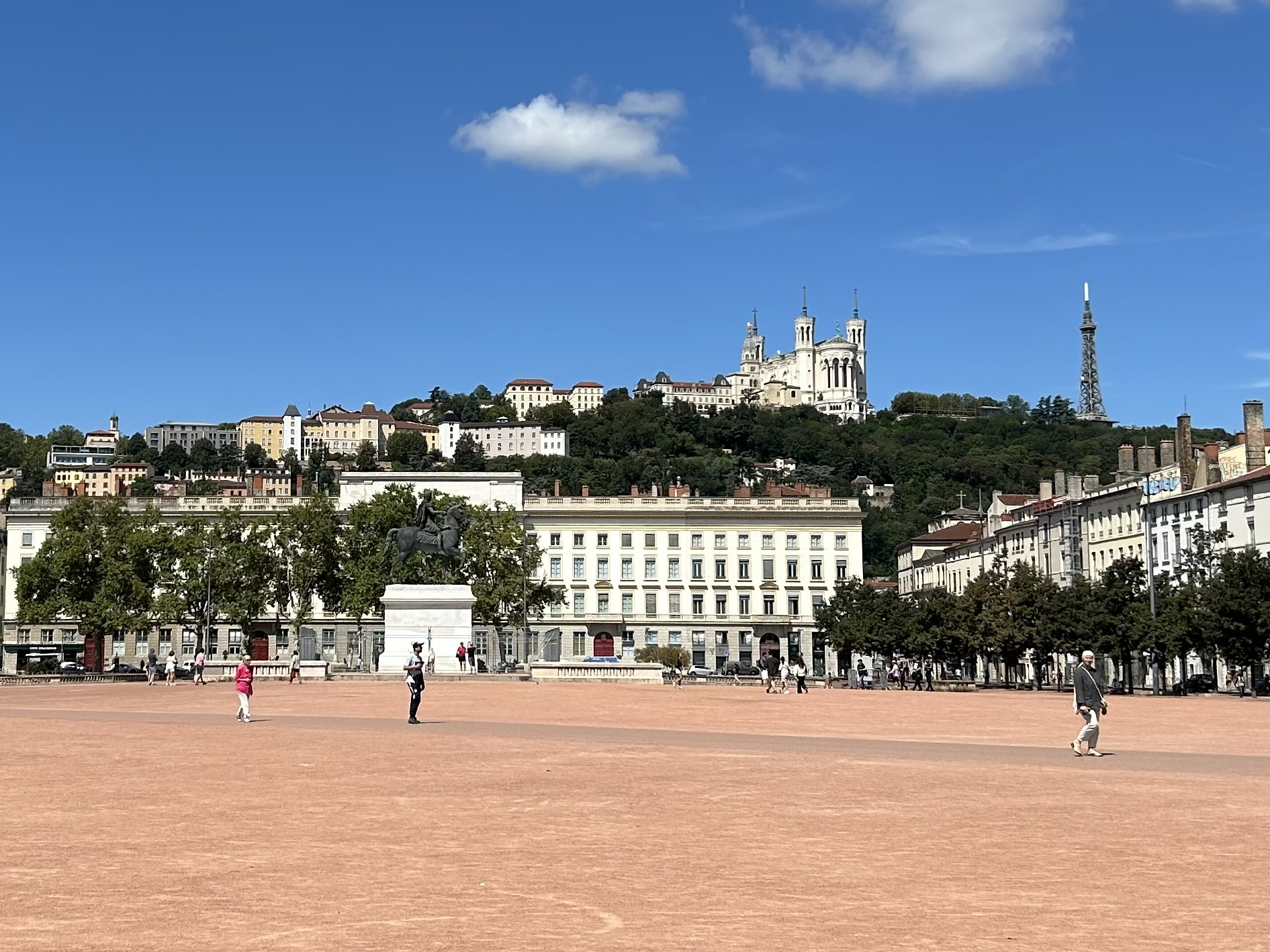
Place Bellecour in 2024, with the Fourvière hill in its background.

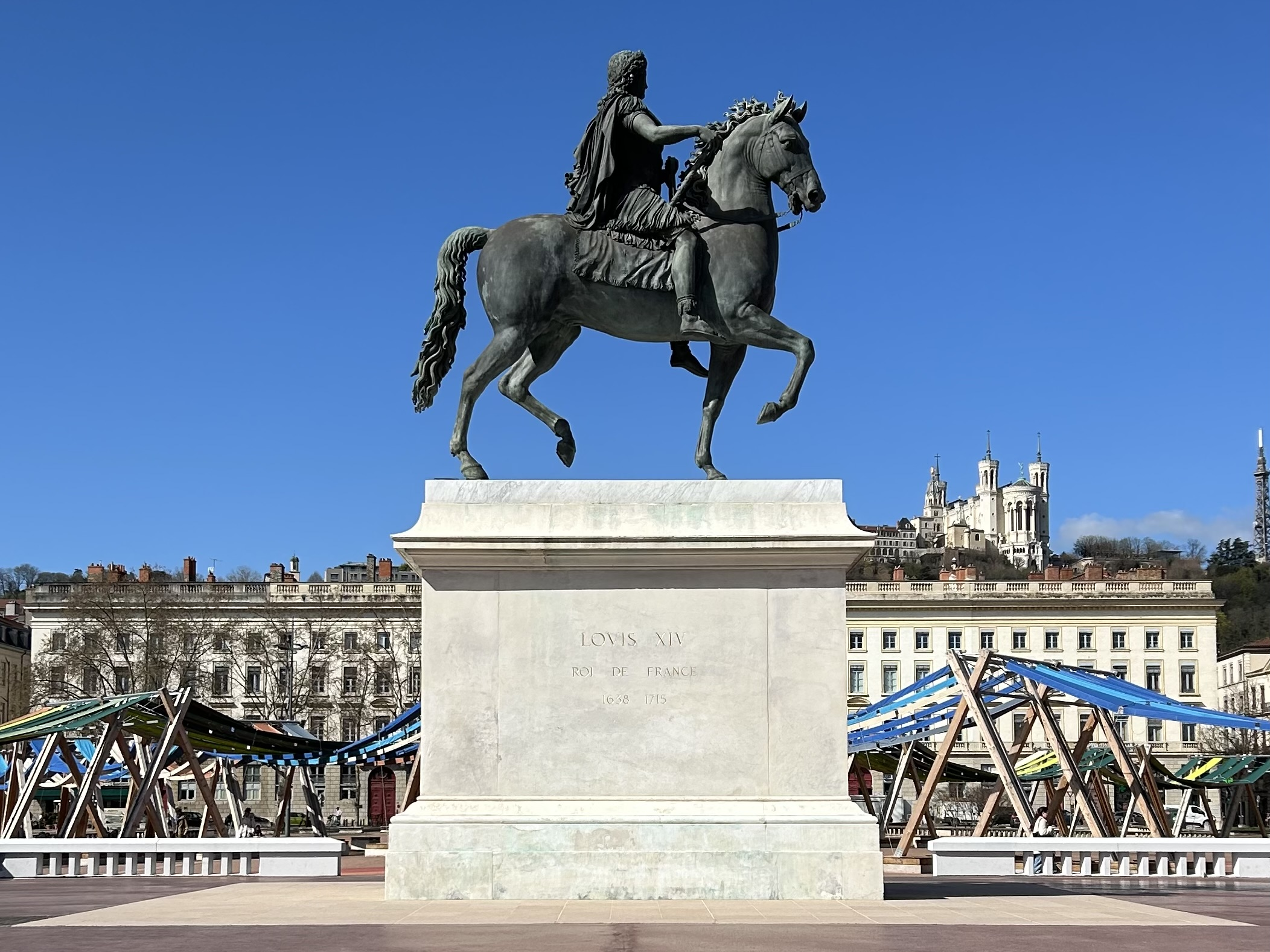
Louis XIV’s equestrian statue in place Bellecour in 2026.

== Modern times ==
Jacques-Germain Soufflot expanded the hospital located near the old Rhône bridge, building the Hôtel-Dieu de Lyon along the banks of the river. Today, the hospital is closed. In the 2010s, works were underway to renovate the building, which now hosts a five-star InterContinental hotel, shops, offices, apartments and the new Cité de la gastronomie. Numerous hôtels particuliers were built in the vicinity of the Place Bellecour. The Hôtel du Gouverneur, built in 1730, now houses the Musée des Tissus (Museum of Textiles) and the Hôtel de Lacroix Laval, designed by Soufflot, is now the Museum of Decorative Arts. In 1855, during France's Second Empire period, Claude-Marius Vaïsse, Prefect of the Rhône département, created the Rue de la République and Rue Édouard-Herriot as part of a series of large construction projects. The Stock Exchange, built in 1860, is an example of the Napoleon III style and is in the heart of the banking district. In the 19th century, two theatres were built: the Célestins Theatre and the Grand Theatre, the latter of which is now the opera house, rebuilt in 1993 by Jean Nouvel. These are two of the city’s major cultural centres.

Though the business centre is located to the east in the 3rd arrondissement, road signs pointing to the centre of the city take drivers to Place Bellecour in the 2nd.

This zone is served by the metro lines, and.

== See also ==
- History of Lyon
