= Hôtel de Ville, Lyon =

UNESCO World Heritage building in Lyon, France

Hôtel de Ville
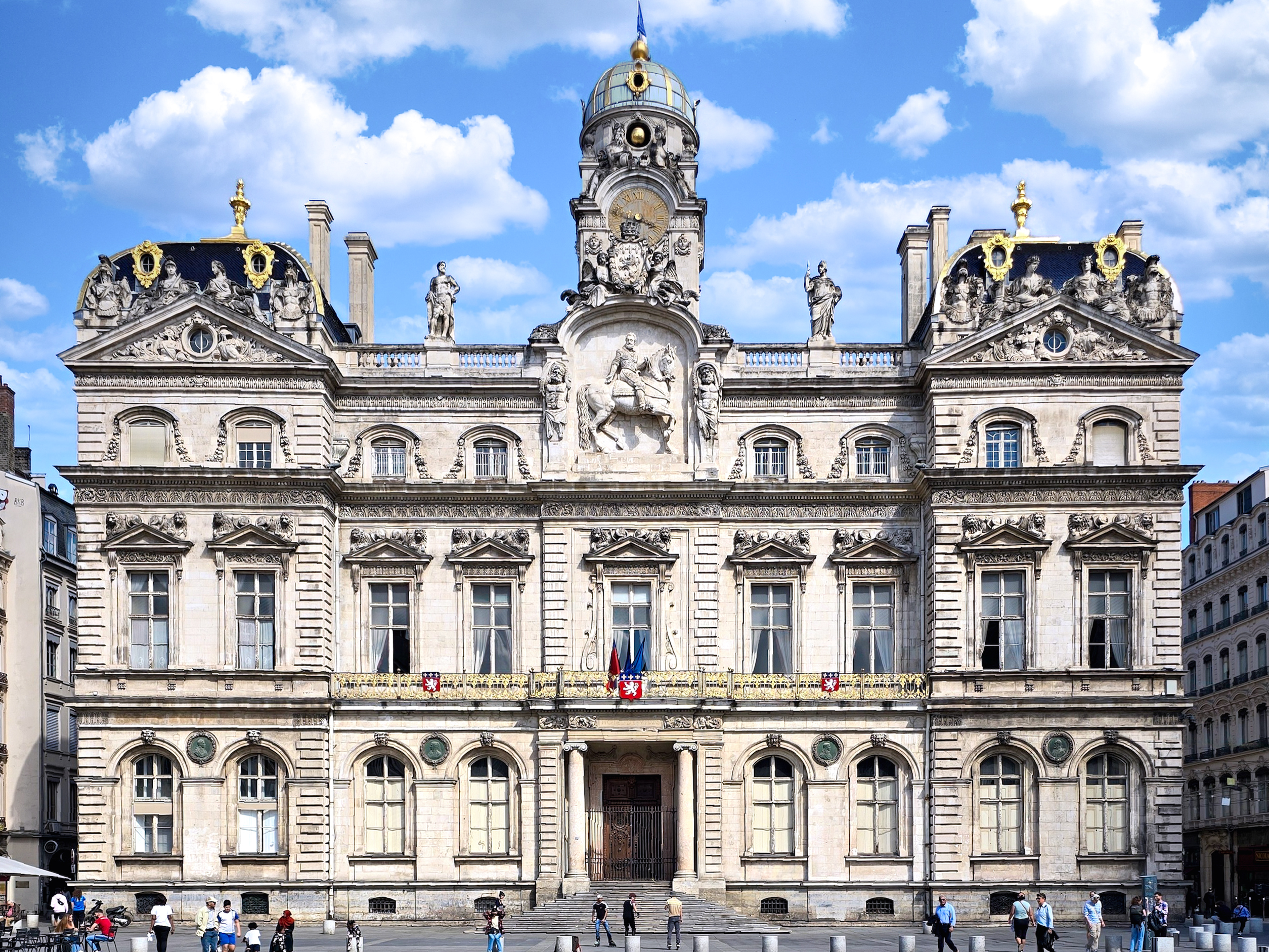
- The main frontage of the Hôtel de Ville in May 2025

General information
- Type: City hall
- Architectural style: Renaissance Revival style
- Location: Lyon, France
- Coordinates: 45.7676°N 4.8350°E
- Completed: 1652

Design and construction
- Architects: Simon Maupin

UNESCO World Heritage Site
- Part of: Historic Site of Lyon
- Criteria: Cultural: i, ii, iv
- Reference: 872
- Inscription: 1998 (22nd Session)

Monument historique
- Official name: Hôtel de Ville
- Type: Inscrit
- Designated: 1886
- Reference no.: PA00117820

The Hôtel de Ville (French pronunciation: [otɛl də vil], City Hall) is the city hall of Lyon, France, and one of the largest historic buildings in the city. The building is located between the Place des Terreaux and the Place de la Comédie, in front of the Opéra Nouvel. It was designated a monument historique by the French government in 1886.

== History ==
Much of Lyon was redeveloped in the 17th century, with the Presqu'île becoming the city centre. As part of the masterplan for the area the council decided to commission a new town hall for Lyon. The site they selected was between the Place des Terreaux and the Place de la Comédie.

Construction of the new building was deliberately timed to commence on the birthday of King Louis XIV, 5 September 1646. It was designed by Simon Maupin in the Renaissance Revival style, built ashlar stone and the council held their first meeting there on 14 November 1652. The design involved a symmetrical main frontage of nine bays facing west onto the Place des Terreaux with the end two bays on either side projected forward as pavilions. The central bay featured a square-headed doorway flanked by Ionic order columns supporting an entablature. The other bays on the ground floor were fenestrated by round-headed windows with architraves and keystones. The bays on the first floor were fenestrated by square-headed windows with triangular pediment, while the bays on the second floor were fenestrated by segmental headed windows. In the centre bay on the second floor there was a half-relief of King Louis XIV on horseback, and at roof level, there was a balustraded parapet and some finely carved sculptures, as well as a central clock tower with a dome. The Grande Salle, the Staircase of Honour, the Salon de la Conservation, and the Salon de la Nomination were all decorated by the French painter, Thomas Blanchet.

Following a fire on 13 September 1674, the building, including its façade, was restored and modified to design by Jules Hardouin-Mansart and his pupil Robert de Cotte.

In March 1793, during the French Revolution, the building was under the control of a group of counter-revolutionaries, led by Joseph Chalier, who were in revolt against the National Convention. This was brought to an end by the siege of Lyon between August and October 1793. The half-relief depicting King Louis XIV on horseback, in the middle of the façade was removed by the revolutionaries at this time. It was replaced during the Restoration with a half-relief depicting King Henry IV in the same posture.

On 22 March 1871, inspired by the establishment of the Paris Commune, a crowd of revolutionary guardsmen stormed the city hall and proclaimed the establishment of a similar commune in Lyon. They arrested the mayor and the prefect of the city. However, the insurrection only lasted a few days and on 25 March 1871, the revolutionaries left the building peacefully. During the liberation of the town on 3 September 1944, during the Second World War, the 1st Free French Division, supported by the US 36th Infantry Division and the French Forces of the Interior seized the town hall. In 2005, its belfry was added to the UNESCO World Heritage Site group of the Belfries of Belgium and France.

== Gallery ==
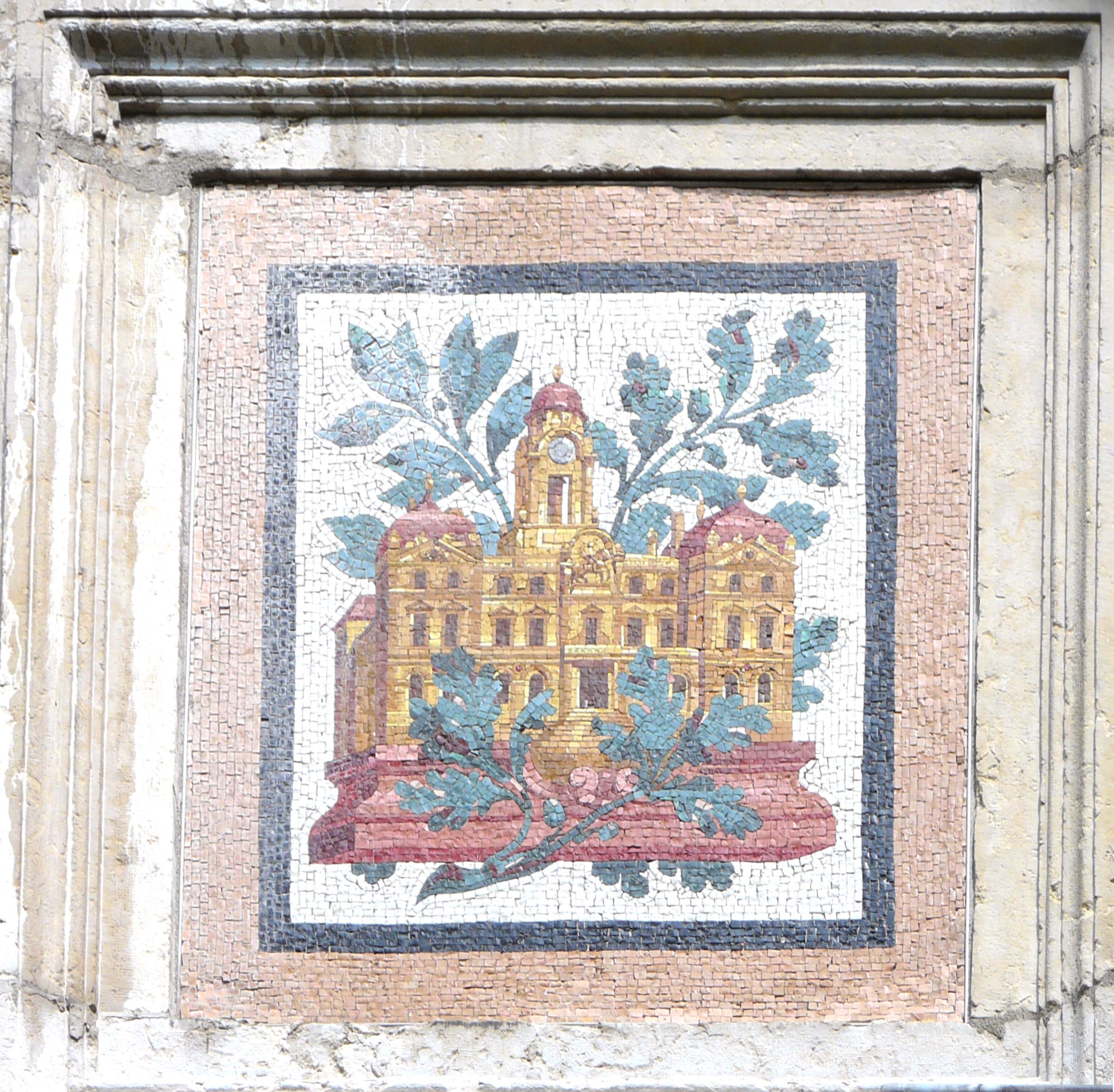
Mosaic representing the City Hall in the park of the Musée des Beaux-Arts de Lyon

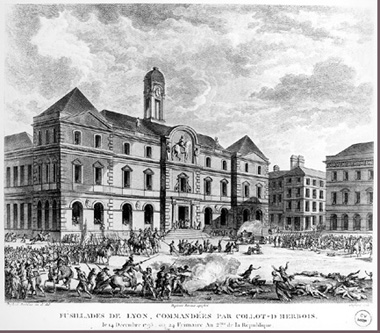
The City Hall during the siege of Lyon

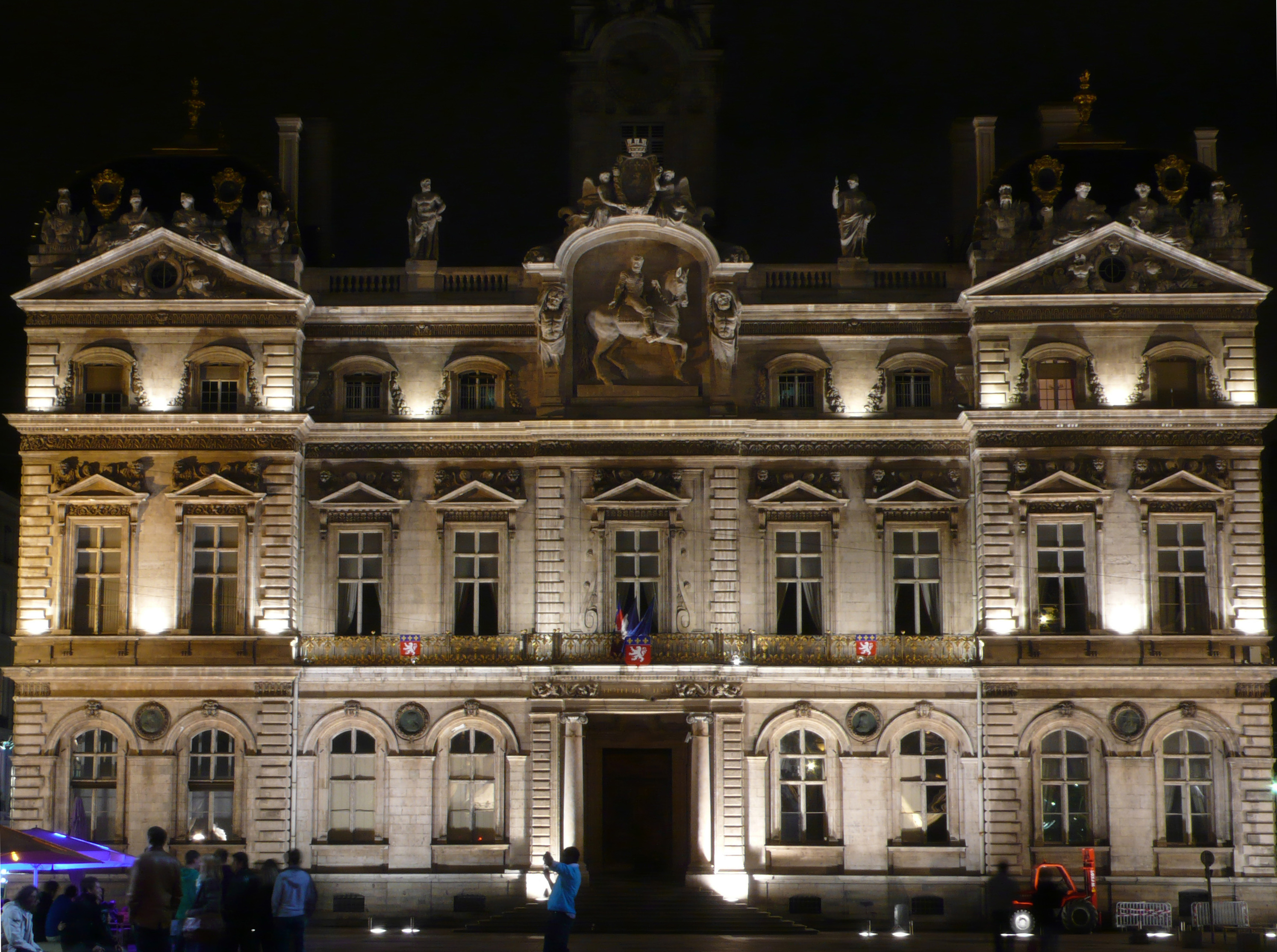
Illuminated facade, on the night

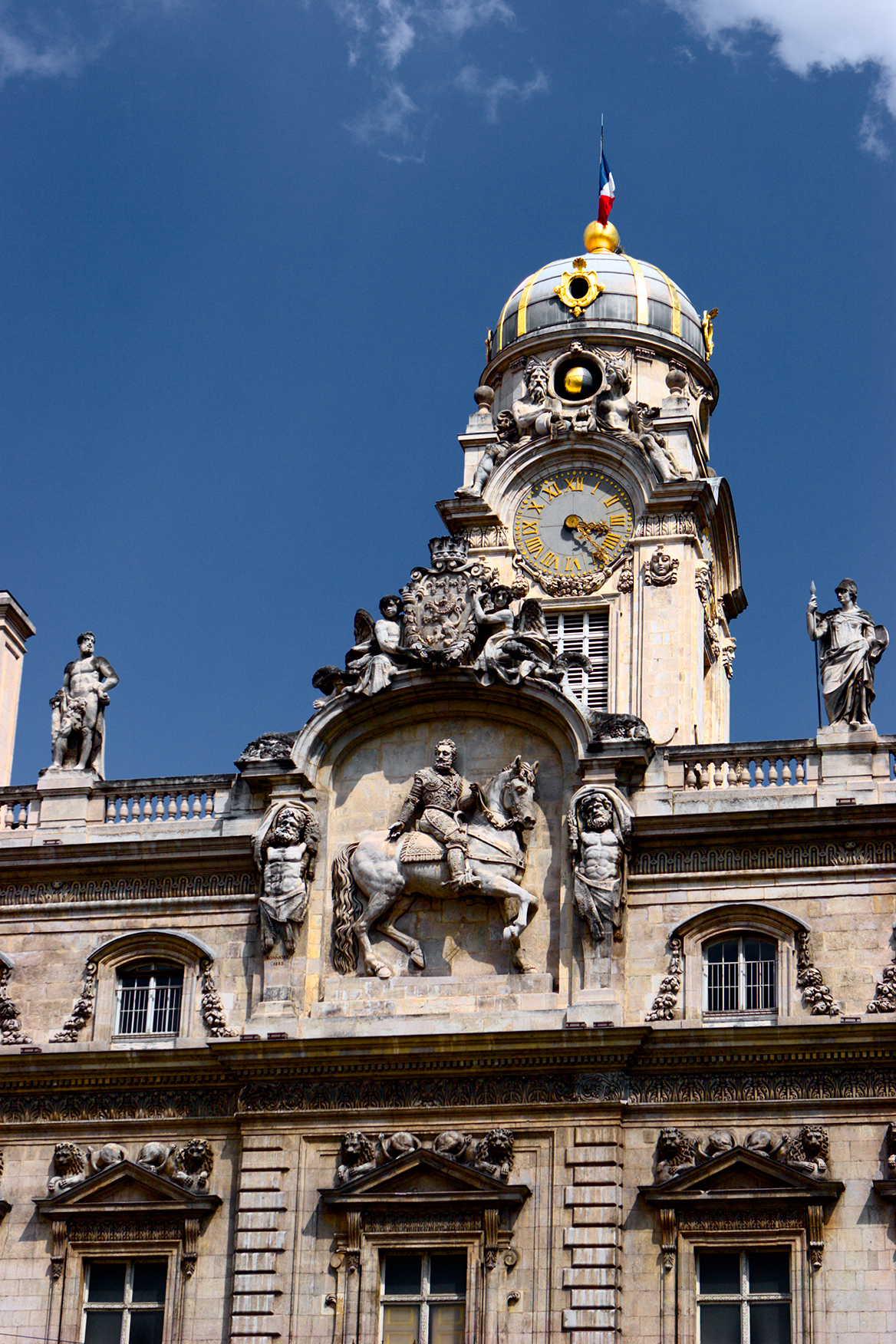
The City Hall, pediment and belfry

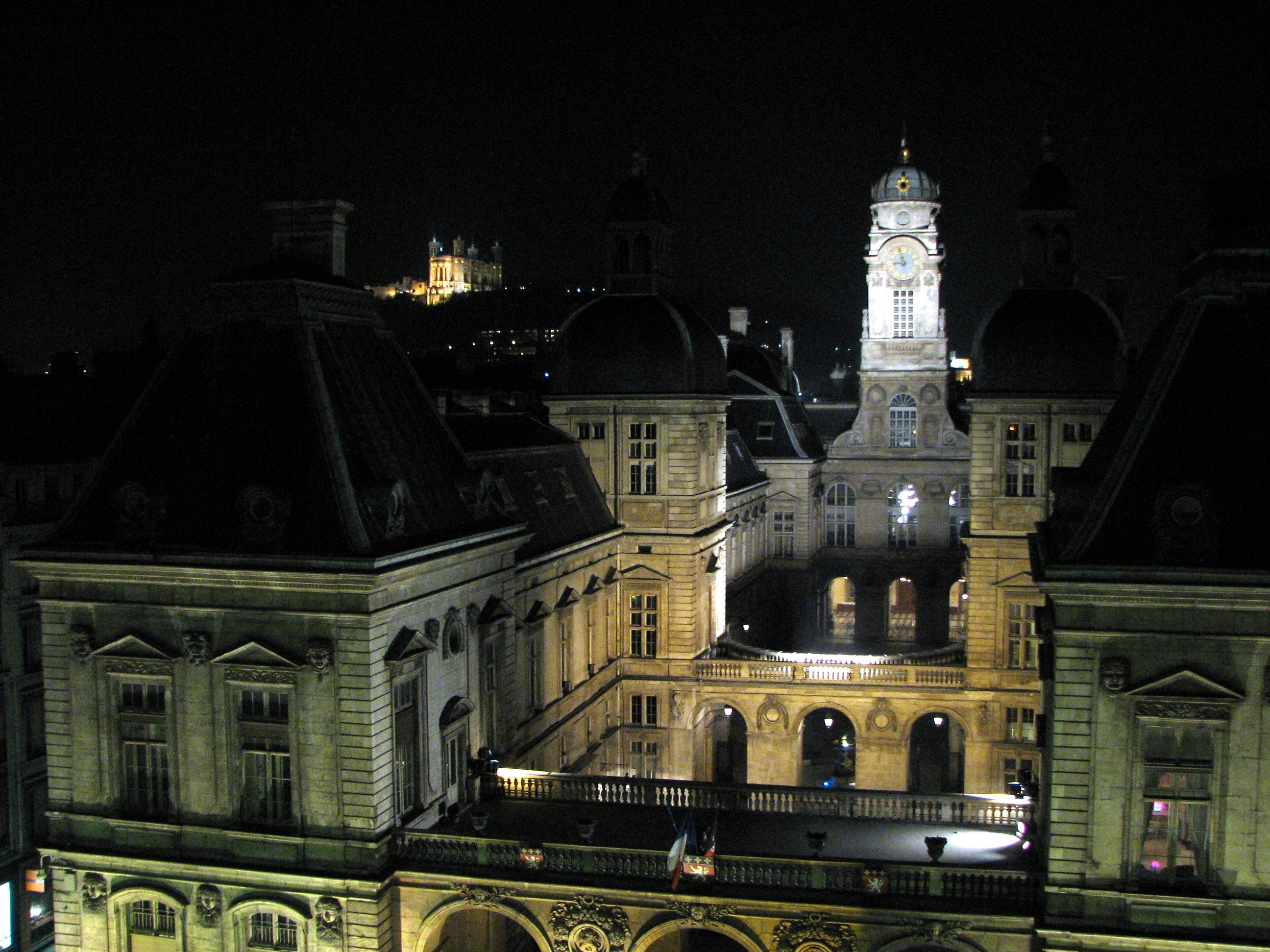
The court of honor
