= Fontaine Bartholdi =

Fountain in Lyon, France

Coordinates: 45°46′04″N 4°50′00″E

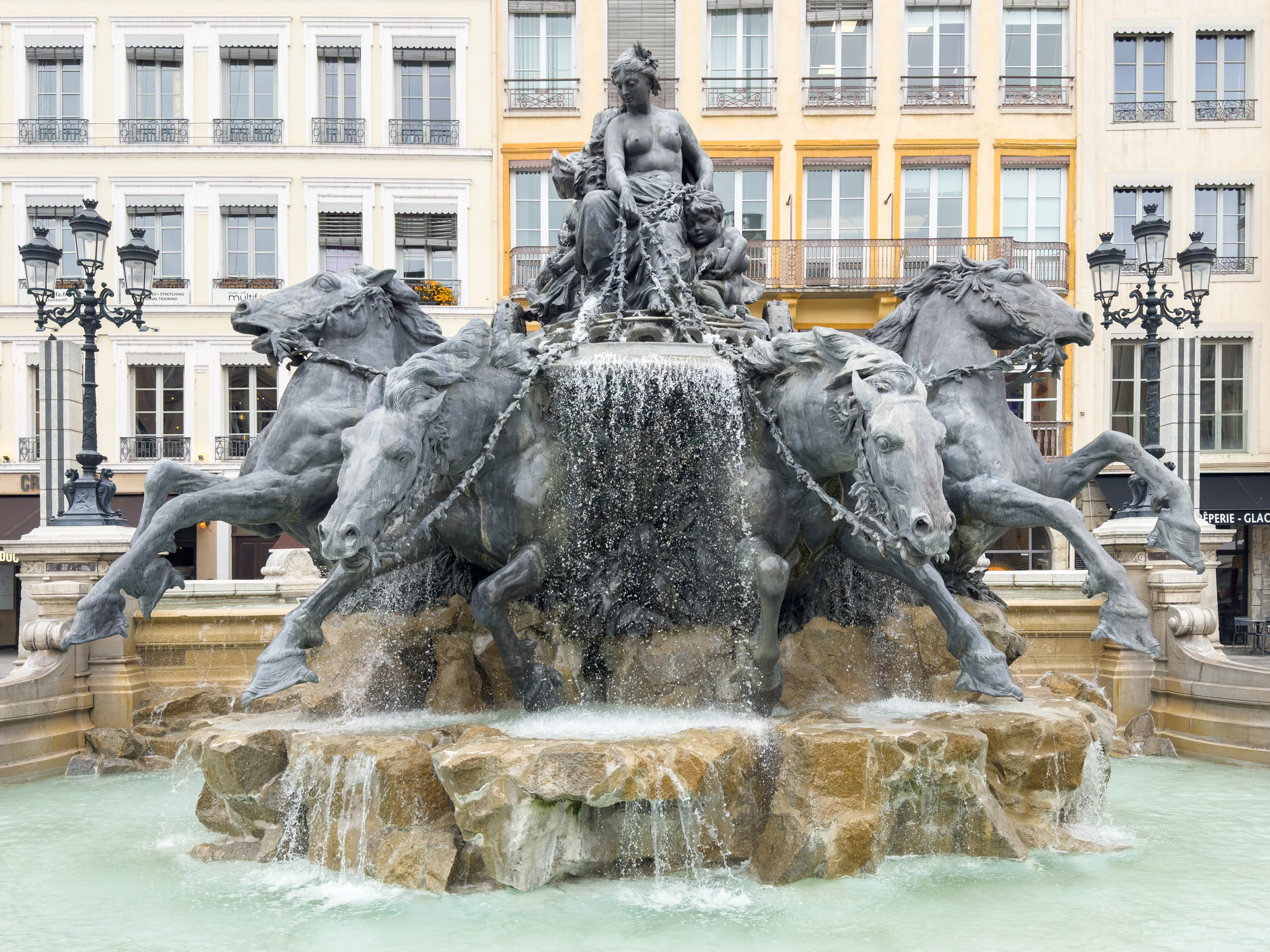
- Artist: Frédéric Auguste Bartholdi
- Completion date: 1892
- Medium: Lead
- Location: Lyon, France

The Fontaine Bartholdi (French pronunciation: [fɔ̃tɛn baʁtɔldi]) is a fountain sculpted by Frédéric Auguste Bartholdi and realised in 1889 by Gaget & Gautier. It was erected at the Place des Terreaux, in the 1st arrondissement of Lyon, in September 1892.

== History ==
On 20 April 1857, the Bordeaux city council decided to hold a competition to create a fountain for Place Quinconces. Frédéric Bartholdi, then aged 23, won the contest. However, the city hall of Bordeaux decided not to carry out his project. After Bartholdi had made the Statue of Liberty in New York in 1886, the mayor of Bordeaux contacted him, but his new project was canceled after much hesitation. It was finally achieved in 1888, but it was deemed as too expensive and therefore was sold to Lyon. It was unveiled as part of the Exposition Universelle (1889). The fountain was eventually put at the Place des Terreaux and is currently still there.

The fountain depicts France as a female (Marianne) seated on a chariot controlling the four great rivers of France, represented by wildly rearing and plunging horses, highly individualized but symmetrically arranged, with bridles and reins of water weeds. The fountain weighs 21 tons and is made of lead supported by a frame of iron and was presented at the Exposition Universelle of 1889. It has been classified as monument historique since 29 September 1995.

1892: First inauguration on Place des Terreaux

1995: "Historic monument" classification after its relocation opposite the Fine Arts Museum

June 2016: start of the restoration work

March 2018: inauguration of the restored, re-watered and lit fountain

Total budget for the restoration: 3.58 million euros (including a one million euro contribution from the State)

== Restoration ==
The fountain was removed temporarily in 2015 for restoration and was returned in December 2017, for a total budget of 2 750 000 euros. The structure was rusted, and the lead statue warped and fractured.

== Gallery ==
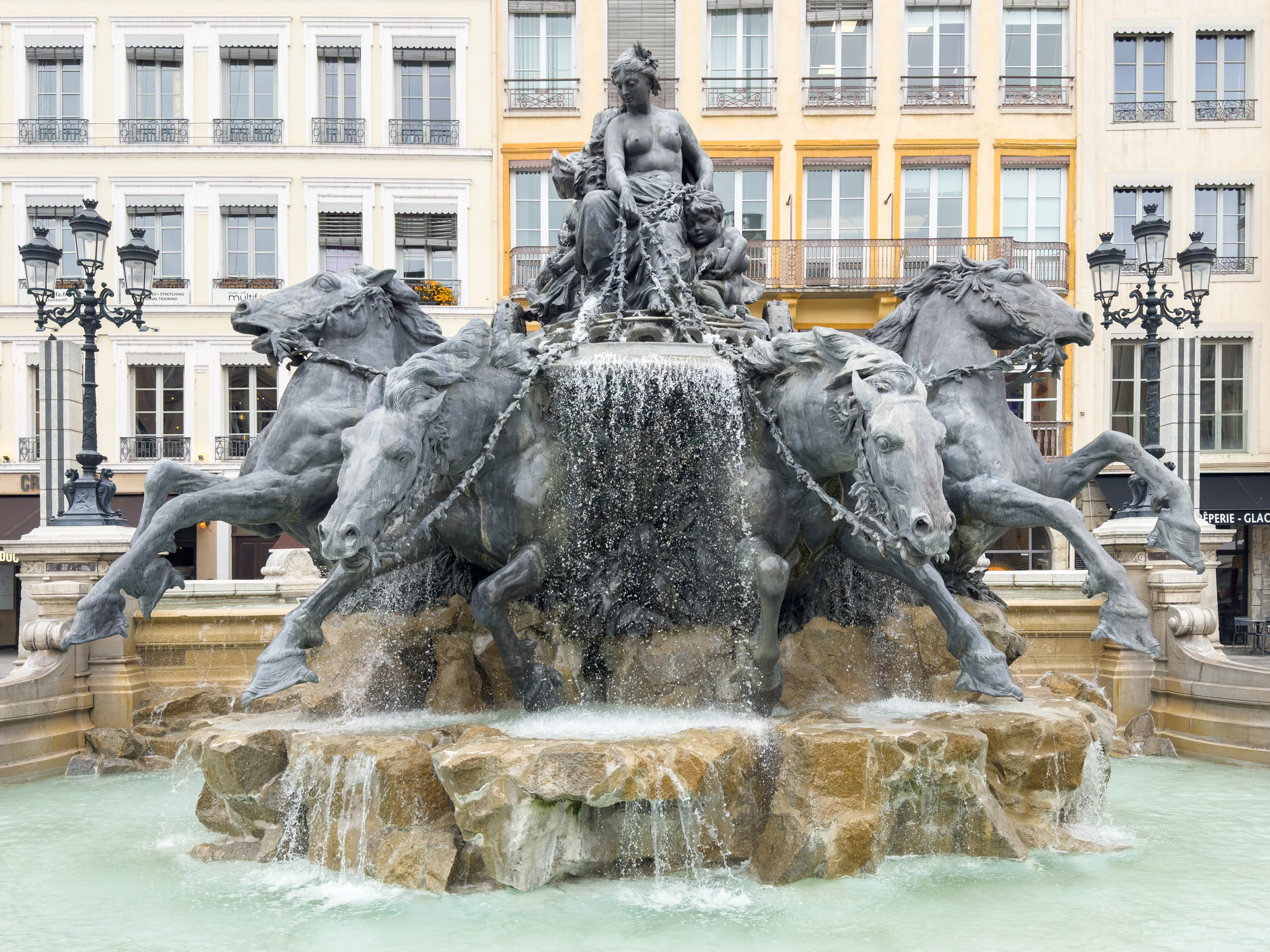
After 2017 restoration

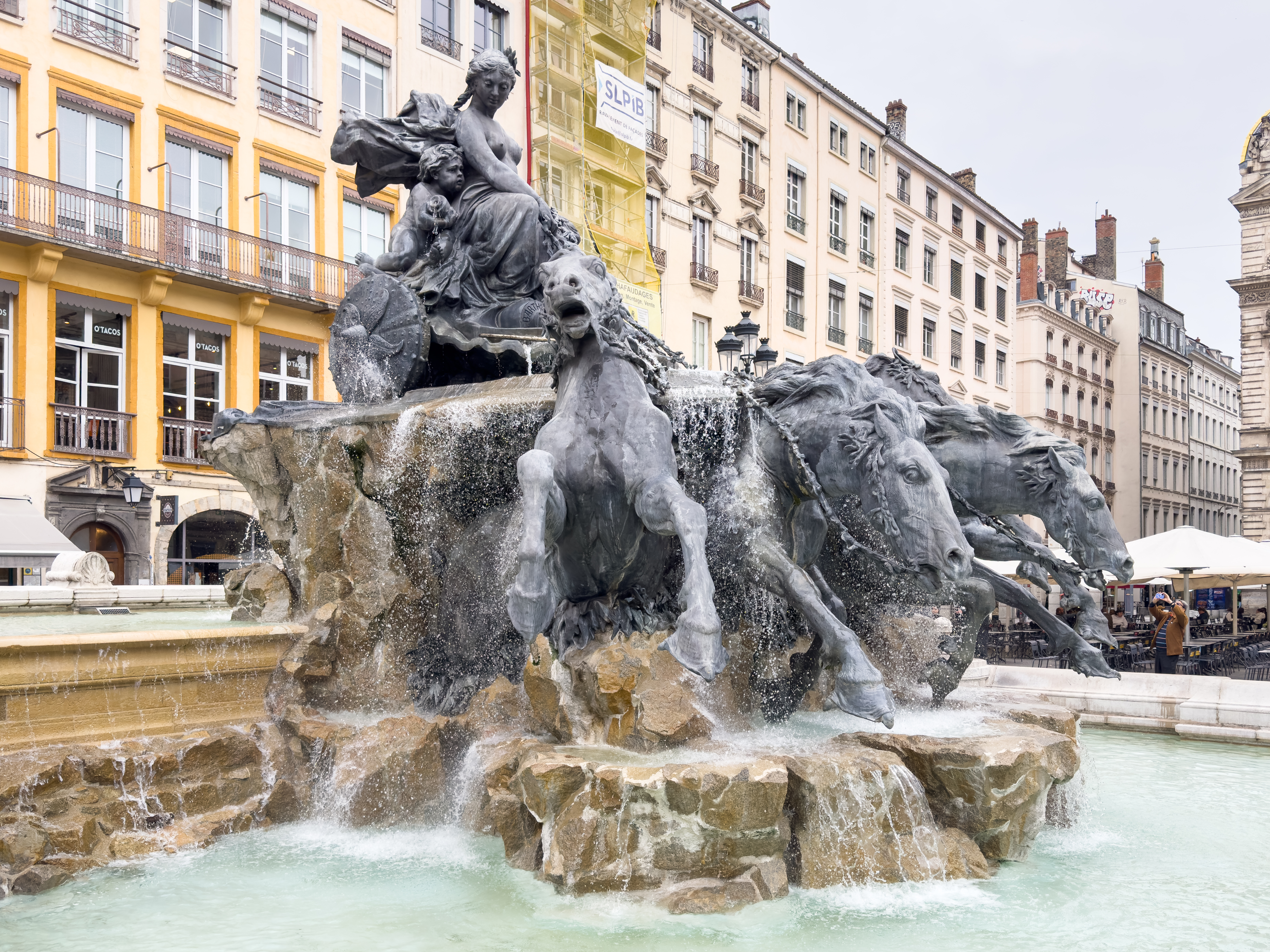

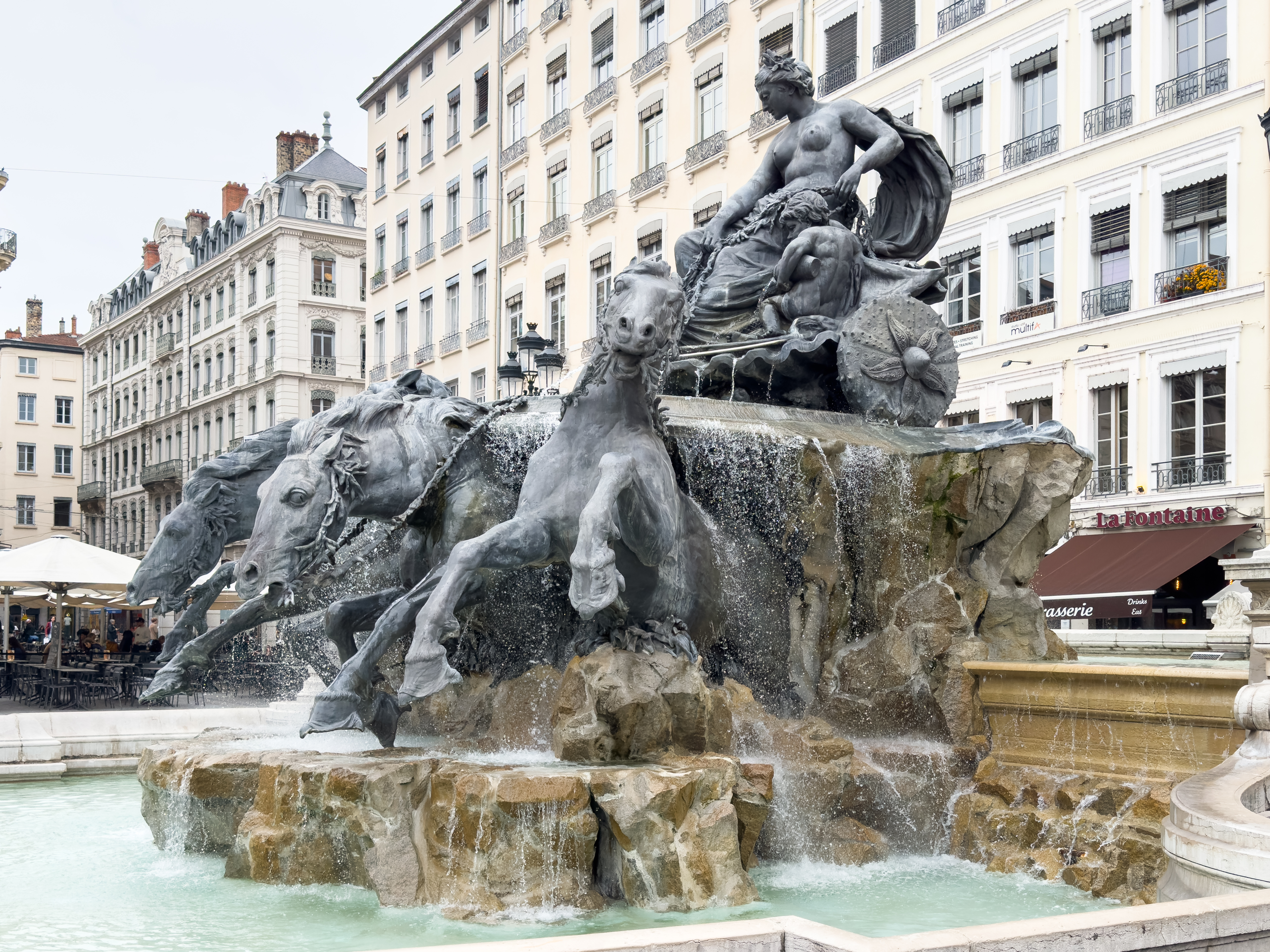

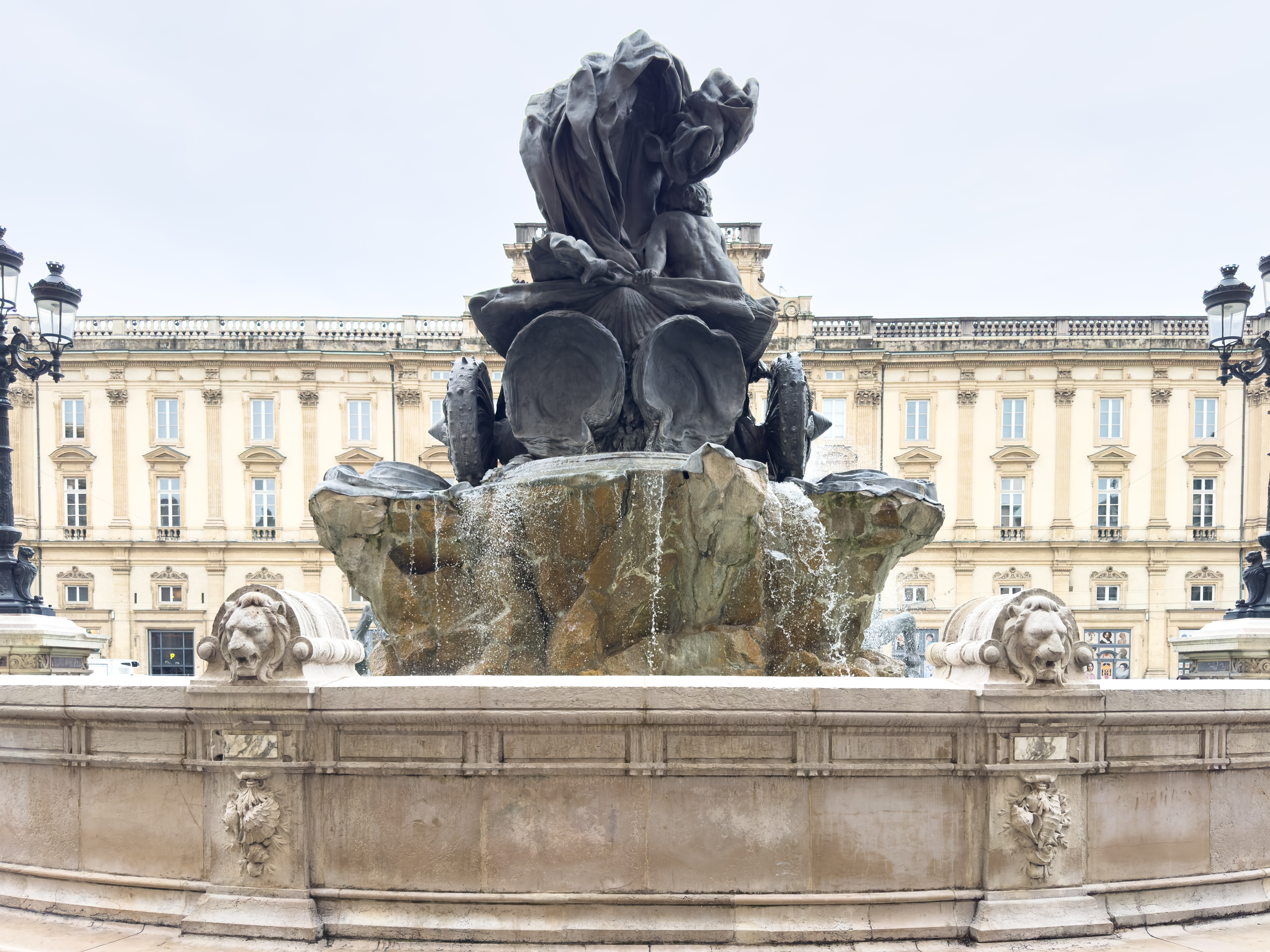

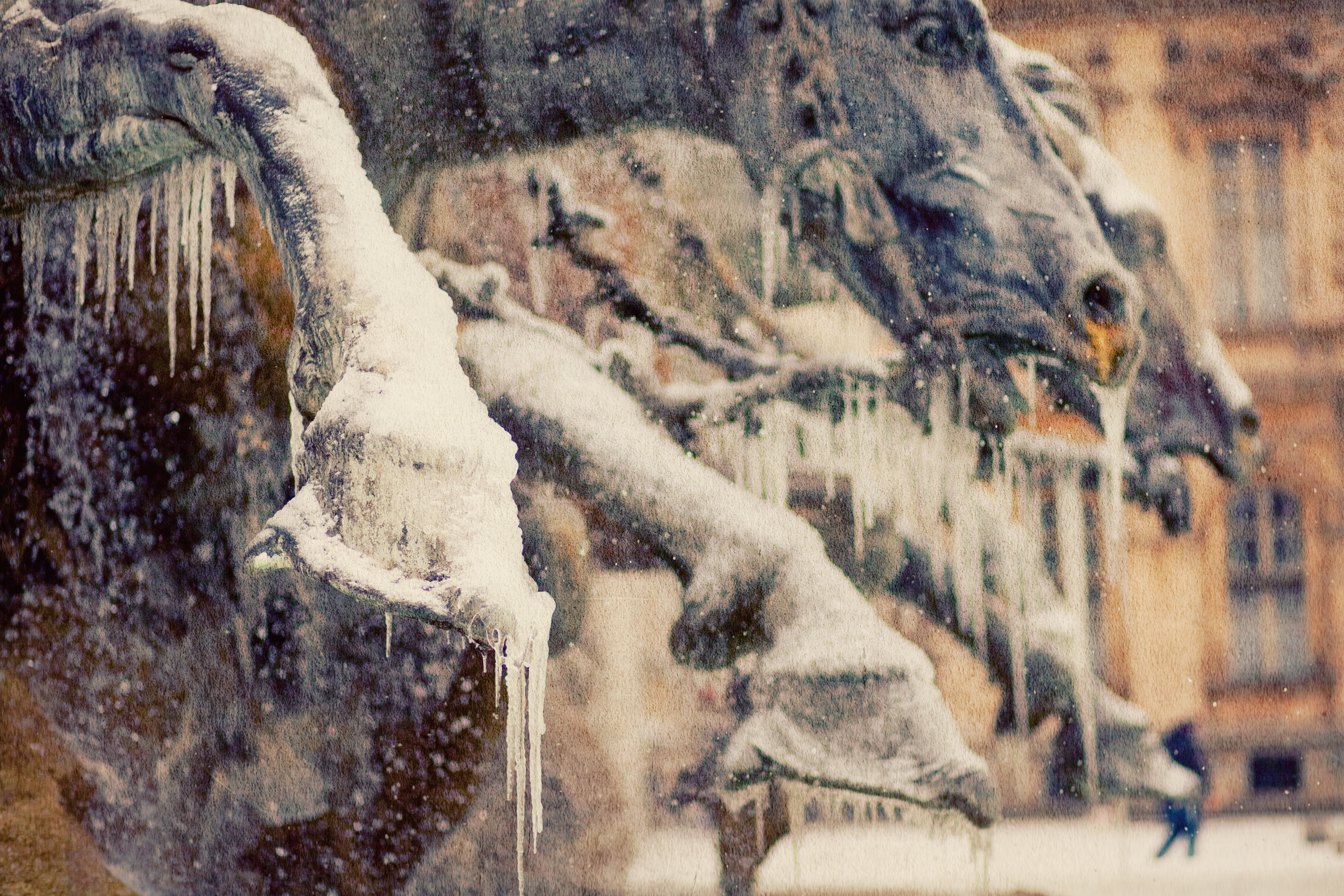

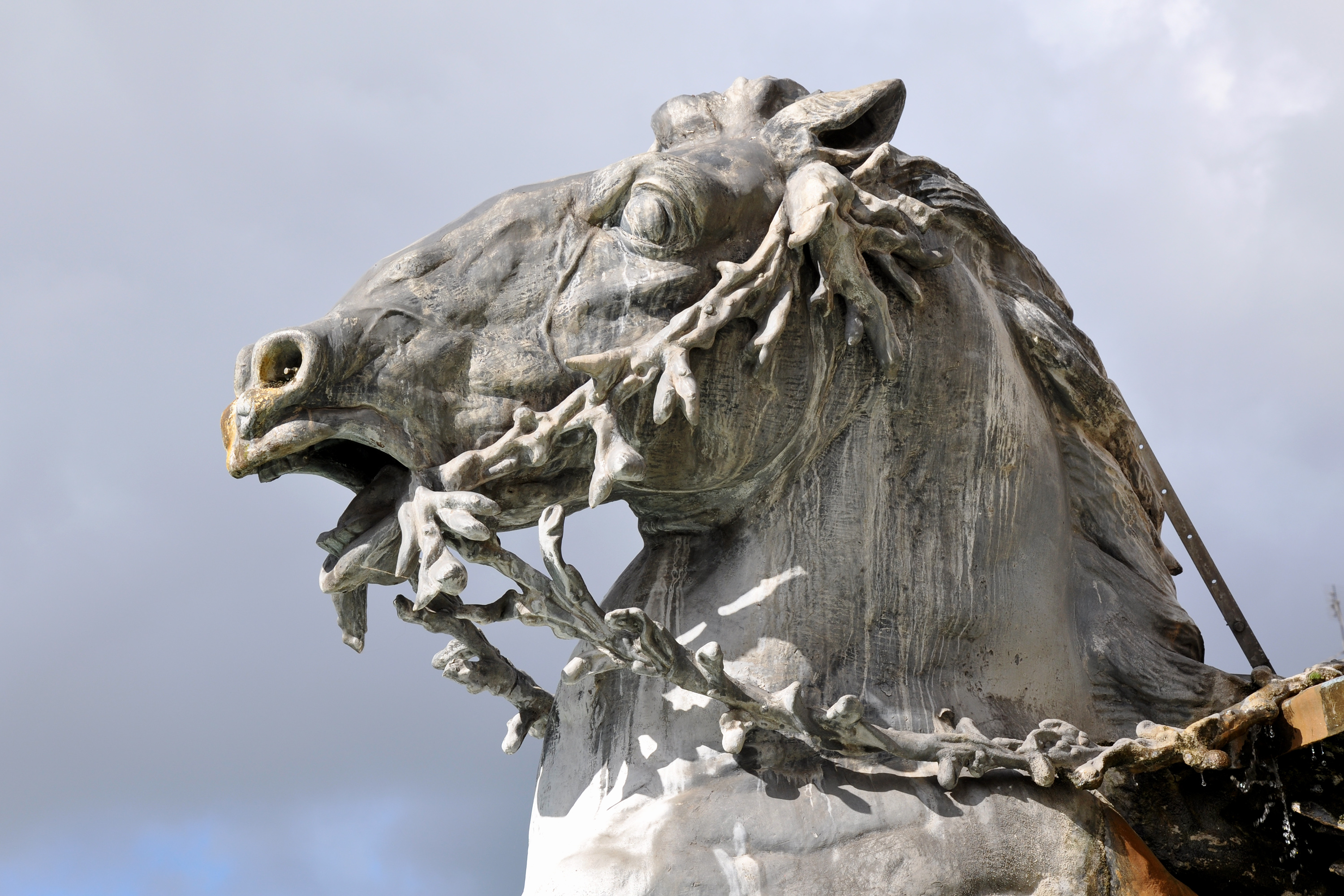

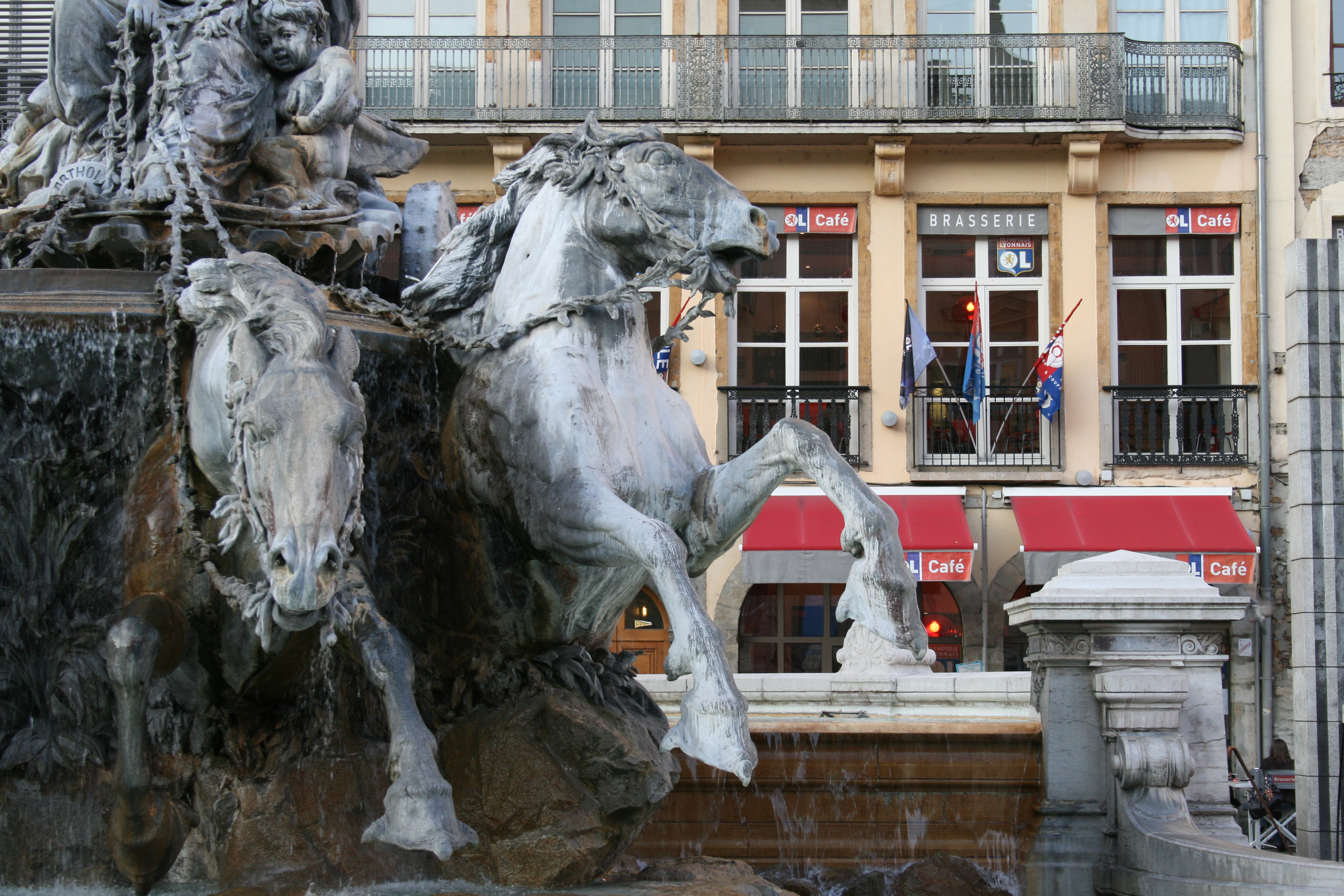

== See also ==
- List of tallest statues
