= Simon Maupin =

French architect

Simon Maupin (French pronunciation: [simɔ̃ mopɛ̃]; before 1625 in Longueau - 10 October 1668 in Lyon) was a French architect.

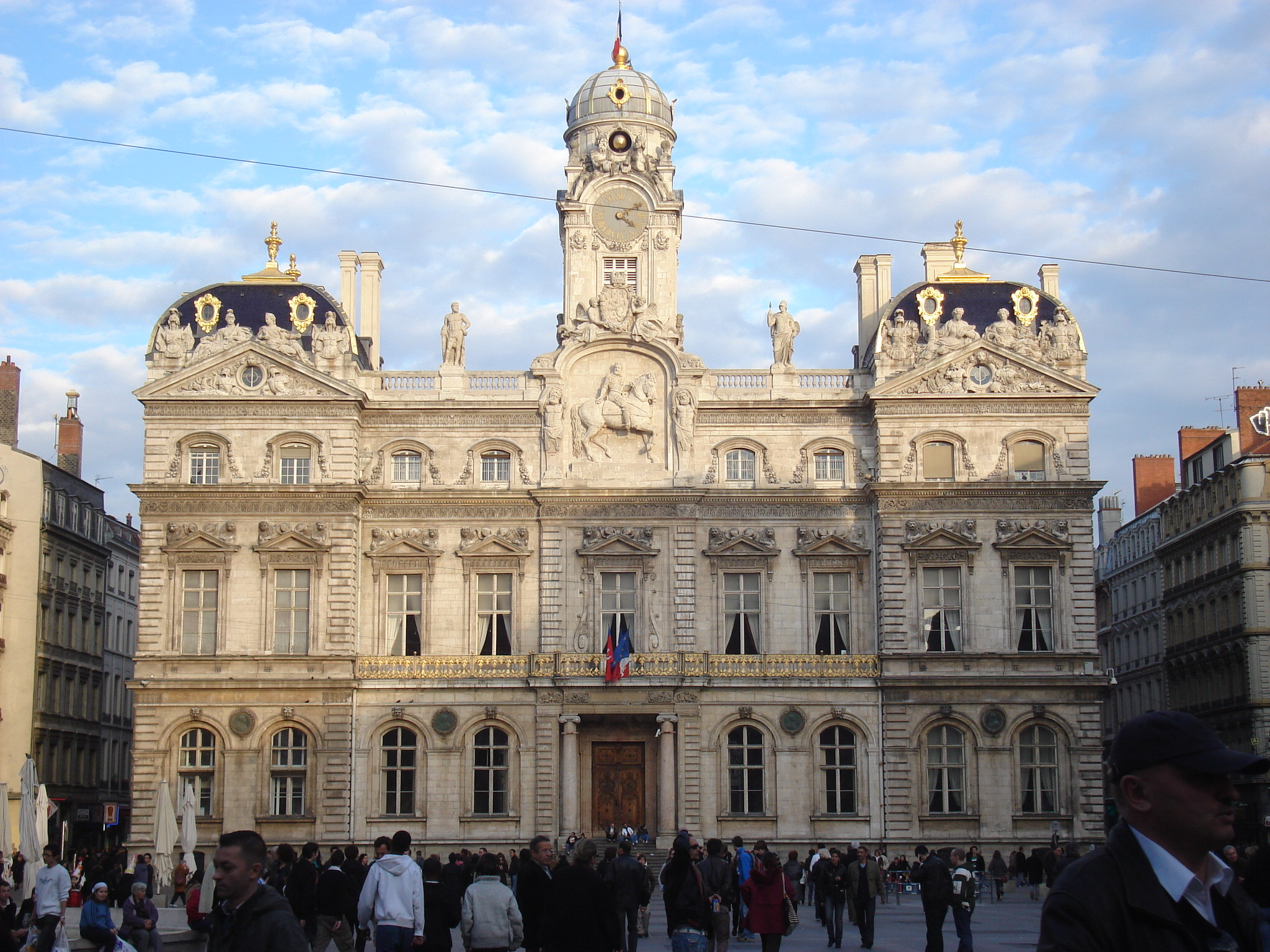
The Hôtel de Ville de Lyon, designed by Simon Maupin.

== Biography ==
In 1625, he engraved his Plan de Lyon.

He became famous when he drew up the plans of the Hôtel de Ville de Lyon, built between 1646 and 1651. It was presumed that he only executed a project made by Girard Desargues, but it seems he took his orders from the consular advice.

In 1654, he drew up the plans of work to be done to restore the old dam built along the left bank of the Rhône, near the Parc de la Tête d'Or. In 1659, he was appointed intendant of dikes and works done on the Rhone.

In 1659, his plan of Lyon entitled Description au naturel de la ville de Lyon et païsages alentour d'icelle was published.

In 1661, for unknown reasons, he resigned from his post as road inspector and died seven years later, in Lyon.
