= Basilica of Our Lady of Geneva =

Church in Switzerland

Coordinates: 46°12′31″N 6°8′31″E

- Basilique Notre-Dame de Genève; Basilika Unserer Lieben Frau von Genf
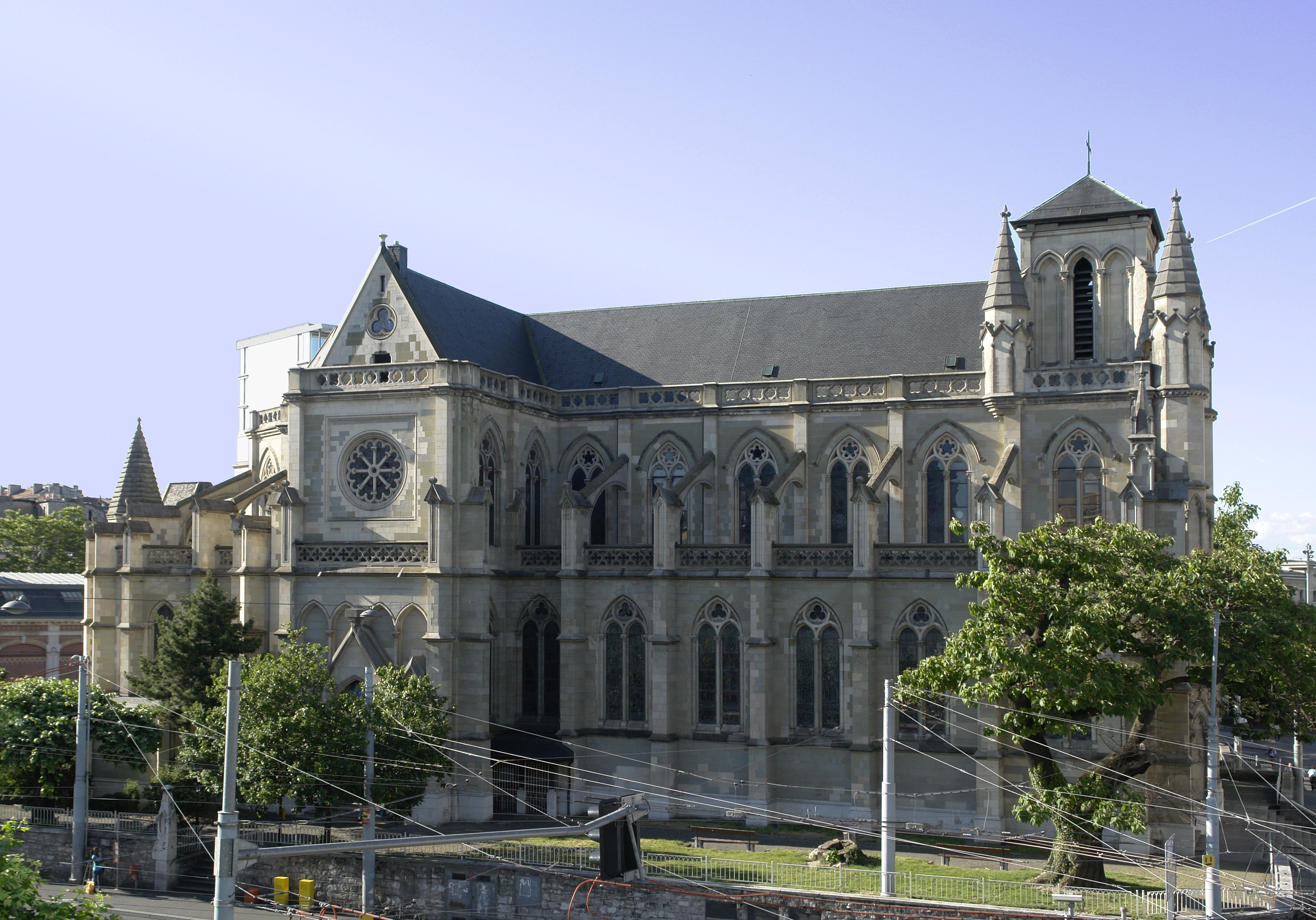
- Basilica of Our Lady of Geneva

- Location of Our Lady of Geneva in Switzerland
- Country: Switzerland
- Denomination: Roman Catholic
- Website: Basilica of Our Lady of Geneva

History
- Status: Minor Basilica
- Founded: 1852-1857

Architecture
- Functional status: Active
- Heritage designation: Swiss Inventory of Cultural Property of National and Regional Significance
- Style: Gothic

Administration
- Diocese: Roman Catholic Diocese of Geneva

The Basilica of Our Lady of Geneva (French: Basilique Notre-Dame de Genève) is a Roman Catholic church and Minor Basilica located in Geneva, Switzerland. It is dedicated to the Blessed Virgin Mary.

The shrine is a common stopover for pilgrims going to Santiago de Compostela. The basilica marks the beginning of the "via Gebennensis", which extends from Le Puy-en-Velay in via Podiensis.

== History ==
The church was built according to the design of Alexandre Grigny of Arras between 1852 and 1857 on the site of a former stronghold fortifications. This neo-Gothic building, whose appearance is partly inspired by Notre-Dame de Bonsecours and Saint-Nicolas of Nantes, broke ground thanks to the city of Geneva, which had ceded land to religious communities to build places of worship, and through donations and manual labor provided by the Geneva Catholics. The cornerstone was laid on 8 September 1852. Pope Pius IX donated 1,000 crowns towards the construction

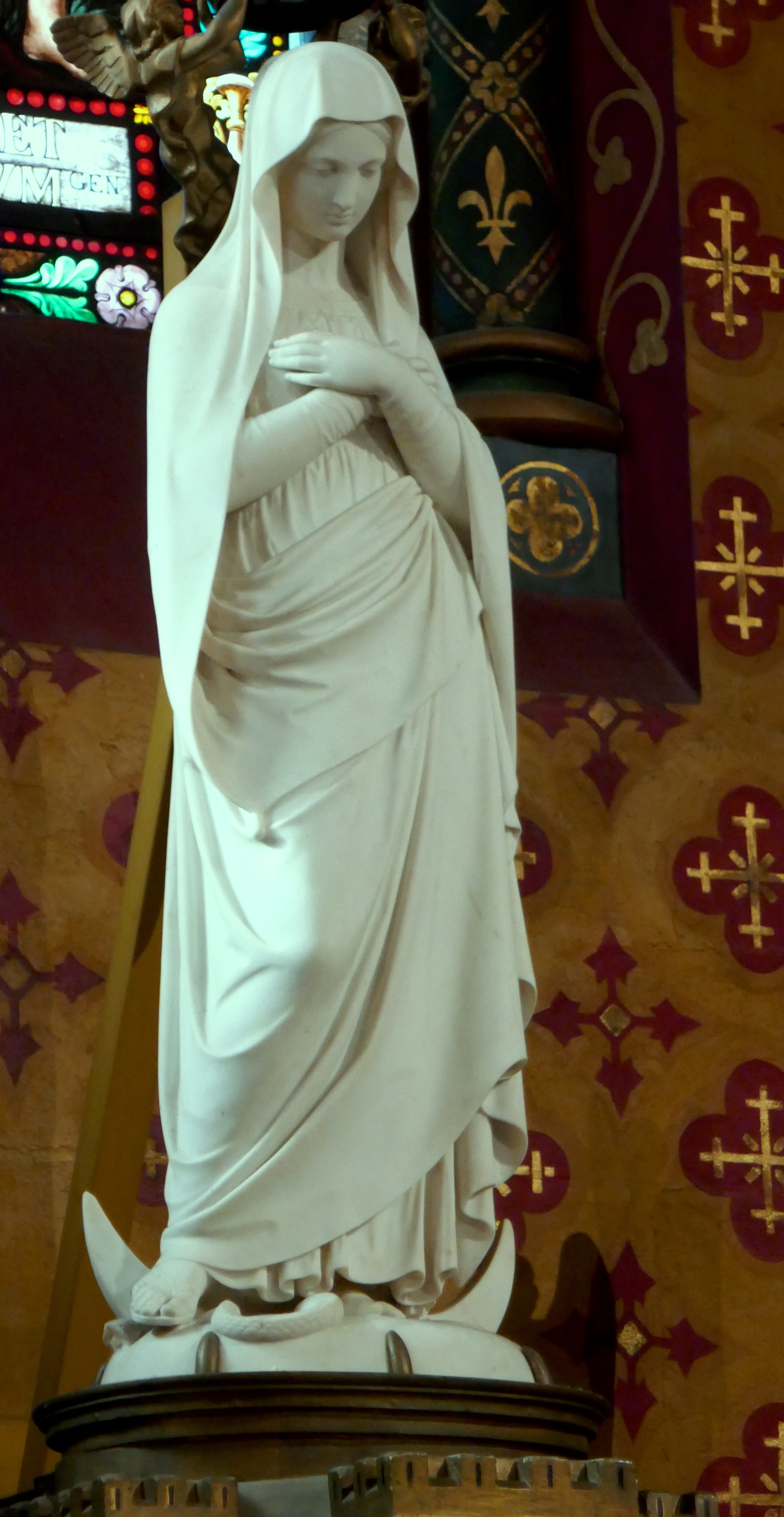
The venerated Marian image crowned by the Pontifical decree of Pope Pius XI on 26 April 1936. By the Roman sculptor, Carlo Maria Forzani.

The dedication was celebrated 4 October 1857. Father Gaspard Mermillod, future episcopal vicar of Geneva pronounced the sermon. He was later expelled from Switzerland by the government.

After the coming to power of an anti-clerical government, Notre Dame was occupied on 5 June 1875, and closed. This occupation was accompanied by a protest against the Roman Catholic Church and more unrest. The commitment of Catholics to this sanctuary became even greater. The building was bought by the Catholic Church in 1911.

To accommodate the American pilgrims, the 7:00 p.m. Catholic Mass and recitation of the Holy Rosary on Sundays is in the English language.

== Pontifical approbations ==
- Pope Pius IX — gifted the white Carrara marble statue of the Immaculate Conception from his own private chapel inside the Apostolic Palace. The statue was named "Our Lady of Geneva" and gifted it to the former Bishop of Lausanne and Geneva, Cardinal Gaspard Mermillod on 20 November 1859 during a private Papal audience. The image was sculpted by Roman artisan Carlo Maria Forzani (purported to be under the apprenticeship of his Master, Pietro Tenerani) and was installed in the church on 28 December 1859, then officially consecrated to the shrine on 5 February 1860. The Marian statue previously had a mandorla of solar rays adorned with twelve six—pointed stars.
- Pope Pius XI — granted the image a decree of Pontifical coronation on 26 April 1936 to the former Bishop of Lausanne and Geneva, Marius Besson. The rite of coronation was executed by the Apostolic Nuncio, Filippo Bernardini on 23 May 1937.
- Pope Pius XII — issued a decree Nominis Catholici Urbe which raised the shrine to the status of minor basilica on 4 August 1954.

== Heritage ==
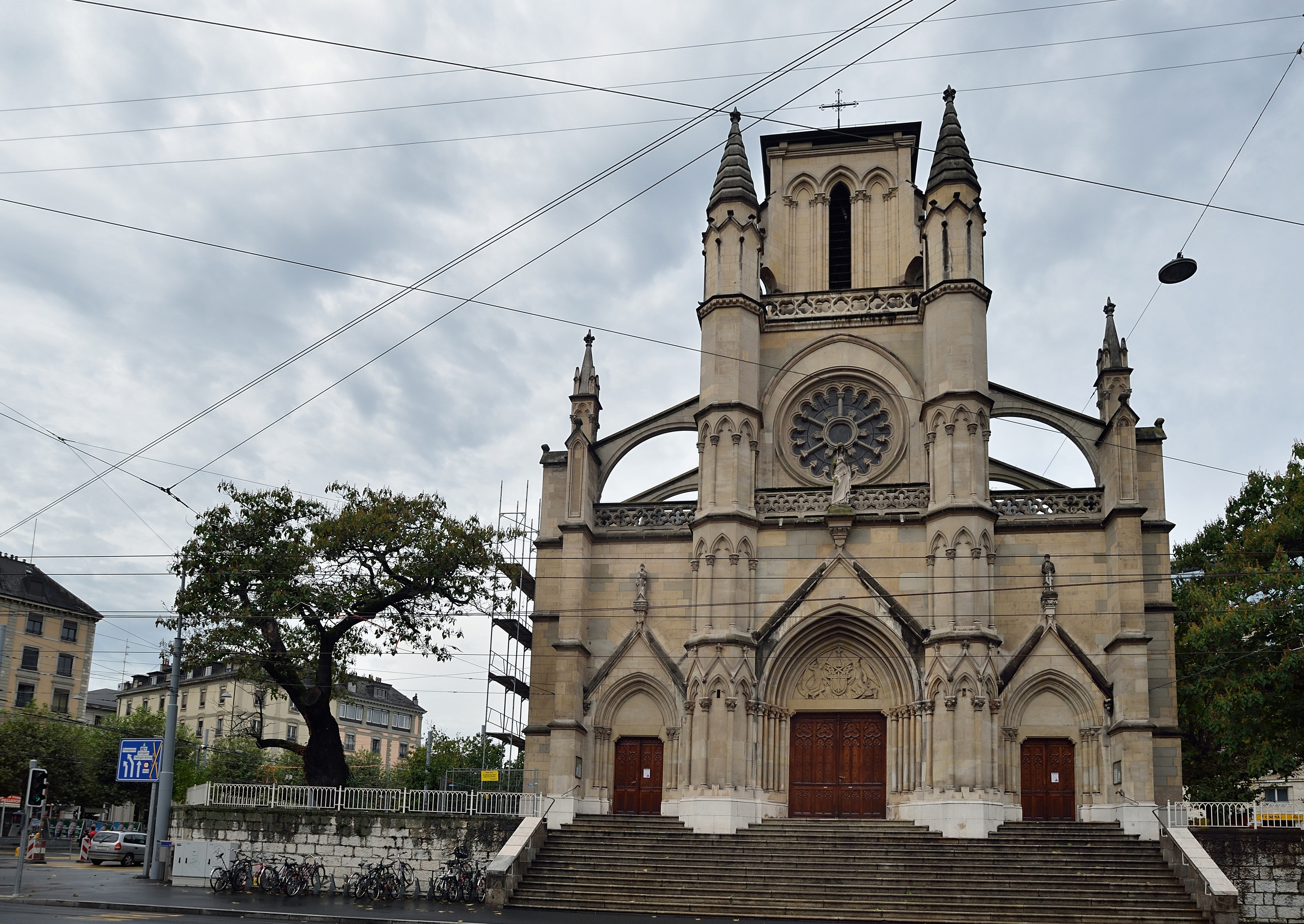
Facade of Notre-Dame basilica

The stained glass windows of the basilica are particularly remarkable. Some are semi-industrial production neo-Gothic, but most show the evolution of the art of stained glass during the twentieth century, in various styles, after those of Claudius Lavergne (installed from 1857 to 1875).

From 1912, several artists have successively contributed to adorn the basilica: Charles Brunner, Alexandre Cingria, Maurice Denis, Gherri Moro, Paul Monnier, Jean-Claude Morend, Théodore Strawinsky. The building is classified as part of the Swiss Inventory of Cultural Property of National and Regional Significance.

== Stained glass windows ==
The first stained glass windows, by Claudius Lavergne, were installed from 1857 to 1875, in the so-called Sulpician style. These are the 13 stained glass windows in the apse chapels and the ambulatory and the 3 rose windows.

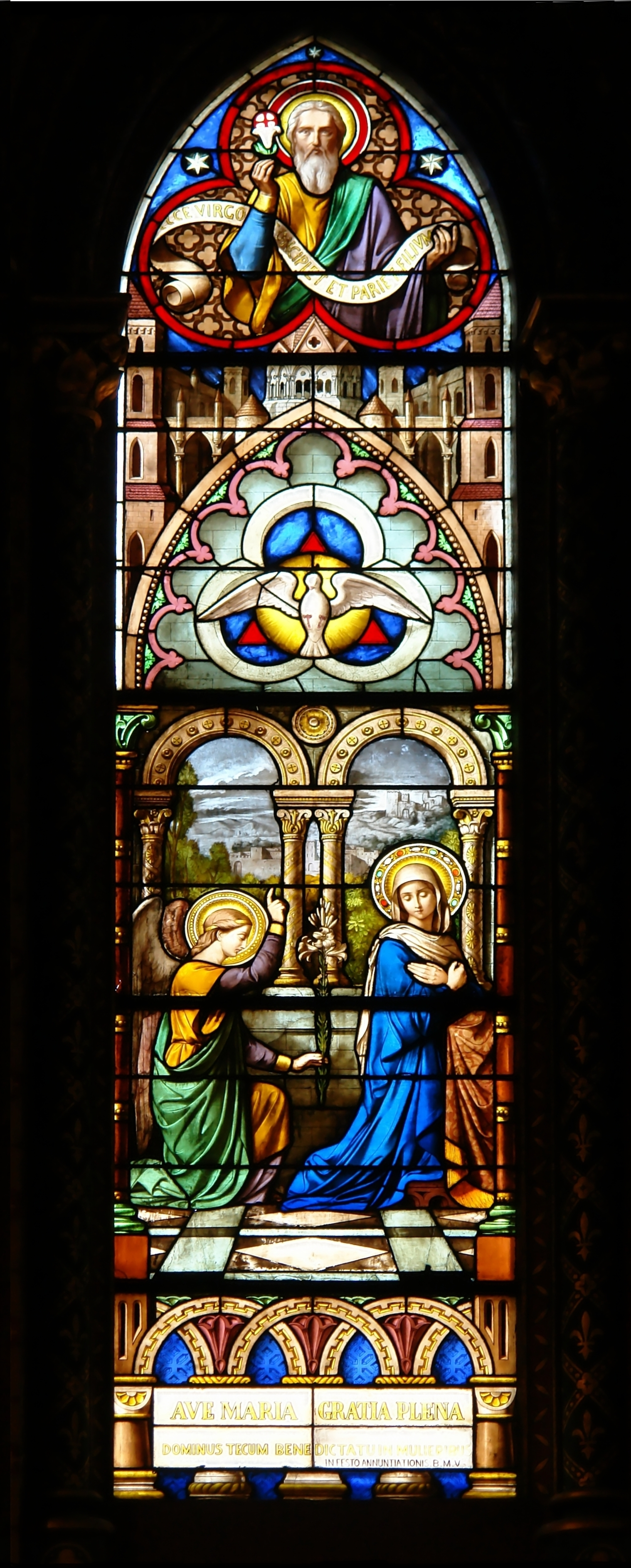
Top: God the Father; middle: Dove of Holy Spirit in trefoil; lower: Annunciation scene.

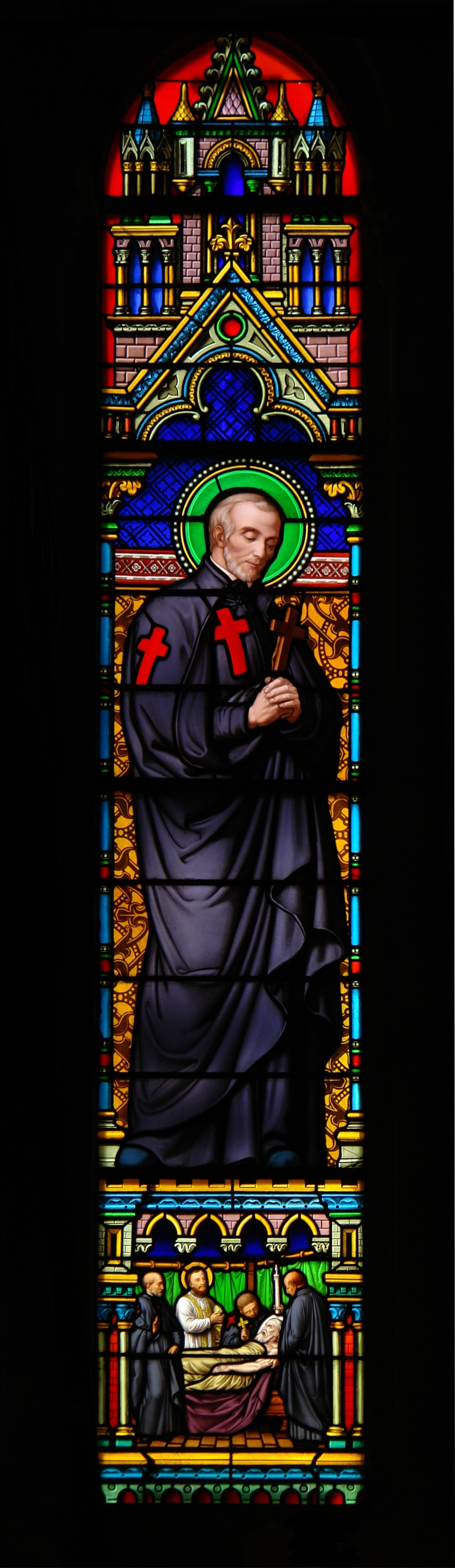

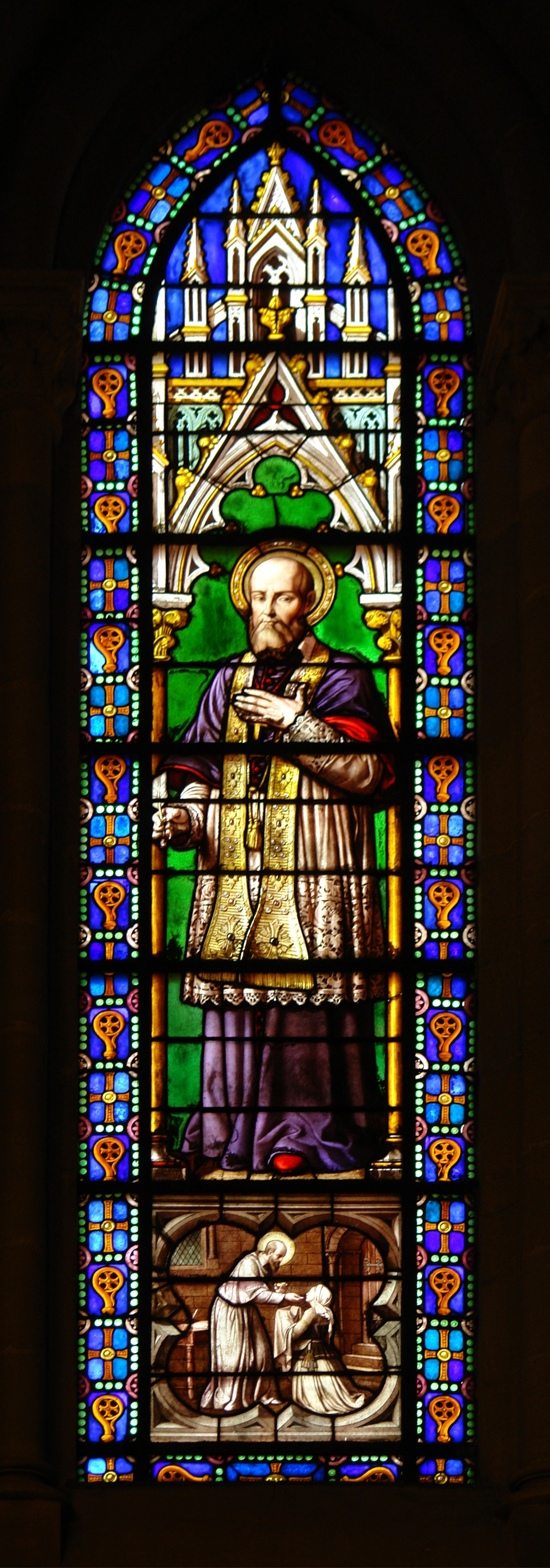

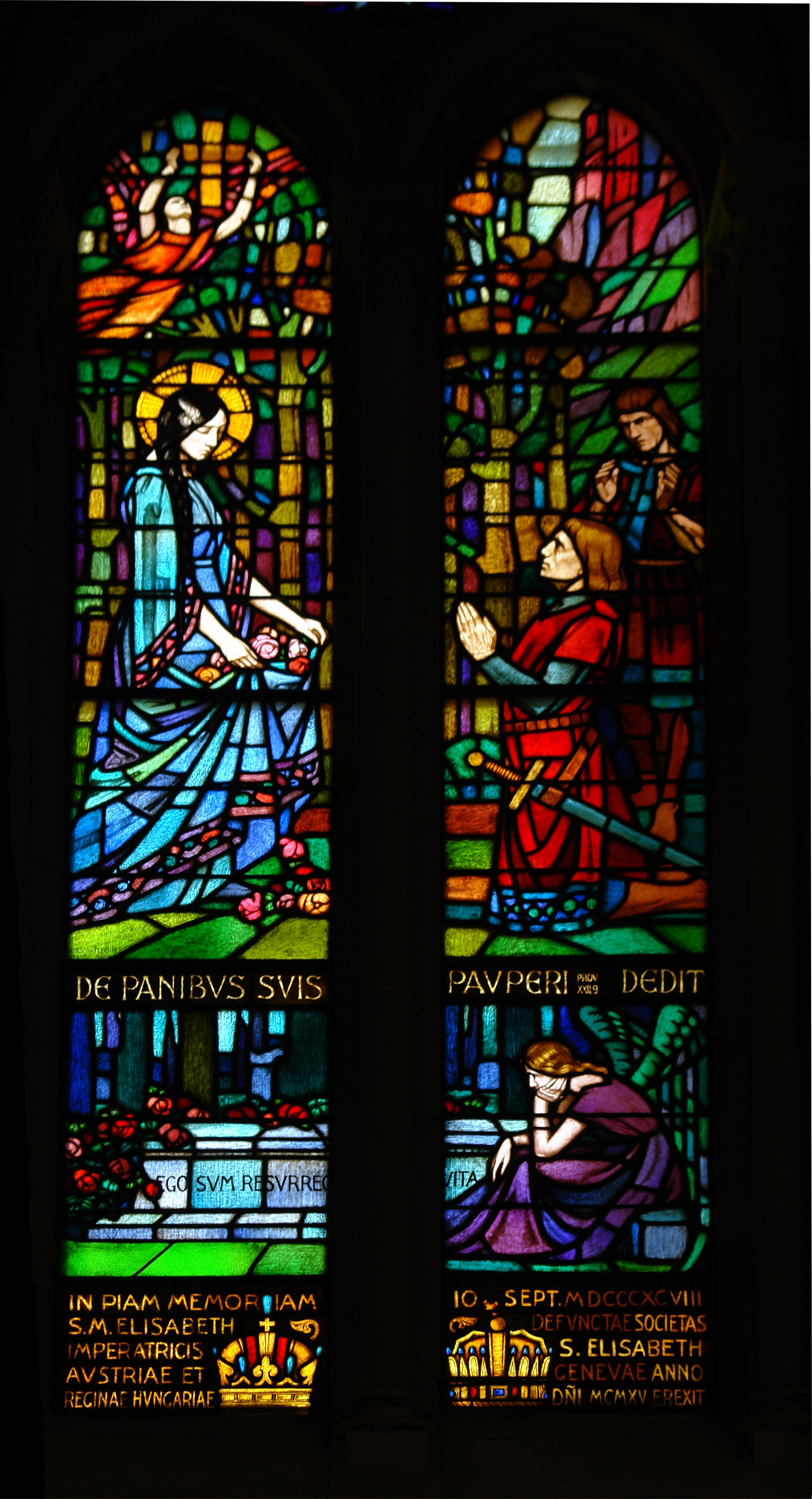

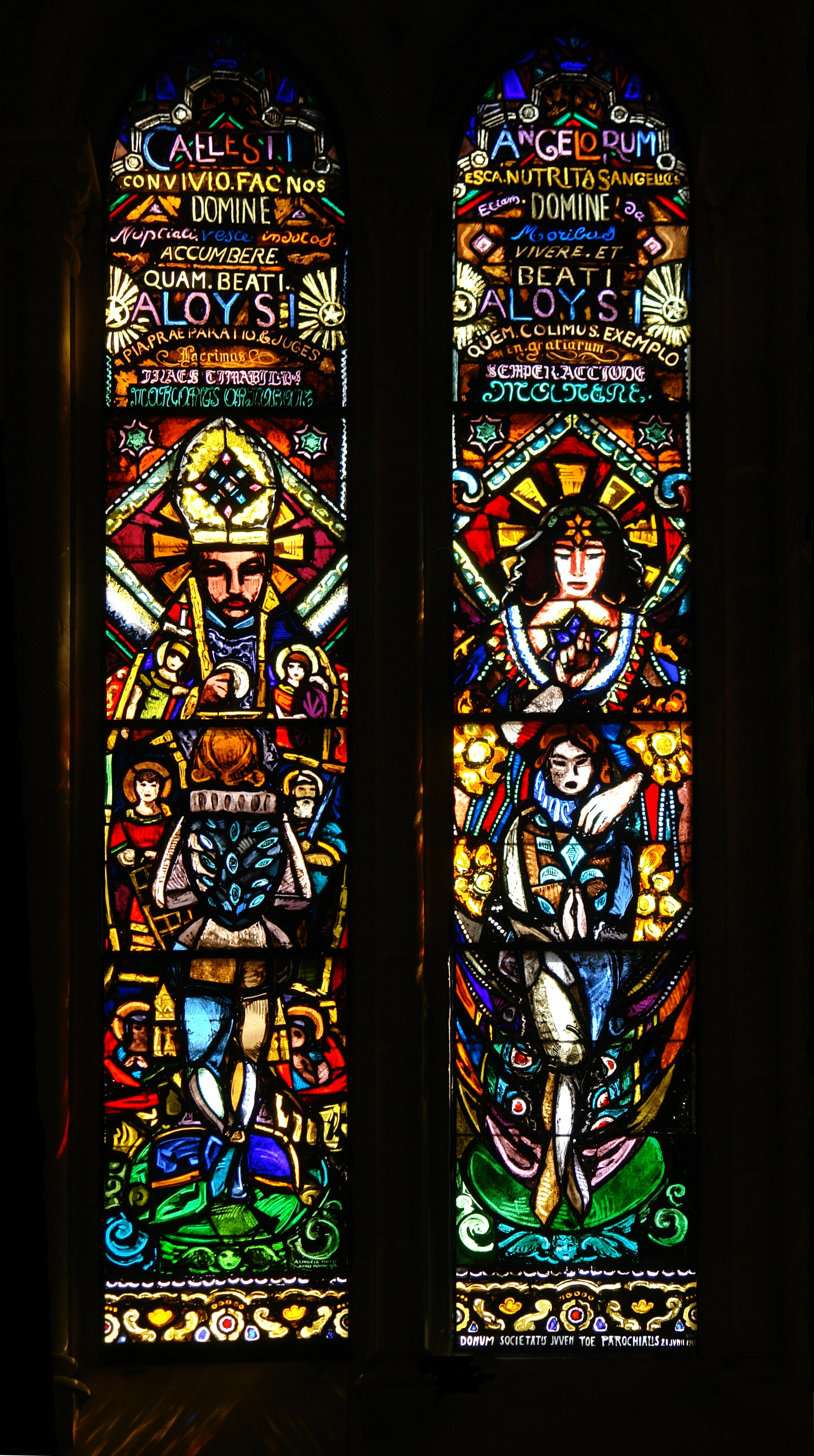

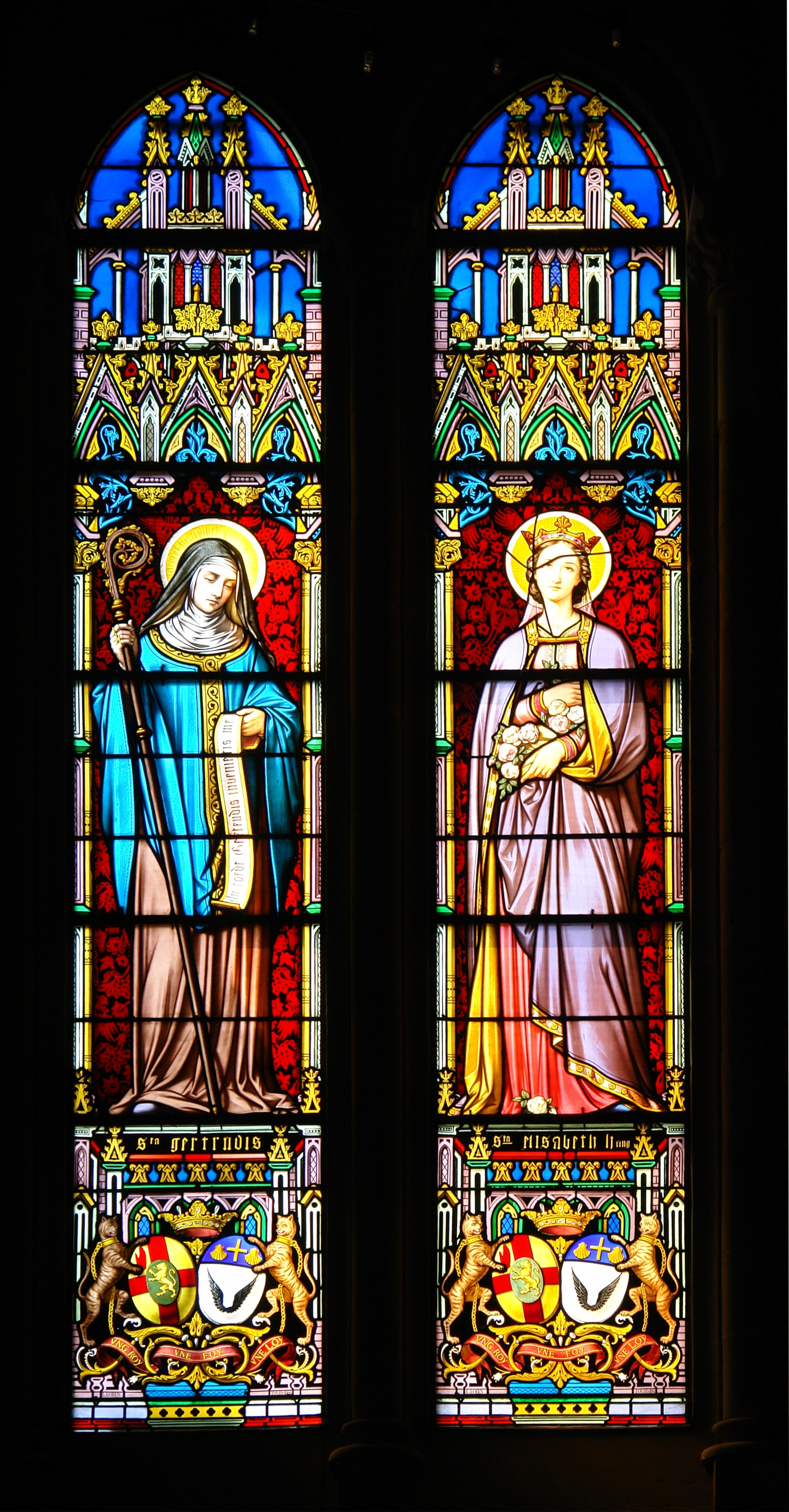

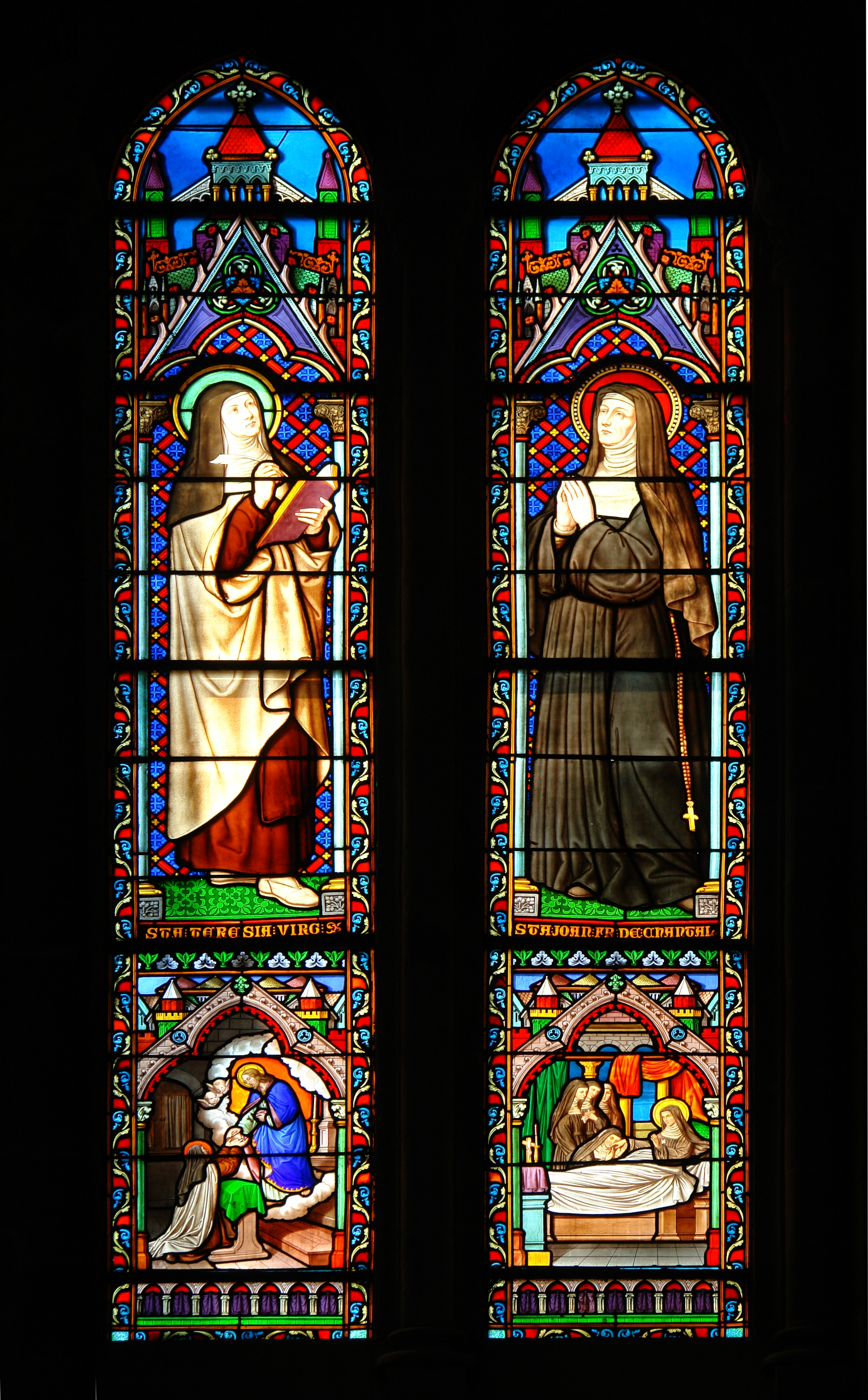

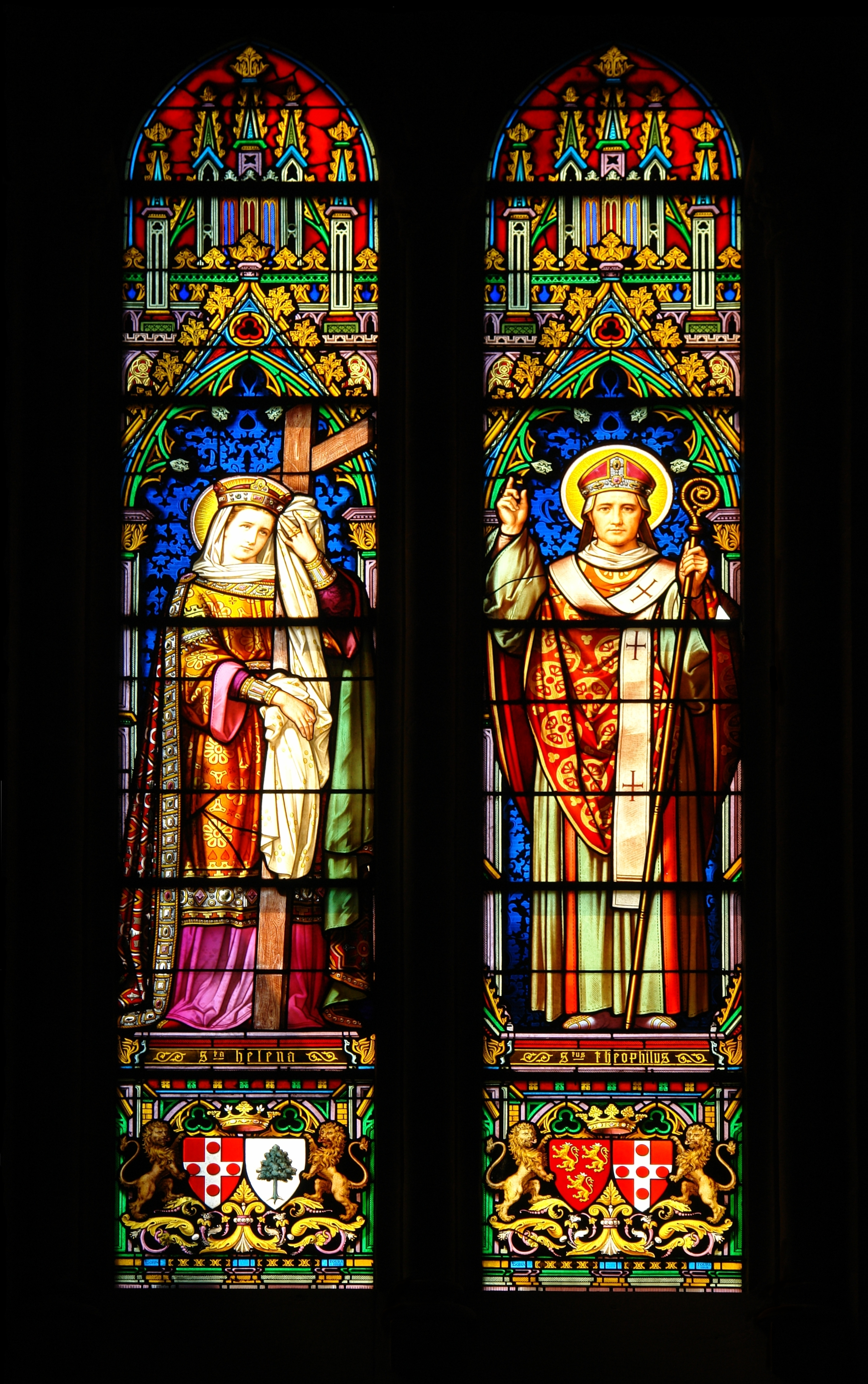

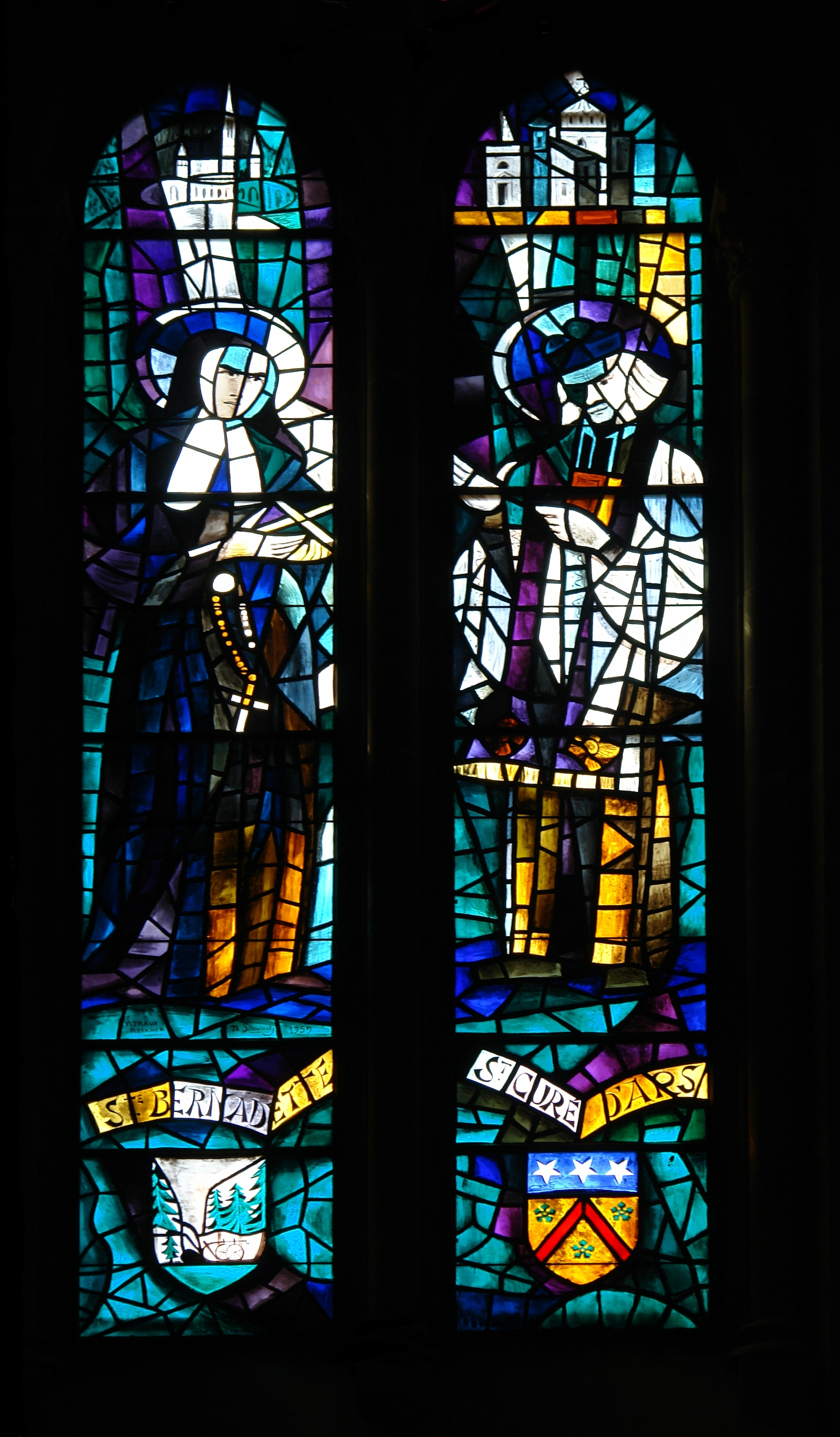

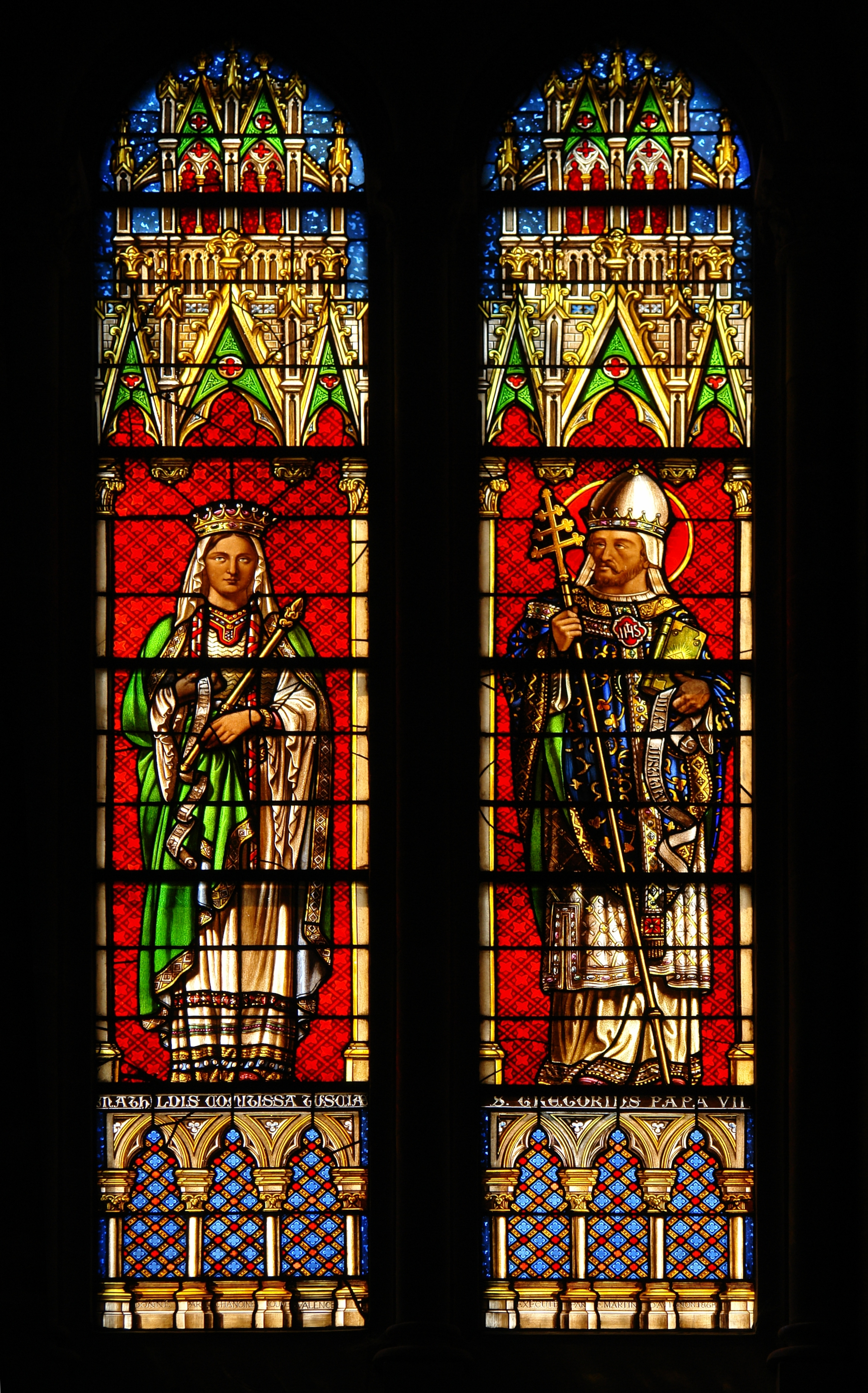

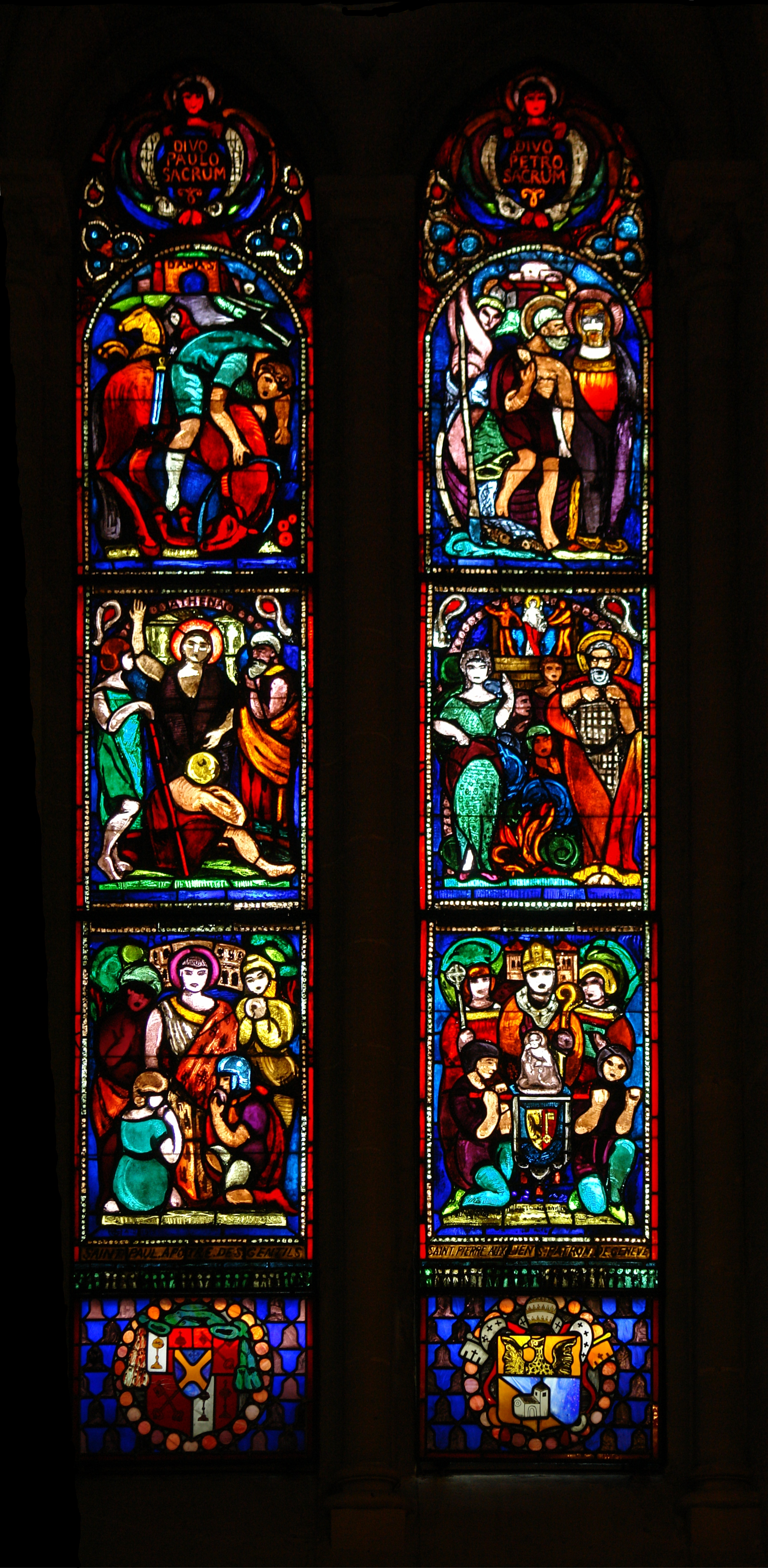

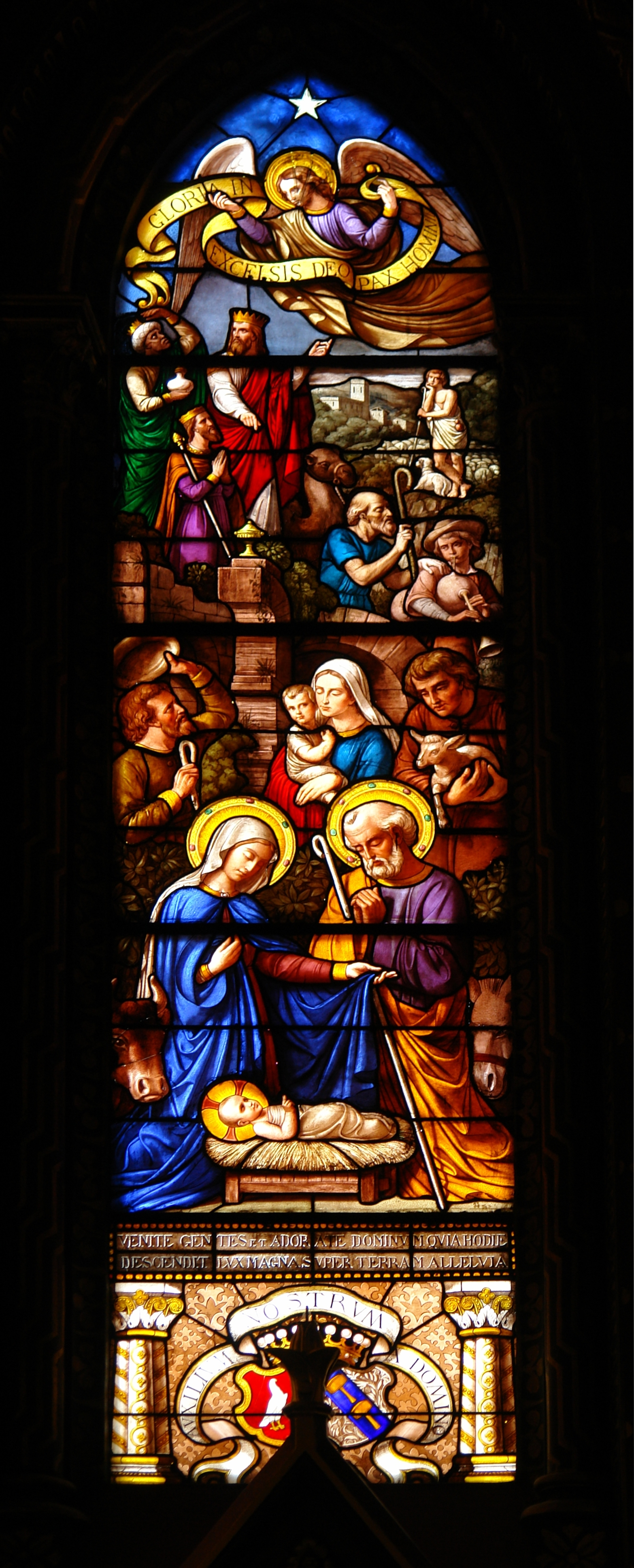

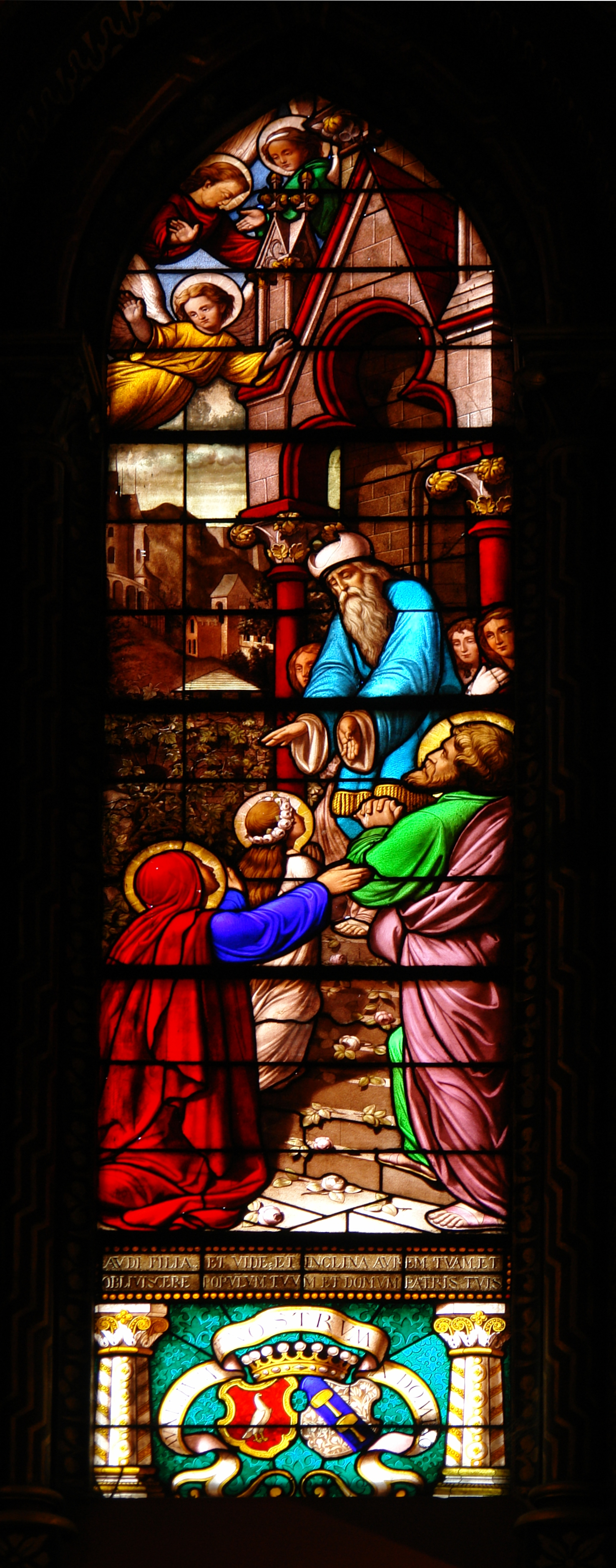

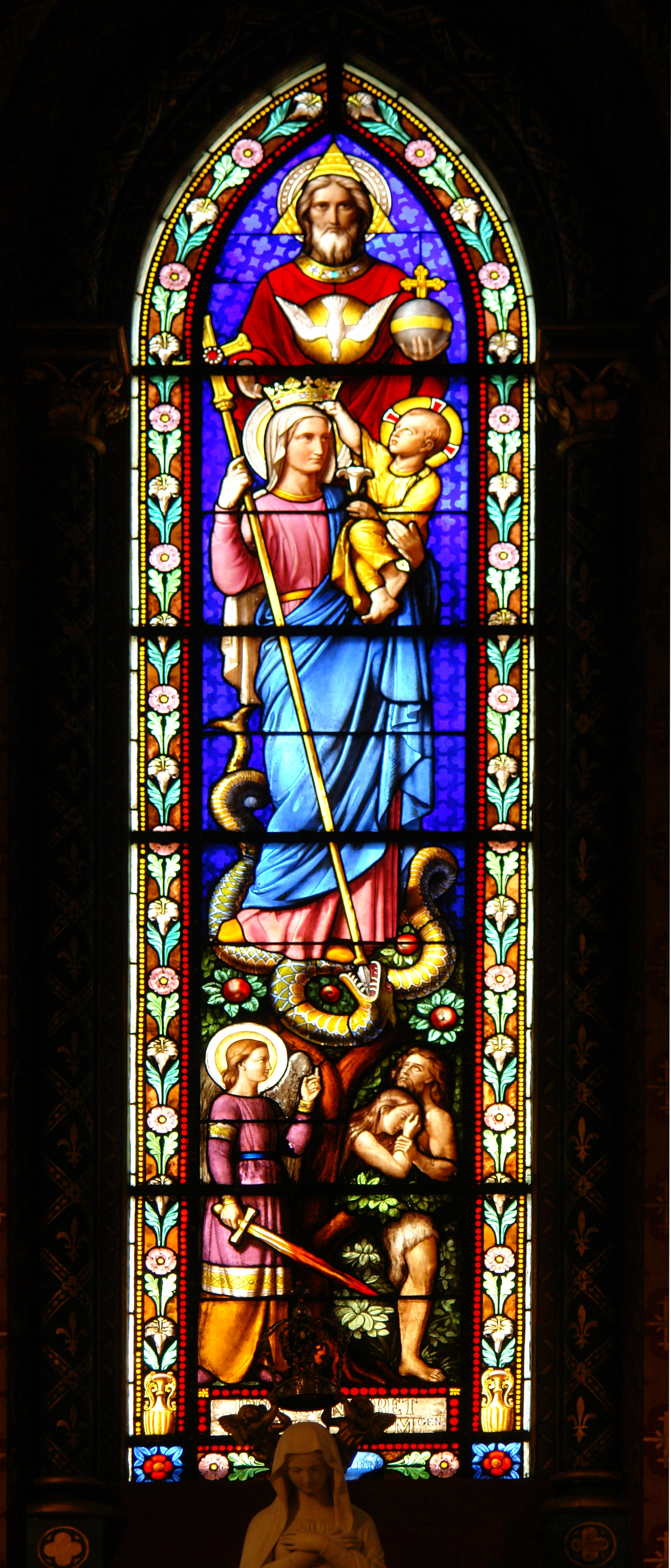

== See also ==
- St. Pierre Cathedral
