= Stanislas d'Escayrac de Lauture =

French explorer, geographer, diplomat and linguist

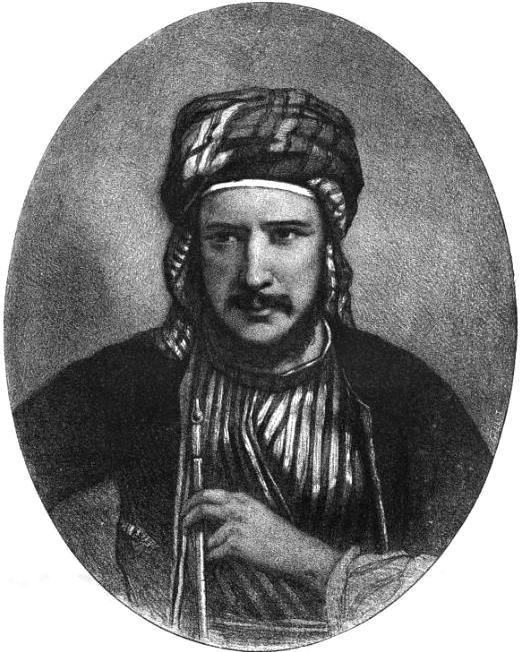
- Born: 19 March 1826; Paris
- Died: 18 December 1868 (aged 42); Fontainebleau
- Occupations: Explorer; Geographer; Linguist

Pierre Henri Stanislas d'Escayrac de Lauture, count then marquis of Escayrac, Commandeur of the Légion d'honneur (19 March 1826 – 18 December 1868) was a French explorer, geographer, diplomat and linguist.

He was born of an old aristocratic family of Quercy, of which three members took part in the Crusade of Louis IX of France. His father was Marquis Léonce d'Escayrac-Lauture, Pair de France, and his mother Adèle Portal, daughter of Baron Pierre-Barthélémy Portal d'Albarèdes, Minister of the Navy under Louis XVIII.

A French traveler and explorer, he made numerous trips to Africa and the East and left some interesting works.

== Biography ==
He entered the college of the Oratorians of Juilly at a young age. In 1856 he was called by the Viceroy of Egypt to lead an expedition to look for the sources of the Nile. Napoleon III gave him the cross of officer of the Legion of Honour to reward him for so worthily representing French science abroad. He became acquainted with Ferdinand de Lesseps, whom he met at Cairo, and became a fervent supporter of the Suez Canal. He returned to France in 1858, where he married Marie Rayer, the daughter of Dr. Pierre Rayer, ordinary physician of Napoleon III.

In 1860, to protect their commercial relations with the Far East, France and England became allies and dispatched their troops against the Chinese emperor. Scientists and explorers accompanied the soldiers. Count Stanislas of Escayrac of Lauture obtained his participation as chief of expedition at the Second Opium War. But while the soldiers were ransacking the Summer Palace, he fell into a trap on the road to Peking. Sequestered and tortured, he became the hostage of the Mandarins. He returned mutilated from captivity and dictated his Memoirs of China to his brother.

He had taken as his motto in his works: Aperire terram gentibus ("Opening the Earth to the nations").

He is buried with his parents in the family funerary chapel of the Cemetery of Saint-Louis, Versailles.

== Works ==
1849–1860: Research focusing on Africa

- « Exploration du pays des Dattes », extrait d’une lettre de M. d’Escayrac de Lauture à M. Flourens », in Nouvelles annales des voyages et des sciences géographiques, 1849, 5e série, t. XIX, pp. 227-229. online.
- « Extrait d'un mémoire sur le commerce du Soudan oriental », in Bulletin de la Société de géographie, July-December 1850, 3rd série, t. XIV, pp. 391-411. online.
- « Notice sur le Kordofan (Nubie supérieure) », in Bulletin de la Société de géographie, April 1851, 4th série, t. I, pp. 357-373. online.
- « Lettre de M. d'Escayrac de Lauture à M. de la Roquette [on the English expedition by James Richardson in central Africa] », in Bulletin de la Société de géographie, July-December 1851, 4e série t. II, pp. 186-241. online.
- Le Désert et le Soudan, Paris : Dumaine, 1853, XVI-631 p., pl. and maps. (abstracts published in the Nouvelles annales des voyages, 1854, 5e série, t. XXXVIII, pp. 77-105 online)
- « Routes africaines, moyens de transport, caravanes, mémoire extrait d'un ouvrage inédit sur le Désert et le Soudan par M. le comte d'Escayrac de Lauture, membre de la Société de géographie; lu à la séance générale du 22 avril », in Bulletin de la Société de géographie, 4e série, January–June 1853, t. V, pp. 204-240. online, reprint Paris: impr. de L. Martinet, 1853, 36 p. ; repris dans l’article « Routes africaines, moyens de transport et caravanes », in Journal des économistes, April–June 1854, pp. 429-440. online.
- « Départ de M. d'Escayrac pour l'Egypte et composition de la mission scientifique à la recherche des sources du Nil », in Nouvelles Annales des voyages, 1854, t. 3, p. 377.
- « Lettre de M. le comte d'Escayrac à M. le président de la Commission centrale, sur la latitude de Tombouctou », in Bulletin de la Société de géographie, July–December 1854, 4e série, t. VIII, pp. 32-35. online.
- « Extrait d'une lettre adressée du Caire à M. Jomard par le comte d'Escayrac de Lauture, membre de la Société », in Bulletin de la Société de géographie, July–December 1854, 4e série, t. VIII, pp. 101-104. online.
- « Mémoire sur le ragle ou hal–lucination du désert, adressé à l'Académie des sciences », in Bulletin de la Société de géographie, January–June 1855, 4e série, t. IX, pp. 121-139. online. ; Paris : J. Dumaine, 1855, 30 p.
- « De l'influence que le canal des deux mers exercera sur le commerce en général et sur celui de la mer Rouge en particulier », in Bulletin de la Société de géographie, May 1855, 4e série, t. IX, p. 274-298. online.
- « Extrait de deux lettres de M. le comte d'Escayrac à M. Jomard, », in Bulletin de la Société de géographie, January–June 1855, 4e série, t. IX, pp. 217-218, 313-314. online.
- « Mémoire sur le Soudan, géographie naturelle et politique, histoire et ethnographie, mœurs et institutions de l'Empire des Fellatas, du Bornou, du Baguermi, du Waday, du Dar-Four, rédigé, d'après des renseignements entièrement nouveaux et accompagné d'une esquisse du Soudan oriental », in Bulletin de la Société de géographie, 1855, 4e série, t. X, p. 89-239-t. XI, pp. 24-153. online t. X and t. XI, and Paris : Bertrand, 1855-1856, 184 p. maps.
- « Extrait de deux lettres adressées, l'une à M. Jomard, l'autre à M. Alfred Maury, sur les langues et l'histoire de diverses régions de l'Afrique orientale, par M. le comte d'Escayrac de Lauture », in Bulletin de la Société de géographie, 4e série, t. X, pp. 55-74. online.
- « Tactique, art de la guerre dans le Soudan. Extrait d'un mémoire sur l'état social de l'Afrique intérieure », in Nouvelles annales des voyages, de la géographie et de l'histoire et de l’archéologie, 1856, 6e série, t. V, pp. 367-375. online.
- « Mémoire sur l'état social de l'Afrique intérieure », in Bulletin de l'Académùie des Sciences morales et politiques, Paris, 1856, t. XXXVI, 50 p.
- « Extrait d'une lettre de M. le comte d'Escayrac » in Bulletin de la Société de géographie, July–December 1856, 4 série, t. XII, p. 400. online.
- « Expédition à la recherche des sources du Nil (1839–1840). Journal de M. Thibaut [dit Ibrahim Effendi], publié par les soins de M. le Cte d'Escayrac de Lauture [and V.-A. Malte-Brun] », in Nouvelles annales des voyages, de la géographie et de l'histoire et de l’archéologie, 1856, 6e série, t. V online.
- Prochain voyage à la recherche des sources du Nil blanc sous le commissariat de Monsieur d'Escayrac de Lauture. Questions et instructions de l'Académie des Sciences, Paris, 1856
- « M. d'Escayrac Lauture remercie l'Académie pour les Instructions rédigées à l'occasion de son exploration projetée du Soudan » and « Sur les causes qui ont fait échouer l'expédition; Lettre de M. d'Escayrac Lauture », in Comptes-rendus de l’Académie des Sciences, 1857, pp. 398, 1031. online and « Lettre adressée par M. le comte d'Escayrac de Lauture à l'Académie des sciences, et insérée par extrait dans le procès-verbal de la séance du lundi 25 mai 1857 » in Nouvelles annales des voyages, de la géographie et de l'histoire et de l’archéologie, 1857, 6e série, t. X, p. 333. online.
- « Lettre adressée par M. le comte d'Escayrac de Lauture au rédacteur de la Presse, en réponse à un article de ce journal inséré dans les numéros des 18 et 19 juin dernier », in Nouvelles annales des voyages, de la géographie et de l'histoire et de l’archéologie, 1857, 6e série, t. XI, p. 200 online.
- Voyage dans le grand Désert et au Soudan, Paris, Pouget-Coulon, 1858, XXIV-207 p.
- De la Turquie et des états musulmans en général, Paris : Amyot, 1858, VIII-184 p.
- « Notice sur le Darfour et sur le voyage de M. le docteur Cuny dans cette contrée », in Bulletin de la Société de géographie, April 1859, 4e série, t. XVII, pp. 281-321. online.

1860–1868: Research mainly devoted to China

- « Arithmétique des Chinois. Usage de l'Abacus ou Souwan-pan, par M. d'Escayrac de Lauture : extrait d'une lettre adressée de Chang-Haï, à M. Chasles », in Comptes Rendus des Séances de l'Académie des Sciences, July–December 1860, n° 51, pp. 88-92. online.
- « Considérations sur le passé et l'avenir de la Chine. Examen de la rébellion actuelle », in Bulletin de l'Académie des sciences morales et politiques, Paris, 1862, 32 p.
- De la transmission télégraphique et de la transcription littérale des caractères chinois, Paris : impr. de J. Best, 1862, 16 p. [editions in French and English: on the telegraphic transmission of the Chinese characters].
- Grammaire du télégraphe, histoire et lois du langage, hypothèse d'une langue analytique et méthodique, grammaire analytique universelle des signaux, 1862.
- Short explanation of the sketch of the analytic universal nautical code of signals, London : John Camden Hotten, Piccadilly, 1863.
- « Notice sur les déplacements des deux principaux fleuves de la Chine, lue à la Société de géographie, le 2 mai 1862 », in Bulletin de la Société de géographie, May 1862, pp. 274-286, map. online.
- « Récit de la captivité de M. le comte d'Escayrac de Lauture par les Chinois, fait par lui-même », in Nouvelles annales des voyages, de la géographie et de l'histoire et de l’archéologie, 1864, 6e série, t. XXXVIII, pp. 145-179. online.
- Mémoires sur la Chine, Paris : Librairie du Magasin pittoresque, 1864-1865, 6 parts in 1 vol (p. 1 published in February 1864; p. 2: June 1864; p. 3: Religion, August 1864; p. 4: Gouvernement (October 1864); p. 5: coûtumes, November 1864).
- Die afrikanische Wüste und das Land der Schwarzen am obern Nil, nach dem Französischen des Grafen d'Escayrac de Lauture [deutsch bearbeitet, von Karl Andree], Neue Ausgabe, 1867.
- La Guerre, l'organisation de l'armée et l'équité, Paris : A. Le Chevalier, 1867, 155 p.
- La Chine et les Chinois, Paris : A. Delahays, 1877 (posthumous edition).

== Bibliography ==
- N. Broc, Dictionnaire illustré des explorateurs français du XIXe siècle, Editions du comité des travaux historiques et scientifiques, 1988.
- Paul Durand-Lapie, Le comte d'Escayrac de Lauture, Voyageur et explorateur français, commandeur de la Légion d'Honneur, Paris : Champion, 1899, 180 p.
- Victor-Adolphe Malte-Brun, « Notice sur les voyages et les travaux de M. le Comte d'Escayrac de Lauture » in Bulletin de la Société de géographie, janvier à juin 1869, 5e série, t.XVII, p. 168-193 online; and Paris : Martinet, 1869.
- Camille Martinet, L'otage des mandarins, Paris : éditions France-Empire, 1989, 172 p. (vie romancée)
- J. Saint-Martin, Le Comte d'Escayrac de Lauture, sa captivité chez les Chinois, 1859-1860, Noyon : G. Andrieux, 1885, 51 p.
- Jules Verne, Cinq semaines en ballon, chap. 1 and chap. 4.
- H. de Woelmont, Notices généalogiques, 1923, p. 186.
