= Augusta Holmès =

French and Irish composer (1847–1903)

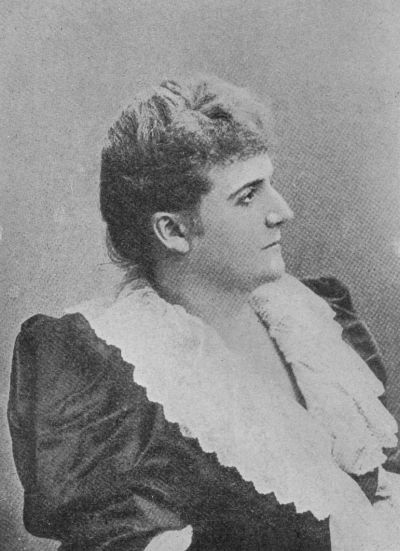
- Born: Augusta Mary Anne Holmes; 16 December 1847; Rue de Berri, 8th arrondissement of Paris, France
- Died: 28 January 1903 (aged 55); Versailles, Yvelines, France
- Resting place: Cemetery of Saint-Louis
- Citizenship: France (from 1871)
- Occupation: Composer
- Partners: Catulle Mendès; (1869 – c. 1886)
- Children: 5
- Relatives: Henri Barbusse (son-in-law)

Signature
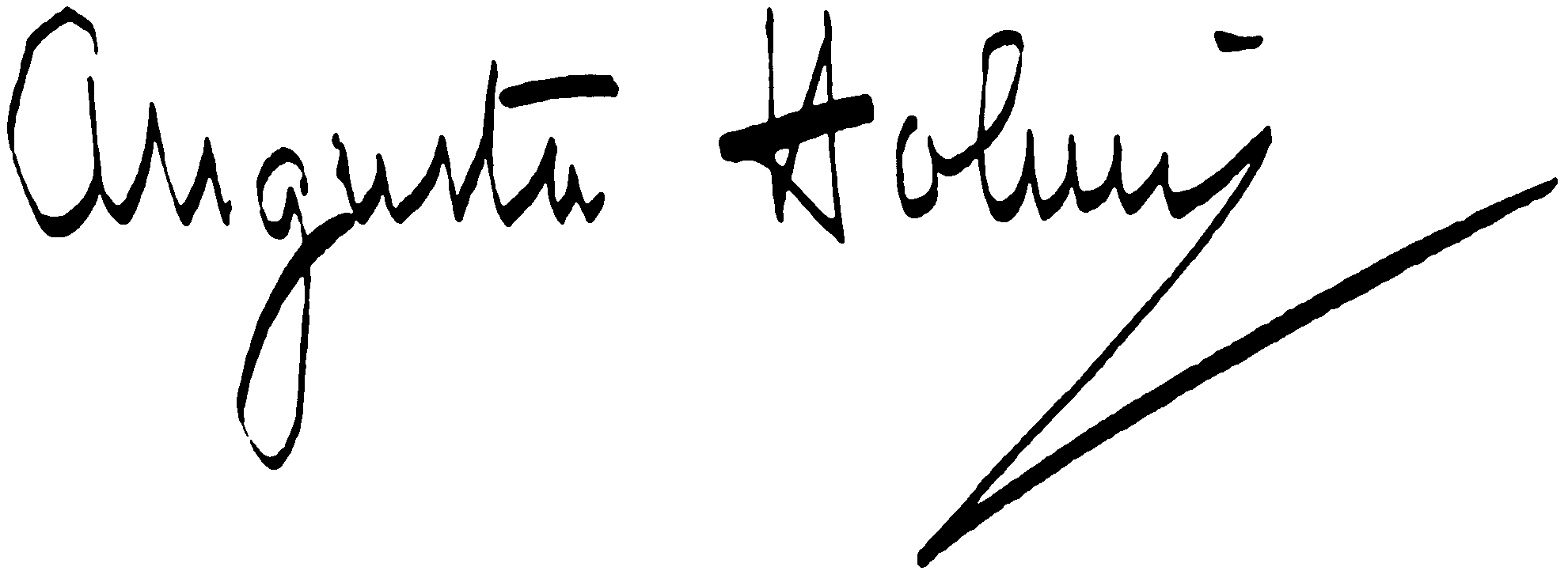

Augusta Mary Anne Holmès (née Holmes; 16 December 1847 – 28 January 1903), also known by the pseudonym Hermann Zenta, was a French and Irish composer. Holmès wrote the texts to almost all of her vocal music herself, including songs, oratorios, the libretto of her opera La Montagne noire and the programmatic poems for her symphonic poems including Irlande and Andromède.

== Early life and education ==
Holmès was born Augusta Mary Anne Holmes on 16 December 1847 on the Rue de Berri in 8th arrondissement of Paris, to Irish parents Captain Dalkeith Holmes and Augusta Holmes (née Shearer; died 1857), a writer. The goddaughter of the poet Alfred de Vigny, Holmès' was rumored to be De Vigny's biological daughter. Holmès was raised in Versailles.

Despite showing talent at the piano, she was not allowed to study at the Paris Conservatoire, but took lessons privately. She developed her piano playing under the tutelage of local pianist Mademoiselle Peyronnet, the organist of Versailles Cathedral Henri Lambert, and Hyacinthe Klosé. She showed some of her earlier compositions to Franz Liszt. Around 1876, she became a pupil of César Franck, whom she considered her real master. She led the group of Franck's students who in 1891 commissioned for Franck's tomb a bronze medallion from Auguste Rodin.

== Musical career and style ==
For the 1889 celebration of the centennial of the French Revolution, Holmès was commissioned to write the Ode triomphale for the Exposition Universelle, a work requiring about 1,200 musicians. Jean-Baptiste Lavastre designed the immense panoramic painting decorating the stage of the Palais de l'Industrie which served as a setting for its performance.

She gained a reputation of being a composer of programme music with political meaning, such as her symphonic poems Irlande and Pologne.

Holmès' oeuvre is made up of cantatas, symphonic poems, operas, a few works for solo piano and over 100 songs.

First hearing Wagner's work at the age of 13, Holmès was influenced by him all her life, and advocated to have his works performed in the Concerts Populaires, a formidable concert series in Paris. Many parallels can be found in the music of Holmès and Wagner. One of the most direct examples of stylistic likeness can be heard in Wagner's Ride of the Valkyries from Die Walküre (1856) and Holmès' Roland furieux (1876). Both works make use of chromaticism and use similar orchestral colour, with dominant brass sections, announcing strong, rhythmically catching, melodic motives, while the strings drive the music forward with rapid, galloping patterns underneath the melody.

Holmès wrote four operas, largely inspired by Wagner, however, La Montagne Noire, staged in 1895, was the only one to be performed. It was one of the few operas written by a woman to be produced at the Paris Opéra in the nineteenth century, but it was poorly received, possibly due to its outdated Wagnerian influences.

The gender rhetoric of the nineteenth century, which prescribed that female composers should limit themselves to smaller, feminine genres, had an impact on the reception of the music of Holmès. Although praised for her creative gifts, she, like many other female composers of her time, was criticised for crossing the boundary into styles which were thought of as masculine territory. Saint-Saëns, in a review of Holmès' symphonic poem, Les Argonautes, remarked on her "excessive virility – a frequent fault with women composers – and flamboyant orchestration in which the brass explodes like fireworks..."

== Personal life ==
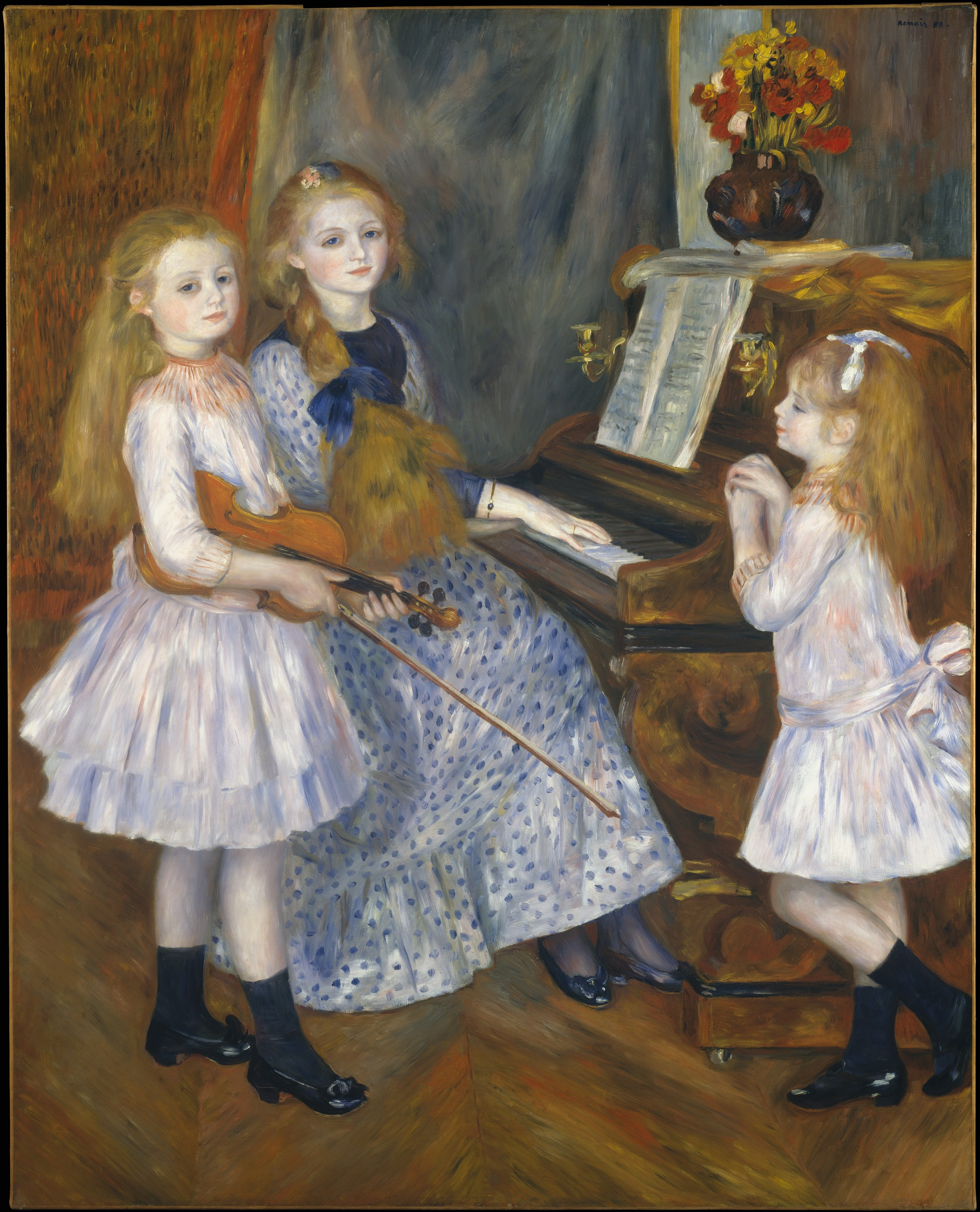
A portrait of Holmès' daughters, Huguette, Claudine, and Helyonne, by Auguste Renoir, 1888, at The Metropolitan Museum of Art

Camille Saint-Saëns was among the many artists - musicians, poets, painters - who became enamoured of her and fell in love with her, eventually proposing marriage, but he was turned down. Later, he wrote of Holmès in the journal Harmonie et Mélodie: "Like children, women have no idea of obstacles, and their willpower breaks all barriers. Mademoiselle Holmès is a woman, an extremist." Like other female composers from the nineteenth century including Fanny Mendelssohn, Holmès published some of her earlier works under a male pseudonym ("Hermann Zenta") because women in European society at that time were not taken seriously as artists and were discouraged from publishing.

In 1869, Holmès met the poet, critic and editor Catulle Mendès. Holmès and Mendès later lived together and had three daughters and possibly two sons. The couple's daughters are the subject of the 1888 painting "The Daughters of Catulle Mendès" by Pierre-Auguste Renoir. By 1885, Holmès and Mendès had separated and the children remained in the care of their father. The couple's youngest daughter, Helyonne, married Henri Barbusse in 1898.

In 1871, Holmès became a French national and added the e-grave accent to her last name. Having previously been part of the Theosophist and Spiritualist movement, Holmès converted to catholicism in 1902 and was baptized at the Église Saint-Philippe-du-Roule.

On 28 January 1903, Holmès died in Versailles aged 55. Holmès is buried at the Cemetery of Saint-Louis.

== Legacy ==
Holmès bequeathed most of her musical manuscripts to the Paris Conservatoire. Maud Gonne unveiled a monument to her memory on 18 July 1904.

== Selected compositions ==
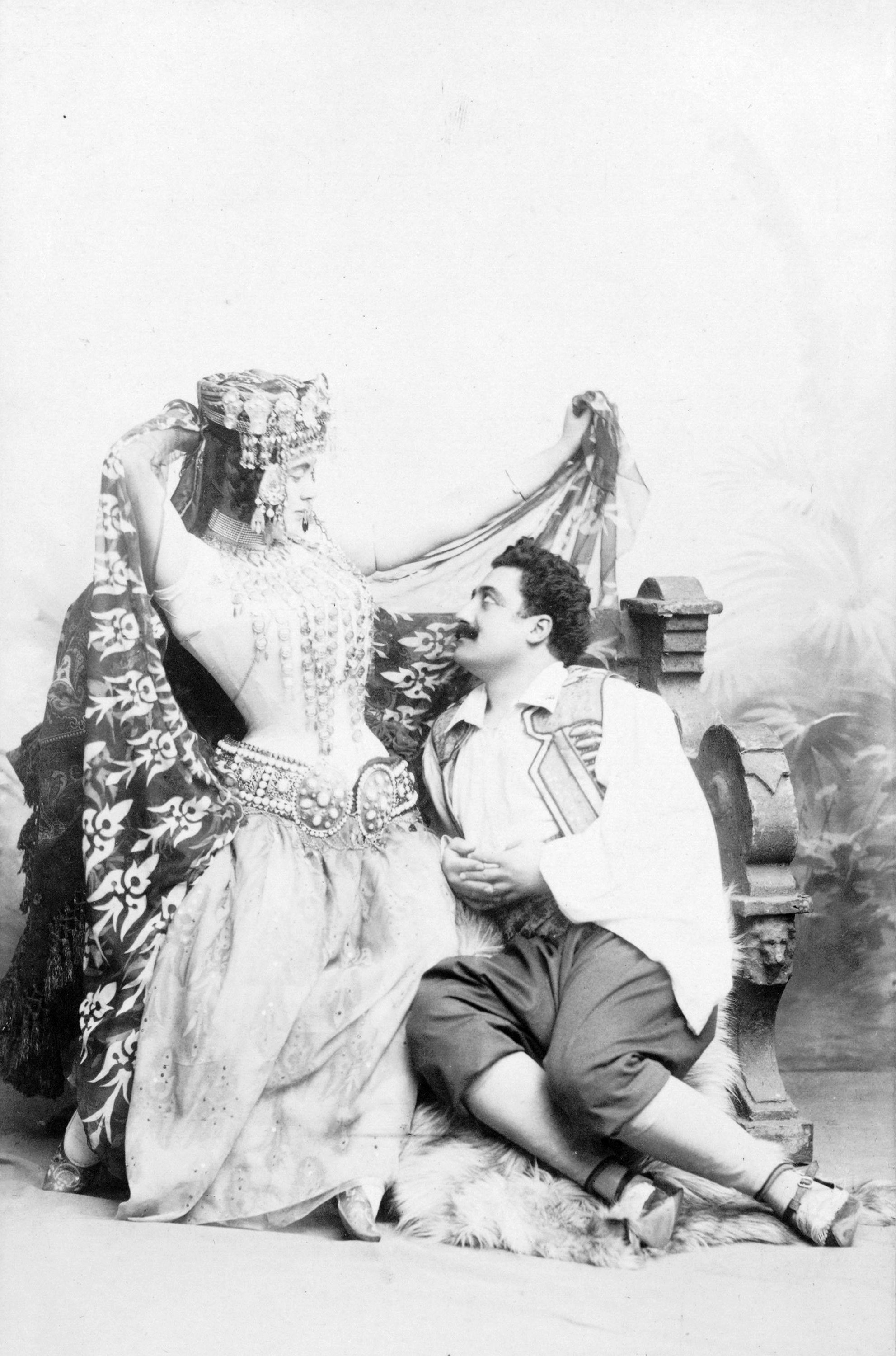
Maurice Renaud & Lucienne Bréval in Augusta Holmès' opera, La Montagne noire.

=== Operas ===
- Héro et Leandre (1875) opera in one act
- Lancelot du lac, opera in three acts (unpublished)
- La Montagne noire, opera in four acts (1885), Paris, Opéra, 8 February 1895. The Black Mountain was recreated at Theater Dortmund on January 13, 2024 with Aude Extrémo (Yamina), Sergey Radchenko (Mirko) and Mandla Mndebele (Aslar), and the Dortmunder Philharmoniker conducted by Motonori Kobayashi.

=== Cantatas ===
- Astarté, poème musical (1871, unpublished)
- Lutèce, symphonie dramatique (1877)
- Les Argonautes, symphonie dramatique (1880)
- Ludus pro patria, ode-symphonie (1888)
- Au pays bleu, suite symphonique (c.1888)
- Une Vision de Sainte Thérèse for soprano and orchestra (c.1888)
- Ode triomphale en l'honneur du centenaire de 1789 (1889)
- Hymne à la paix (1890)
- Hymne à Apollo (c.1890s)
- La Belle au bois dormant suite lyrique (1902)
- La Vision de la reine, cantata

=== Orchestral works ===
- Ouverture pour une comédie, symphonic poem (before 1870)
- Allegro feroce (1870)
- Roland furieux (1876)
- Irlande, symphonic poem (1882)
- Andromède, symphonic poem (1883)
- Pologne, symphonic poem (1883)
- La Nuit et l'amour (1888)

=== Chamber music ===
- Minuetto, for string quartet (1867)
- Trois petites pièces for flute and piano (1879)
- Fantaisie in C minor, for clarinet and piano (1900)
- Molto lento, for clarinet and piano

=== Piano music ===
- Rêverie tzigane (1887)
- Ce qu'on entendit dans la nuit de Noël (1890)
- Ciseau d'hiver (1892)

=== Songs, song collections ===
(selective list)

- Les Sept ivresses: 1. L'Amour; 2. Le Vin; 3. La Gloire; 4. La Haine; 5. Le Rêve; 6. Le Désir; 7. L'Or (1882)
- Trois Chansons populaires: 1. Mignonne; 2. Les Trois pages; 3. La Princesse (1883)
- Noël: Trois anges sont venus ce soir (1884)
- En Chemin (1886)
- Hymne à Eros (1886)
- Fleur de neige (1887)
- La Chanson de gas d'Irlande (1891)
- Berceuse (1892)
- Contes divines (1892–5): 1. L'Aubepine de Saint Patrick (1892); 2. Les Lys bleus (1892); 3. Le Chemin de ciel (1893); 4. La Belle Madeleine (1893); 5. La Légende de Saint Amour (1893); 6. Les Moutons des anges (1895)
- Noël d'Irlande (1896)

== Bibliography ==
- Rollo Myers: "Augusta Holmès: A Meteoric Career", in: The Musical Quarterly 53 (1967) 3, pp. 365–76
- Gérard Geffen: Augusta Holmès, l'outrancière (Paris: P. Belfond, 1987), ISBN 2-7144-2153-9
- Karen Henson: "In the House of Disillusion: Augusta Holmès and La Montagne noir", in: Cambridge Opera Journal 9 (1997) 3, pp. 232–62
- Michèle Friang: Augusta Holmès ou la gloire interdite (Paris: Éditions Autrement, 2003), ISBN 2746702983
- Mariateresa Storino: "Chère Illustre": Franz Liszt ad Augusta Holmès, in: "Quaderni dell'Istituto Liszt" 9 (2010), pp. 1–44
- M. Storino: Franz Liszt and Augusta Holmès: Portrait of a Musical Friendship, in: Liszt et la France, ed. by Malou Haine and Nicolas Dufetel (Paris: Vrin, 2012), pp. 263–274; ISBN 978-2-7116-2369-3
- Nicole K. Strohmann: Gattung, Geschlecht und Gesellschaft im Frankreich des ausgehenden 19. Jahrhunderts: Studien zur Dichterkomponistin Augusta Holmès (Hildesheim: Georg Olms, 2012), ISBN 978-3-487-14701-7
- M. Storino: Solidarietà dei Popoli e idea di Patria: i poemi sinfonici di Augusta Holmès, in: Music and War in Europe from French Revolution to WWI, ed. by Etienne Jardin (Turnhout: Brepols, 2016), pp. 357–377; ISBN 978-2-503-57032-7
