= Cemetery of Notre-Dame, Versailles =

Cemetery in France

Coordinates: 48.8139°N 2.1307°E

The Cemetery of Notre-Dame, Versailles (French: Cimetière Notre-Dame), is a cemetery in Versailles, Yvelines, France, near the Palace of Versailles. It was established by the church and parish of Notre-Dame in 1777, and covers three hectares. The postal address is 15 Rue des Missionnaires.

Besides quantities of burials of aristocrats, members of religious orders and people of artistic or historic interest, there is also an enclosed section for soldiers of the Prussian army who fell during the Franco-Prussian War of 1870–71.

== Notable burials ==
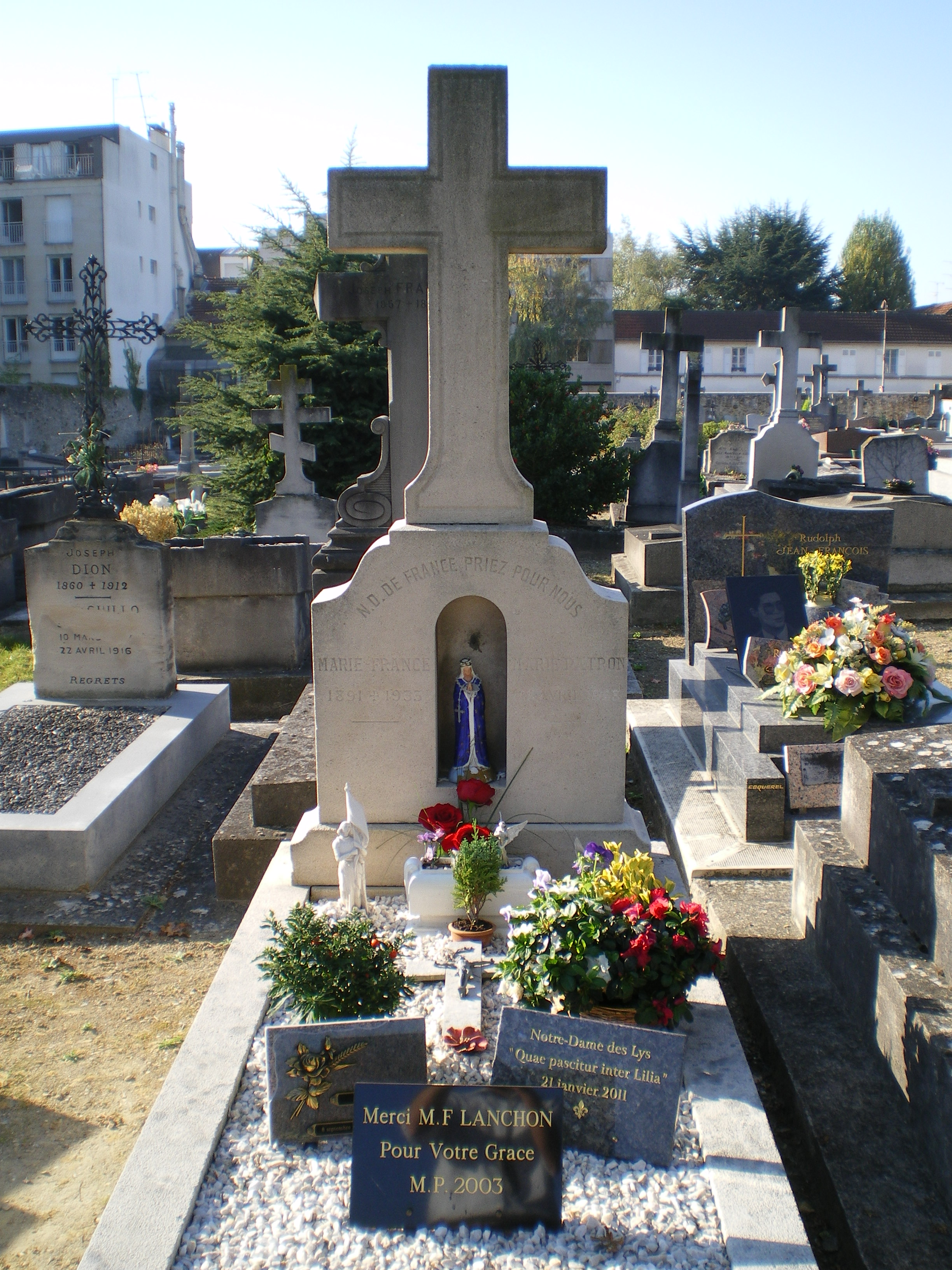
Tomb of Marcelle Lanchon

- fr:Félix Antoine Appert (1817–1891), general
- fr:Jean-François Chiappe (1931–2001), historian
- Jeanne Potot de Commarmond (1779–1866), second wife of André-Marie Ampère
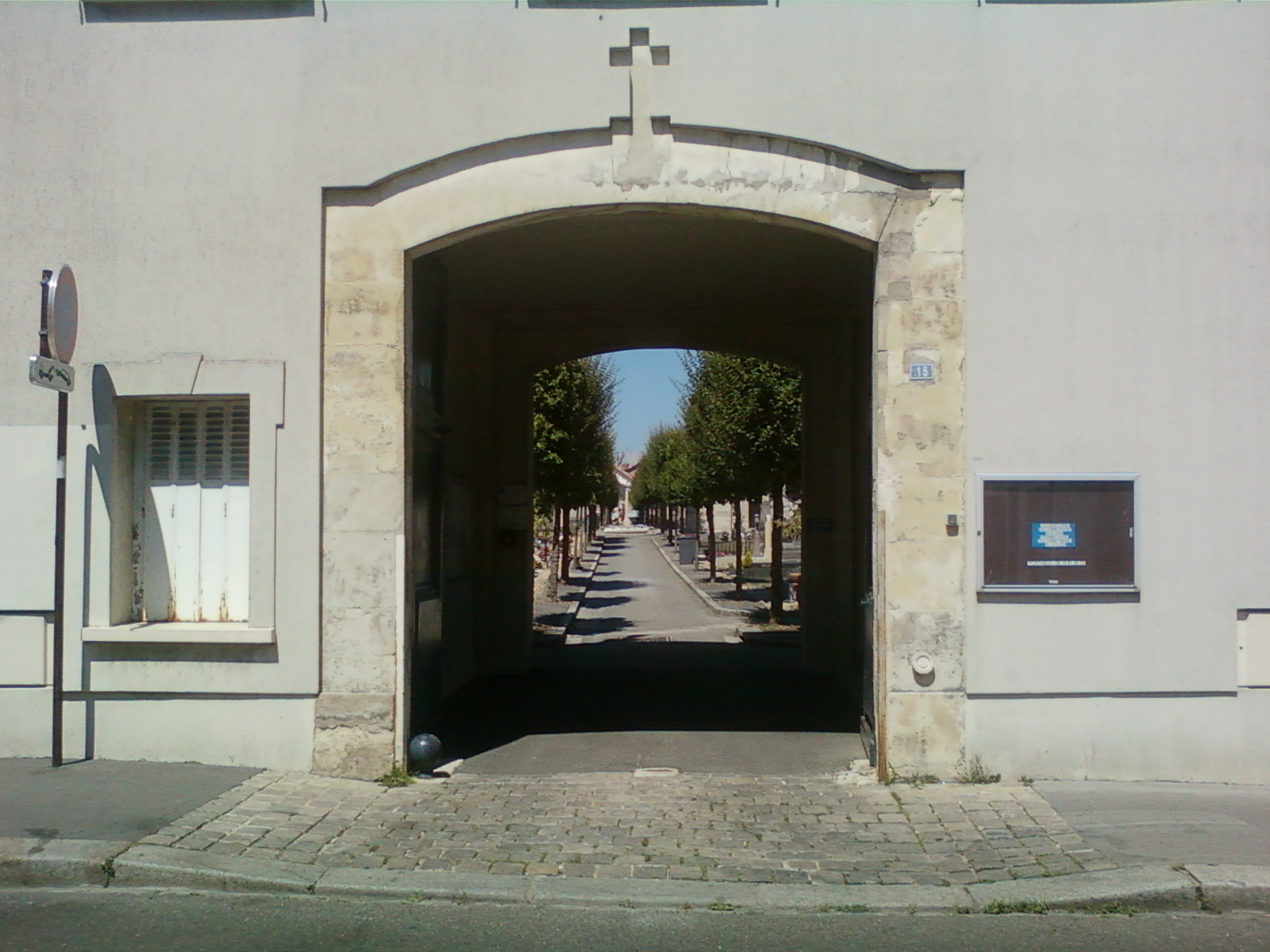
- Cimetière Notre-Dame de Versailles - Entrée
  Émile Deschamps (1791–1871), poet (his tomb is anonymous, with only the inscription: Ci-gît un poète - "Here lies a poet")
- Louis-Édouard Dubufe (1819–1883), painter, brother-in-law of Gounod
- Jules Favre (1809–1880), lawyer, Minister of Foreign Affairs under the Third Republic
- André François-Poncet (1887–1978), ambassador, Academician
- Baron Étienne Hastrel de Rivedoux (1766–1846), general of the Empire, governor of Hamburg
- fr:Gustave Heuzé (1816–1907), agronomist
- Marcelle Lanchon (1891–1933), a religious who received visions of the Blessed Virgin Mary
- Jeanne-Marie (1875–1947) and Frédéric Petitjean de La Rosière (1876–1949), authors of sentimental popular novels under the joint pen name of Delly
- fr:Frédéric Nepveu (1777–1862), one of the architects of the Palace of Versailles
- Michel Peter (1824–1893), member of the Académie de Médecine
- Andrés de Santa Cruz (1792–1865), president of Peru and of Bolivia (his ashes were repatriated to Bolivia in 1965).

== See also ==
- Cimetière des Gonards
- Cemetery of Saint-Louis, Versailles
