= Cemetery of Saint-Louis, Versailles =

Cemetery in Yvelines Department, France

Coordinates: 48.7927°N 2.1223°E

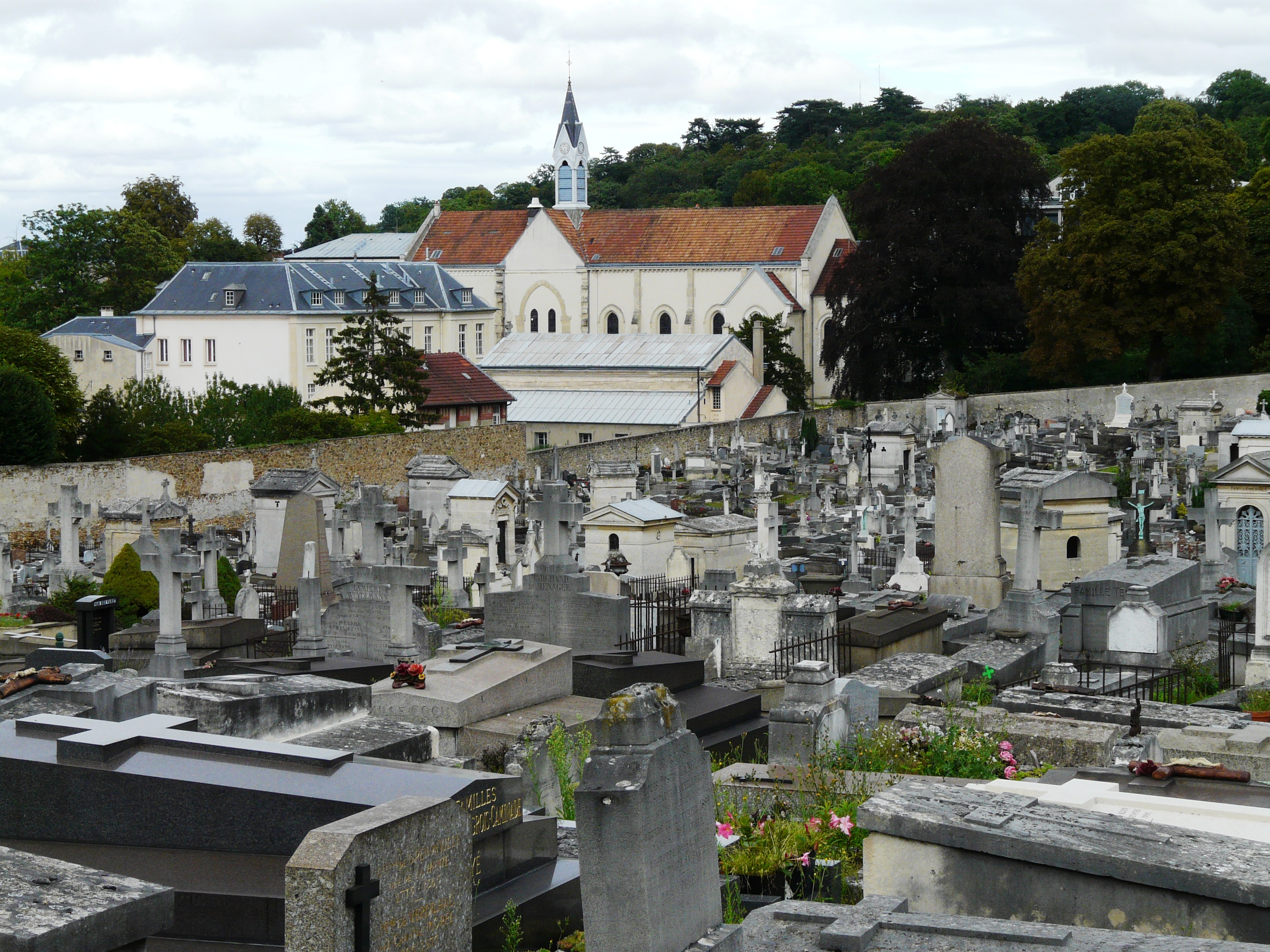
View of the cemetery

The Cemetery of Saint-Louis, Versailles (French: Cimetière Saint-Louis de Versailles) is one of several cemeteries in Versailles, Yvelines. It is among the oldest urban cemeteries in France, having been established in 1770 by the parish of Saint-Louis, Versailles, the church of which is now Versailles Cathedral. Although it may house fewer graves of well-known persons than the Cemetery of Notre-Dame, Versailles, it is nevertheless of significant interest for the artistic quality of many of the tombs and for the quantity of graves of aristocratic families and military officers based at the nearby Palace of Versailles.

A small column against the wall marks the site of the common ditch where some 40 persons were buried, victims of the September Massacres on 9 September 1792. The massacre itself took place at the Quatre Bornes ("Four Milestones"), at the present crossroads between the Rue de Satory and the Rue d'Orléans. The victims had been transferred from the prison at Orléans, and were mostly former senior government officials, officers of the Royal army or refractory priests (among them the Bishop of Mende).

Certain monuments are distinguished by their unusual workmanship, for example that of the naval lieutenant Édouard Villaret-Joyeuse (died in 1854 at Havana), which is in the form of a rostral column.

== Notable burials ==
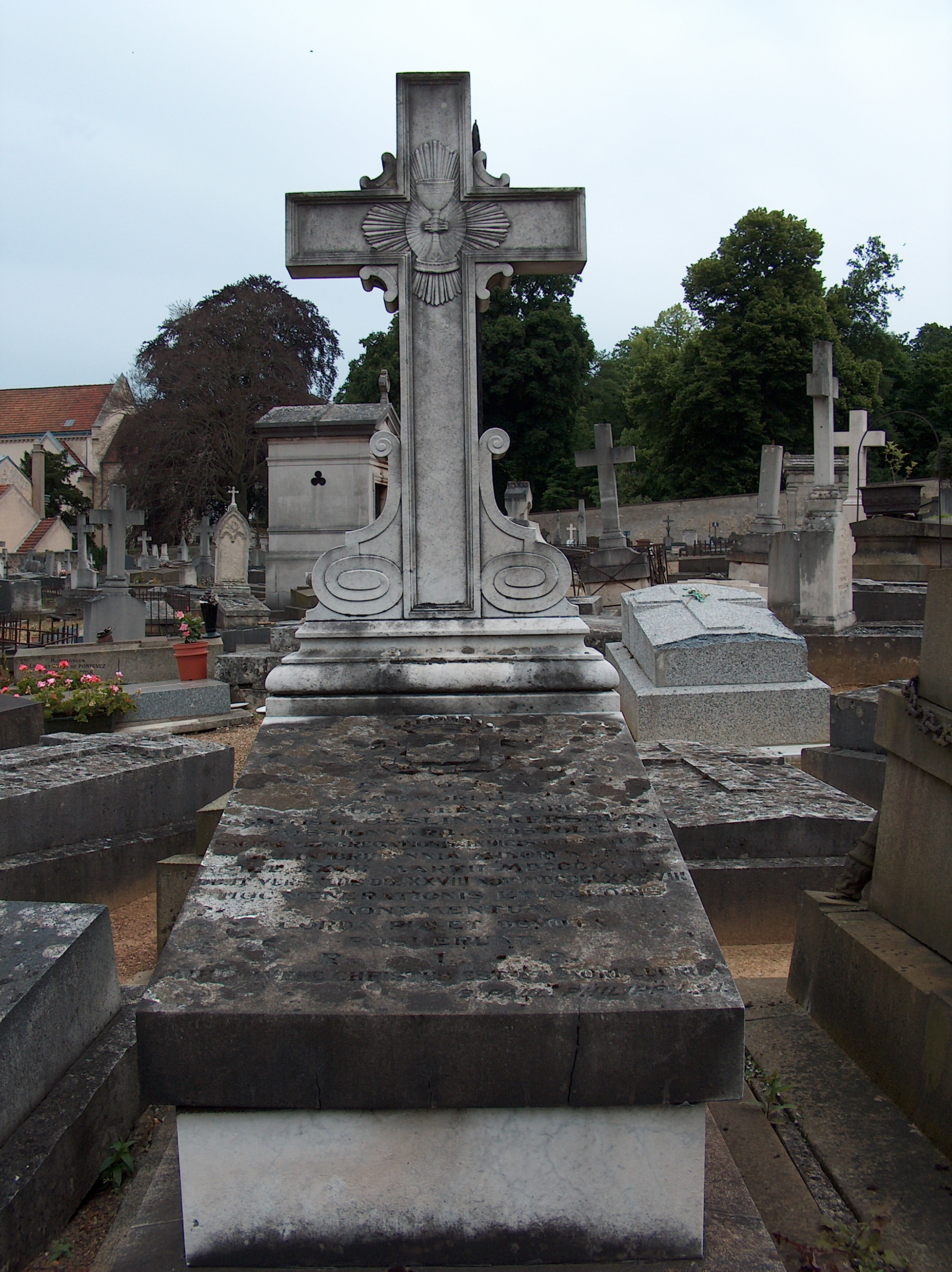
Tomb of the Abbé de Geslin

- Comte Ferdinand de Bertier de Sauvigny (1782–1864), deputy and prefect of Calvados
- Gustave Borgnis-Desbordes (1839–1900), general, noted for his victories in the colonies
- Alexandre-François Caminade (1783–1862), painter
- Jean-Arnaud de Castellane (1733–1792), Bishop of Mende, in the common ditch
- François Chabas (1817–1882), Egyptologist
- Édouard Charton (1807–1890), Saint-Simonist journalist
- Louis Hercule Timoléon de Cossé-Brissac, duc de Brissac (1734–1792), former governor of Paris, in the common ditch
- Jean-François Ducis (1733–1816), dramaturgist
- Charles Durand, comte de Linois (1761–1848), vice-admiral, governor of Guadeloupe
- Louis-Étienne Dussieux (1815–1894), historian
- Léonce d'Escayrac-Lauture, marquis d'Escayrac (1786–1867), peer of France, deputy
- Stanislas d'Escayrac de Lauture (1822–1868), explorer
- François Franchet d'Esperey (1778–1863), politician, ambassador to Berlin, grandfather of Maréchal Franchet d'Esperey
- Charles-Xavier Franqueville d'Abancourt (1758–1792), briefly Minister of War, nephew of Calonne, in the common ditch
- Abbé Paul de Geslin, known as Jean Loyseau (1817–1888), Pallottine, journalist
- Henri-Constant Groussau (1851–1936), monarchist deputy
- Augusta Holmes (1847–1903), composer
- Jean-Baptiste-Antoine Lassus (1807–1857), architect
- Claudius Lavergne (1815–1887), glass painter, pupil of Ingres. He lies next to his wife, Julie Lavergne (1823–1886), writer
- Henri Le Sidaner (1862–1939), painter, brother-in-law of Georges Rouault
- Jean-Baptiste Mathieu (1764–1847), composer, Master of the King's Chapel
- Anders Osterlind (1887–1960), painter
- Paul Pierret (1836–1916), Egyptologist
- Georges Rouault (1871–1958), painter, brother-in-law of Henri Le Sidaner
- Jean Tharaud (1877–1952), writer
- Claude Antoine de Valdec de Lessart (1741–1792), briefly Minister of Finance and Foreign Affairs of the Constituante, in the common ditch

== See also ==
- Cimetière des Gonards
- Cemetery of Notre-Dame, Versailles
