= Pierre-Barthélémy Portal d'Albarèdes =

French politician

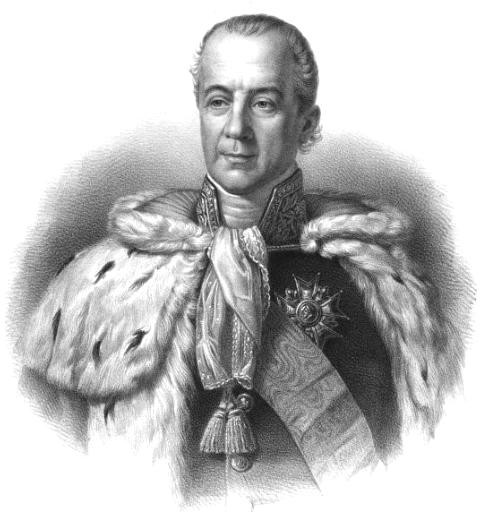
Pierre-Barthélémy Portal d'Albarèdes

Pierre-Barthélémy Portal d'Albarèdes, Baron Portal, (30 October 1765, Montauban (Albarèdes) – 11 January 1845, Bordeaux) was a French politician born into a Protestant family of Guienne.

== Biography ==
He was the son of Pierre Portal, a merchant, and Guillemette Delfau. He and his brother Paul were taken into service with the merchant navy in 1783 at Bordeaux. He created in 1789 a trading house, under the name Portal Larrode and Co. During the consulate he ran a firm known as Portal P.B. and during the First French Empire it became known as Portal et Cie. He married Élisabeth-Margueritte Bergès at Montauban on 16 February 1792. He was a member of the Board of Trade (1801) and the Chamber of Commerce of Bordeaux at the beginning of its creation (1803).

After the Bourbon Restoration Portal left trade to become a politician first as director of colonies before being elected a deputy for Tarn-et-Garonne in 1816 and being appointed a baron on 2 May 1818. He was then Minister of Marine and Colonies (December 1818 – December 1821). He was a judge at the tribunal of commerce, mayor of Bordeaux, member for trade in Bordeaux to demand the restitution of goods seized by U.S. ships, appointed by Napoleon, master of requests in 1813, member of the Tarn-et-Garonne in 1818 Peer of France, regent of the bank of Bordeaux.

He was appointed hereditary baron by letters patent of 1818, Baron-hereditary peerage by letters of 1821.

The Musée des Beaux-Arts of Bordeaux keeps a bust of him by the sculptor, Dominique Fortune Maggese. His body is interred at the Protestant cemetery in Bordeaux.

He was the brother of Paul Portal, president of the Chamber of Commerce of Bordeaux. His grandson, Count Stanislas d'Escayrac de Lauture, French explorer, wrote an interesting account of his travels.

Political offices
Preceded by Louis-Mathieu Molé	Ministers of Marine and the Colonies; 29 December 1818 – 14 December 1821	Succeeded by Aimé, duc de Clermont-Tonnerre
