= Claudius Lavergne =

French artist (1815–1887)

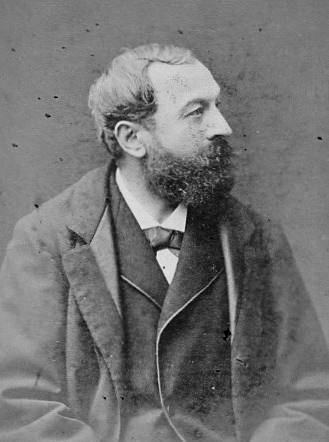
Claudius Lavergne (date unknown)

Claudius Lavergne (10 December 1815 – 31 December 1887) was a French artist who primarily worked in stained glass. He was also an art critic and an inspector of historical monuments.

== Biography ==
Lavergne was born in Lyon. His father, Marin Lavergne (1796-1881), was a painter of heraldry and carriages. His mother, Marie, died while giving birth to his brother Pierre in 1817. He began his education at a school associated with the Basilica of Saint-Martin d'Ainay. After graduating, he attended the École nationale supérieure des beaux-arts de Lyon, where he studied with Claude Bonnefond. In 1834, his father sent him to study with Ingres at the French Academy in Rome.

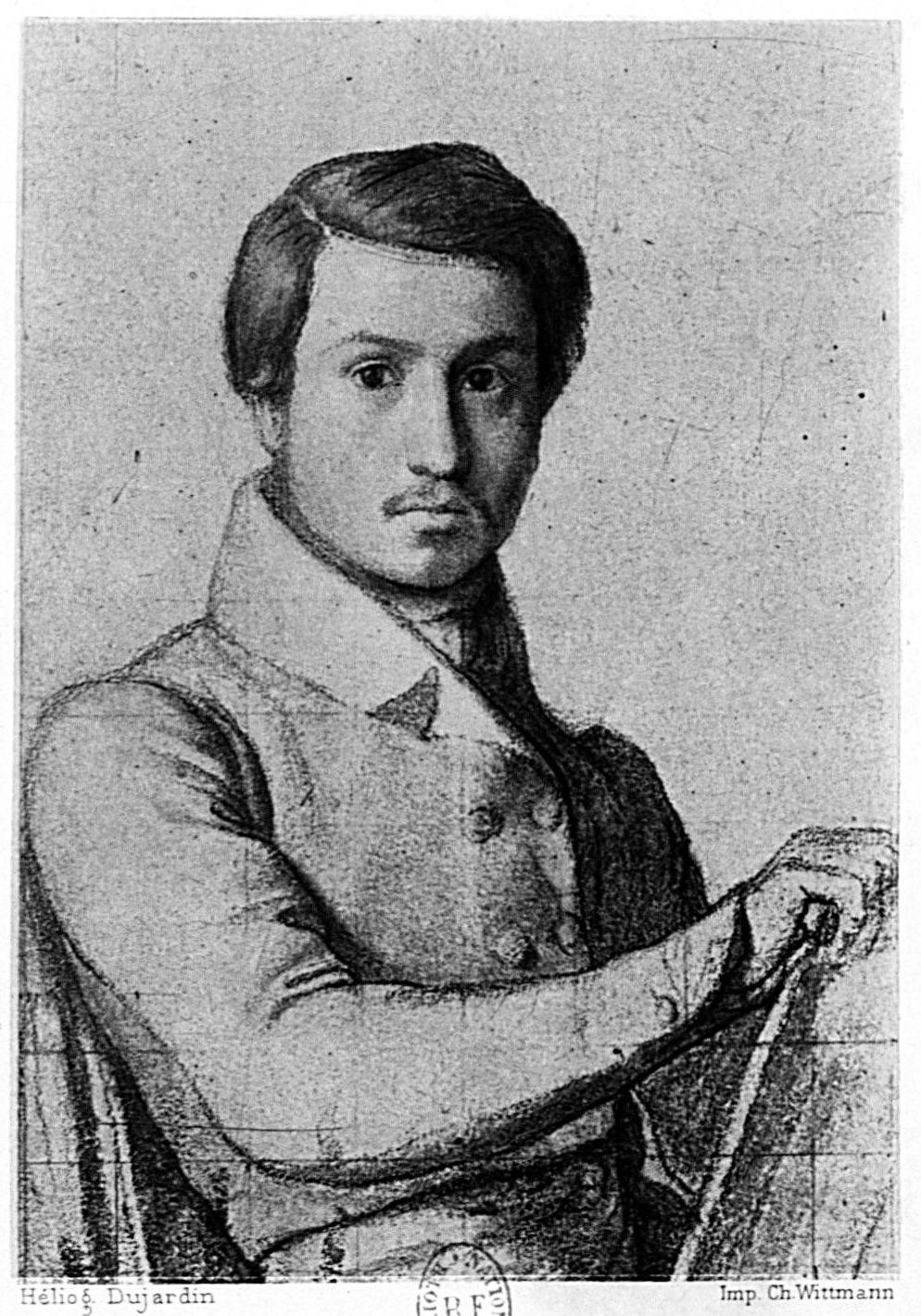
Claudius Lavergne age twenty

Lavergne had his first exhibit at the Salon of 1838, with a painting of Jesus surrounded by children. In 1840 he returned to France, for health reasons, and became a member of the Third Order of Saint Dominic. Four years later, he married Julie Ozaneaux, a daughter of the writer and academician, Georges Ozaneaux in the church of Saint-Louis-en-l'Île by Abbé Jean-Baptiste Henri Lacordaire. They were friends of Gaspard Mermillod. She became a writer, of tales and short stories. They had nine children, two of whom died in infancy. Two others became religious sisters, and died young. Their son Georges-Claudius Lavergne (1847-1923) became famous as a master glassmaker.

Lavergne produced his first major work in 1853: a mural in the chapel of the Château de Châtillon-d'Azergues. Three years later, the sculptor Émilien de Nieuwerkerke, acting as an agent of the Second Empire, commissioned him to design twelve windows depicting the twelve apostles for the chapel at the Hôpital Lariboisière, with the stipulation that he also create the windows. As a result, Lavergne opened his first workshop in Paris.

Lavergne worked with Eugène Viollet-le-Duc as an architectural inspector, which enabled him to deepen his knowledge of stained glass and begin a new artistic career, creating a glass painting workshop that would be passed to his sons Georges and Noël. Later, he became President of the Union of Master Glassmakers; a position he held until his death. During this time. he also worked as an art critic for L'Univers illustré.

In addition to his original works, he restored windows at the Chapels in the Château de Versailles, and the Château de Blois, as well as at the Church of Saint-Léonard in Alençon, the Cathédrale Notre-Dame de Noyon, and the Cathédrale Saint-Pierre de Rennes. These works earned him the title of Commander in the Order of St. Gregory the Great.

For the Chapel of St. Augustine in Notre-Dame-des-Victoires, Paris, Lavergne did a beautiful stained glass window depicting Louis XIII consecrating France to Mary. Behind the choir is a "Crucifixion", also by Lavergne.

Lavergne died at his home in Paris, shortly after his seventy-second birthday, and was interred at the Cemetery of Saint-Louis, Versailles.

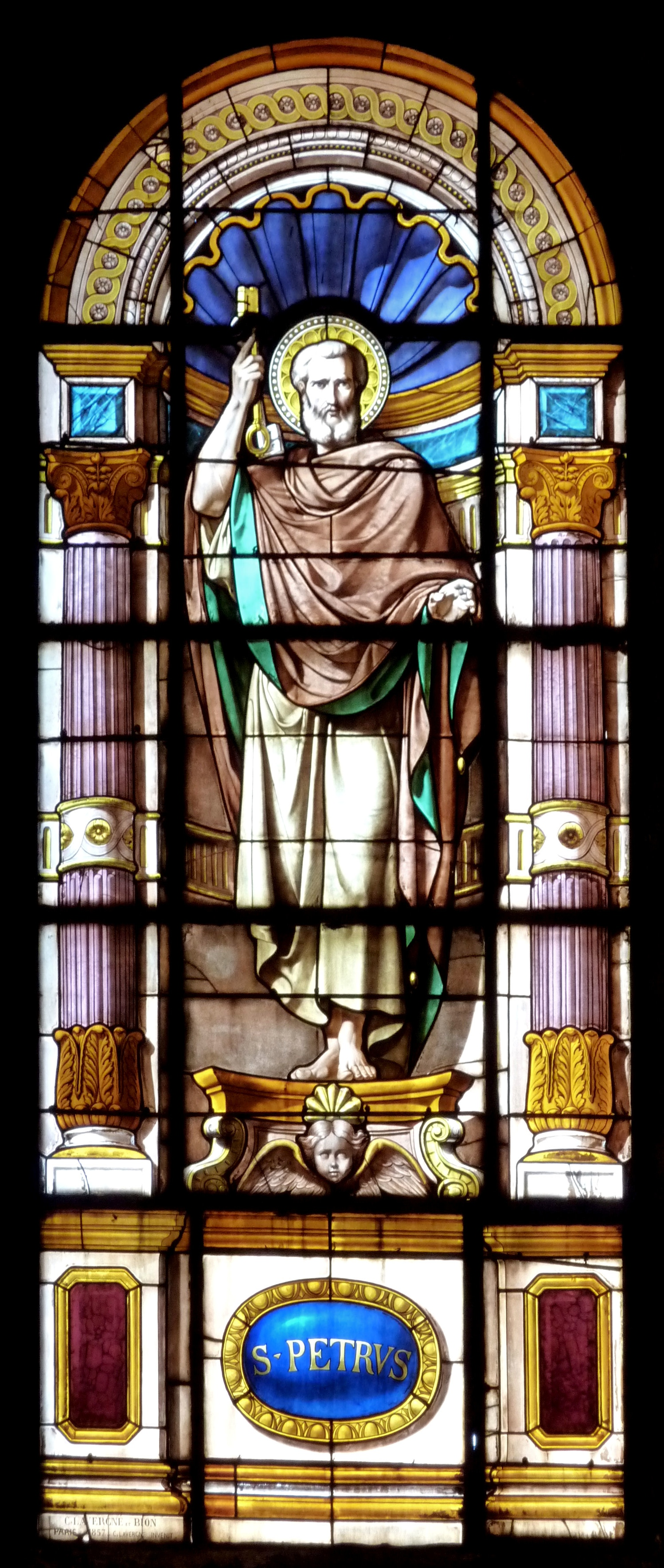
St.Peter, at the Hôpital Lariboisière

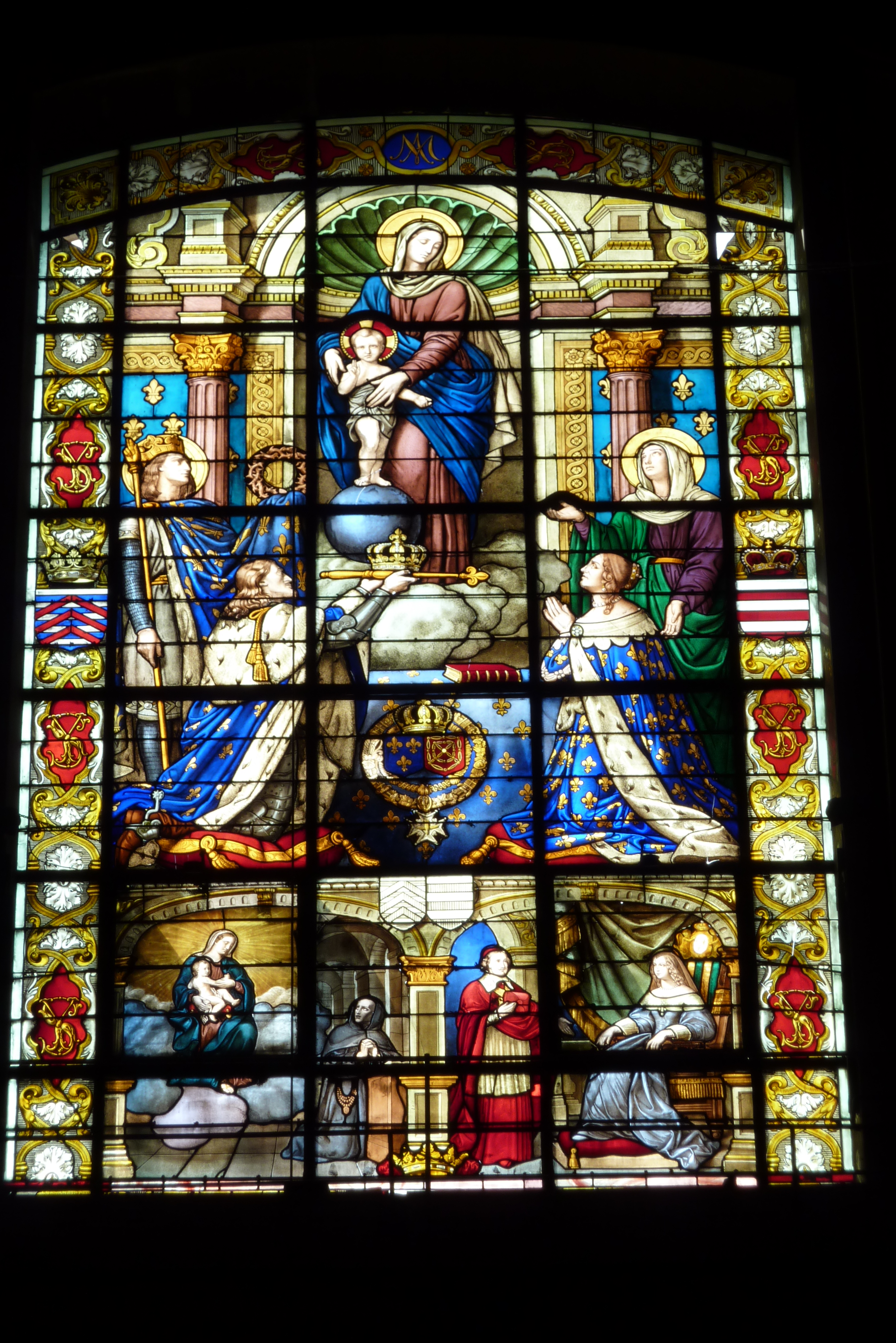
Notre-Dame-des-Victoires

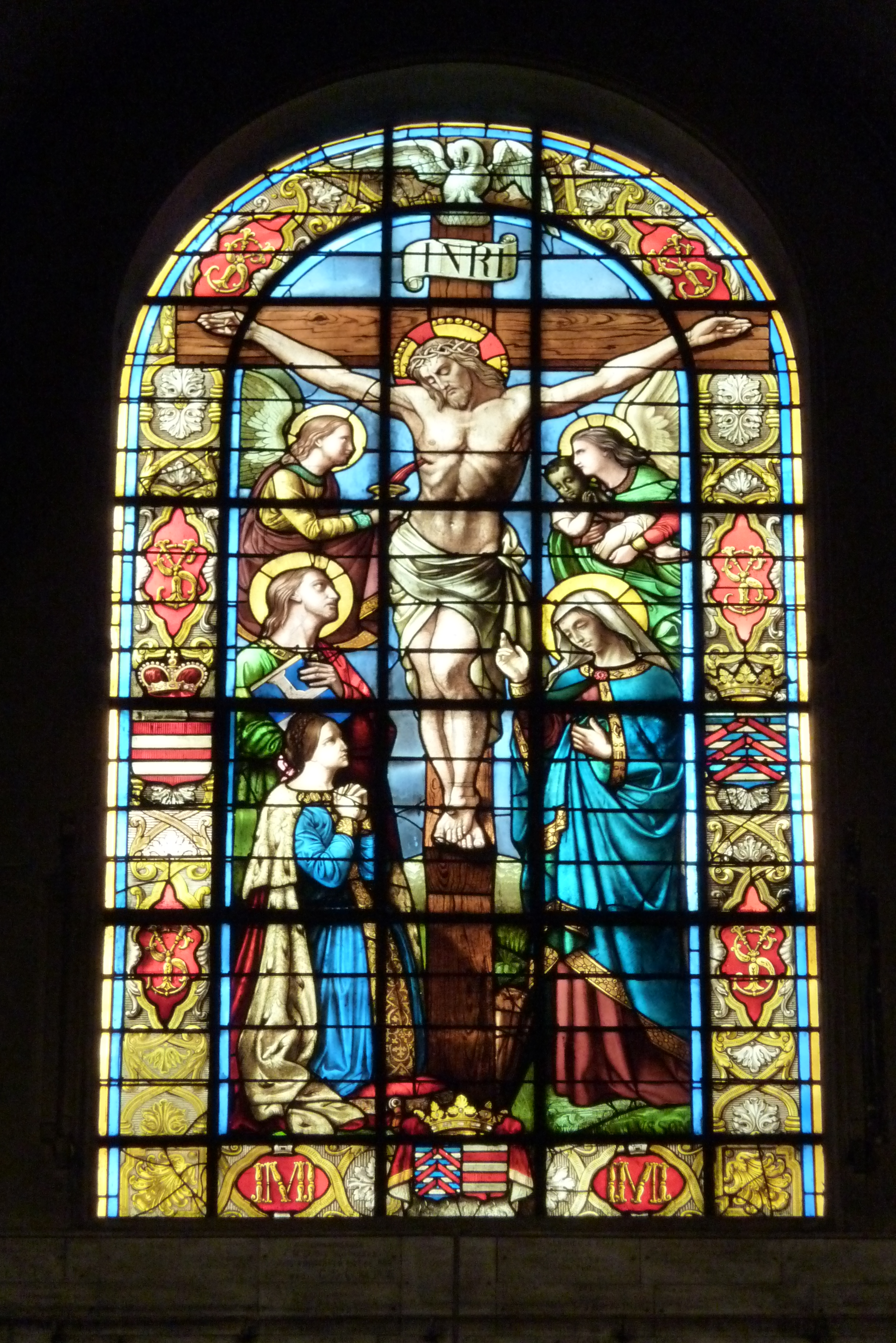
Notre-Dame-des-Victoires

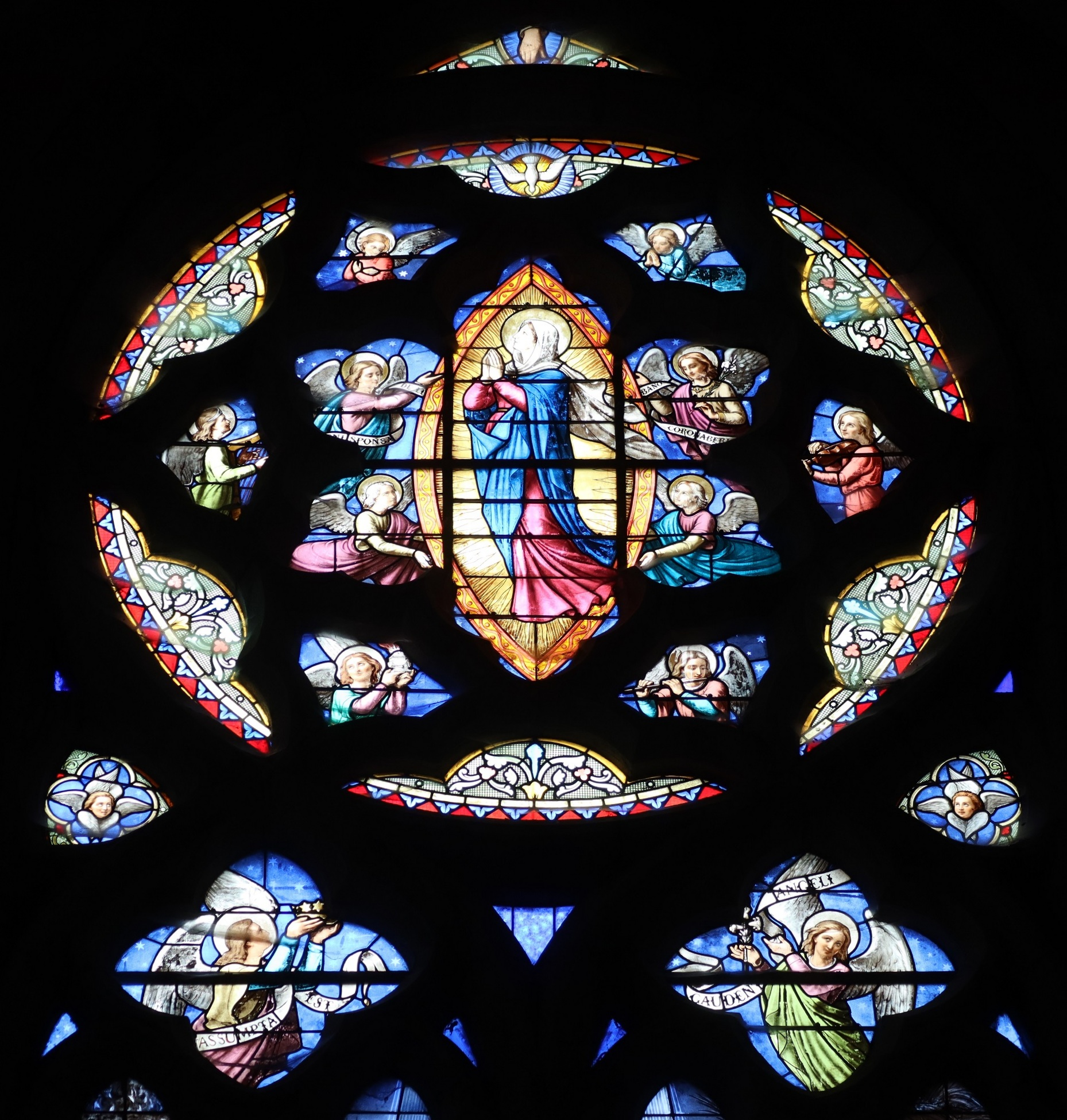
Église Notre-Dame, Combourg
