= Jean Seignemartin =

French painter

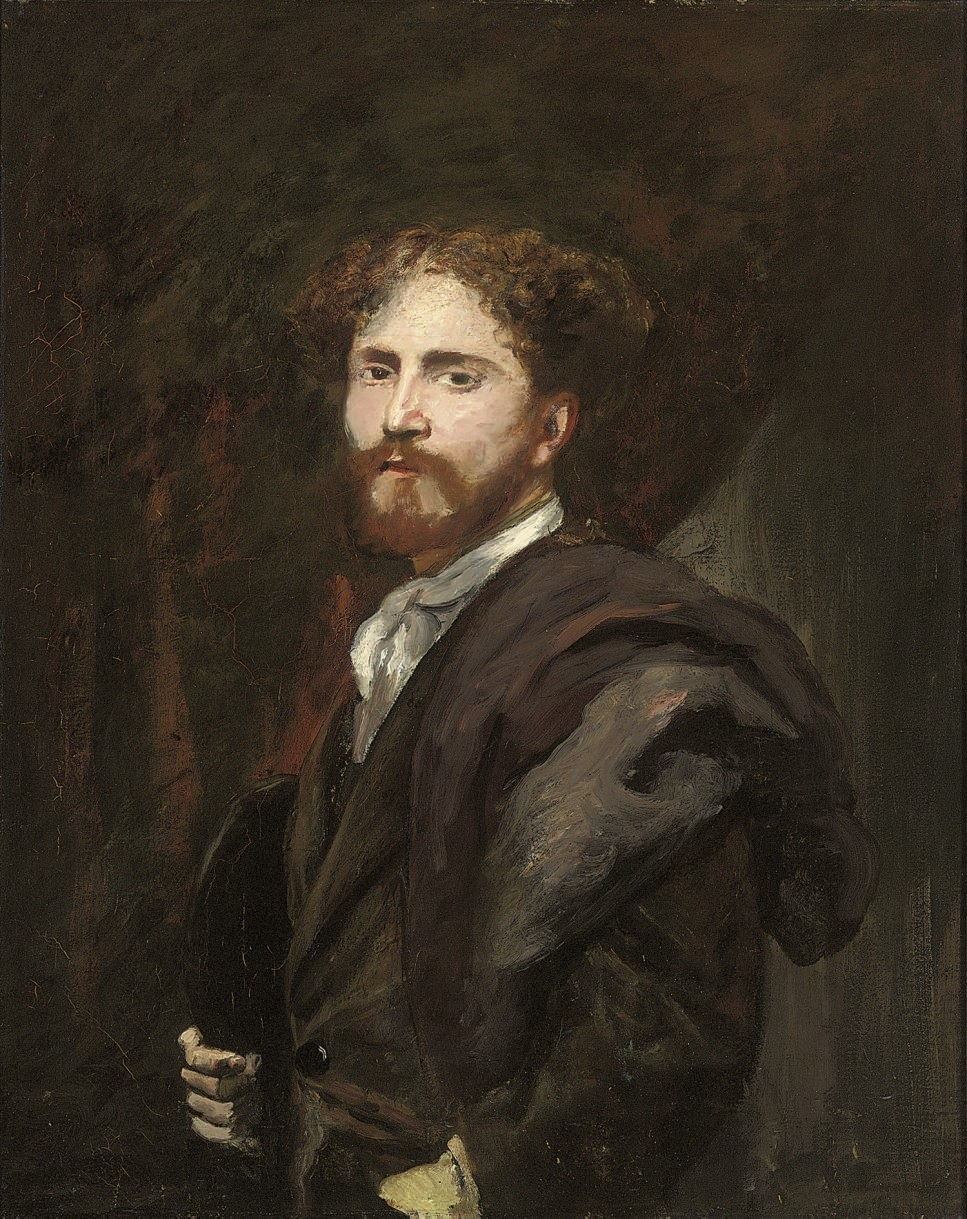
Self-portrait (date unknown)

Jean Seignemartin (16 April 1848 in Lyon – 29 November 1875 in Algiers) was a French painter of the Lyon School.

== Biography ==
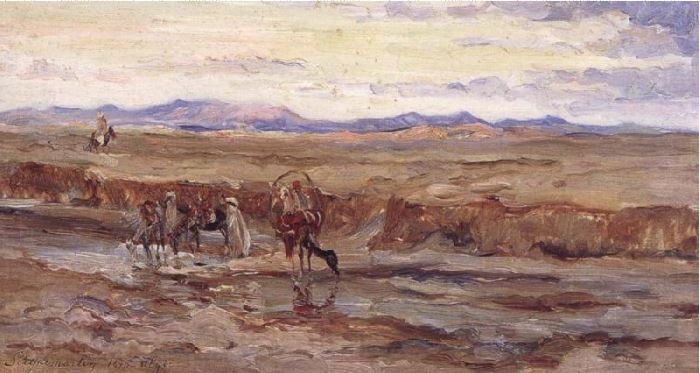
Winter in Southern Algeria

His father was a weaver. Having shown artistic talent, in 1860 he was enrolled at the École nationale des beaux-arts de Lyon, where he studied with Michel Philibert Genod and Joseph Guichard. He graduated in 1865 with the "Laurier d’or" and shared a studio with his friend, François Vernay.

In 1870, at the beginning of the Franco-Prussian War, he was drafted and assigned to a unit of pontonniers from Paris. This involved being almost constantly in the water (even during winter), which resulted in infections that led to tuberculosis.

After his return, he helped decorate Frigolet Abbey under the direction of Antoine Sublet. Later, he settled into his own studio in Lyon, where he attracted notable patrons such as Dr. Raymond Tripier and the banker R. Stengelin, father of the painter Alphonse Stengelin.

In 1874, he went to Algeria, accompanied by Doctor Tripier. There he met Albert Lebourg, a professor at the École supérieure des beaux-arts d'Alger, who had a major influence on his style. In spring of the following year, he returned to Lyon, but went back to Algeria shortly thereafter on the advice of his doctors. He died that winter. It took several weeks to arrange for the transport of his body, which was interred at the Cemetery of Loyasse. A public subscription was taken up to adorn his tomb with a bronze bust by Étienne Pagny.

He painted portraits, genre scenes and still lifes of flowers, but his paintings from Algeria are his best-known works. A street in the 8th arrondissement of Lyon is named after him.
