= Morillon =

Morillon may refer to:

== People ==
- Maximilien Morillon (1516–1586), French bishop
- Étienne Morillon (footballer) (fl. 1905–1929), French footballer
- Étienne Morillon (painter) (1884–1949), French painter and engraver
- Philippe Morillon (1935–2026), French general and politician

== Places ==
- Morillon, Haute-Savoie, Auvergne-Rhône-Alpes, France
- Saint-Morillon, Gironde, Nouvelle-Aquitaine, France

== Other ==
- Morillon, alternative name for 2 varieties of grape:
  - Chardonnay
  - Négrette
