= Étienne Morillon =

Étienne Morillon may refer to:

- Étienne Morillon (footballer), French footballer
- Étienne Morillon (painter) (1884–1949), French painter and engraver
