= Joseph Guichard =

French painter

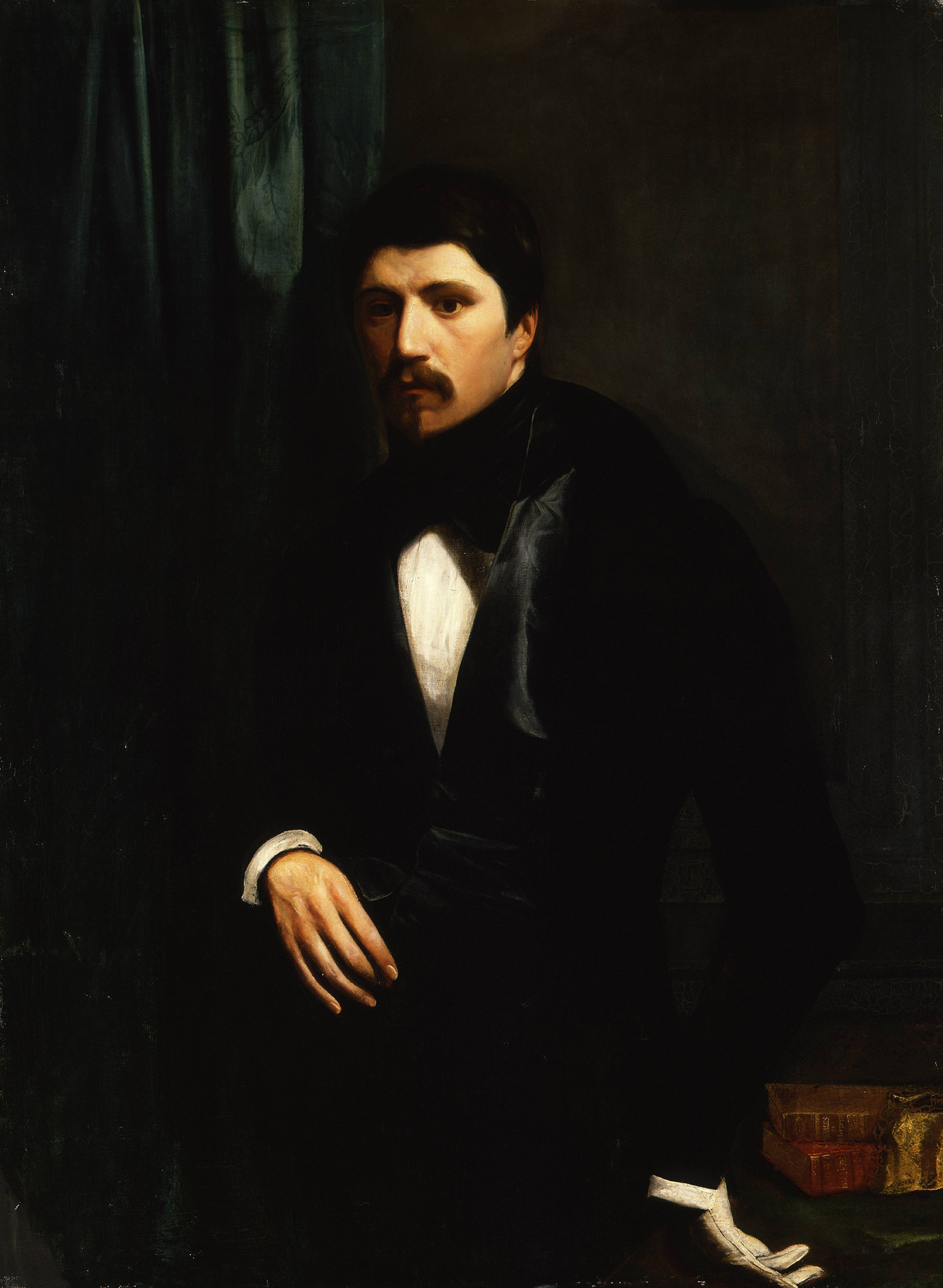
Self-portrait, Salon of 1833, musée des beaux-arts de Lyon

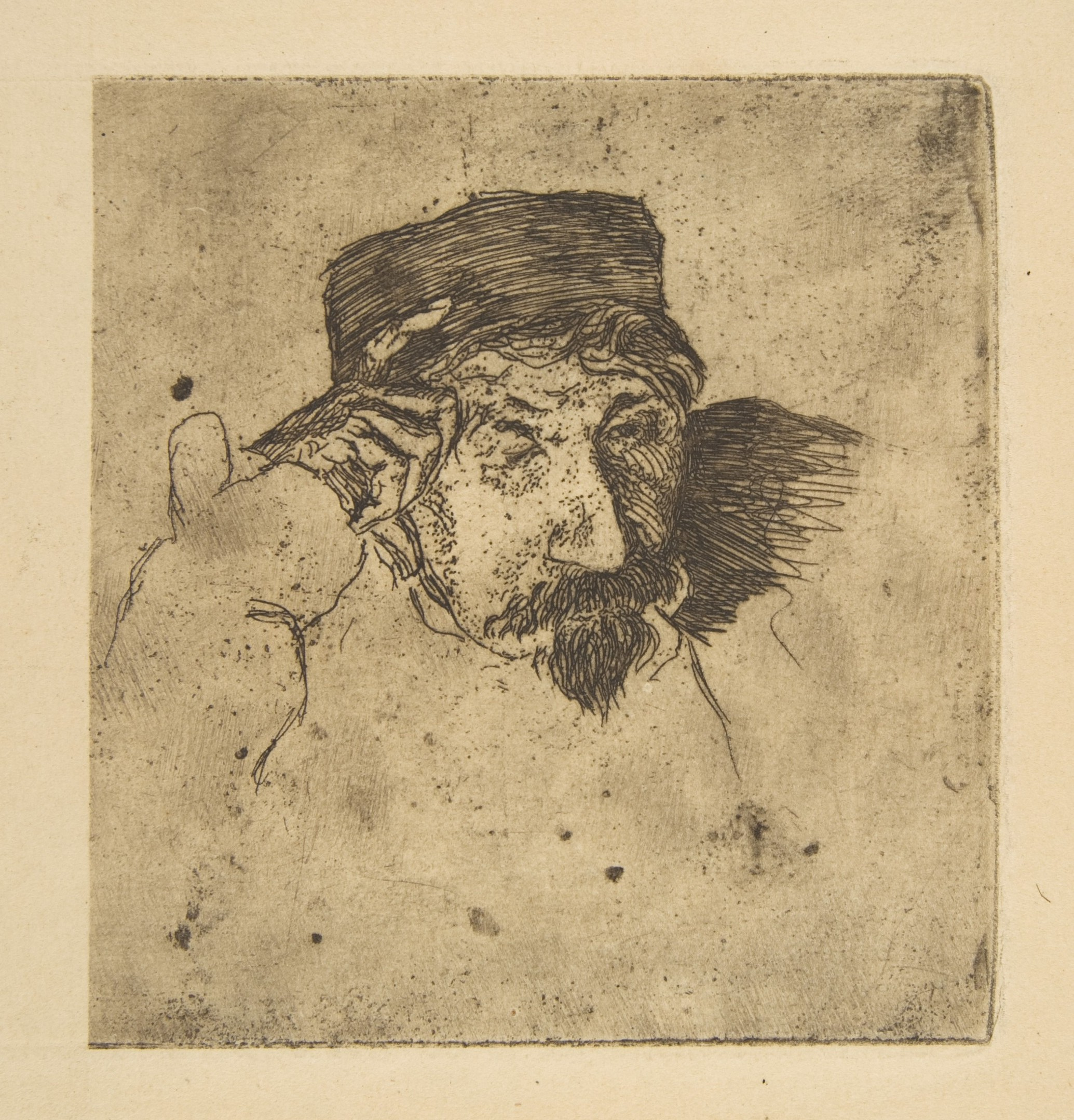
Joseph Guichard, sketch by Félix Bracquemond

Joseph Benoît Guichard (14 November 1806, Lyon - 31 May 1880, Lyon) was a French painter and art teacher who worked in a variety of styles.

== Biography ==
His parents were the owners of a wallpaper shop. Around 1818, he began to study drawing at the Palais Saint-Pierre (now the Museum of Fine Arts of Lyon) with the intention of becoming a draftsman. Many of his classes were taught in a strict Academic style by Pierre Révoil and Fleury François Richard. His first publicly displayed work was a picture of his grandmother. This formal style did not suit him, however. In 1824, he and a friend from school, Paul Chenavard, left the Palais and took classes from the sculptor, Jean-François Legendre-Héral instead.

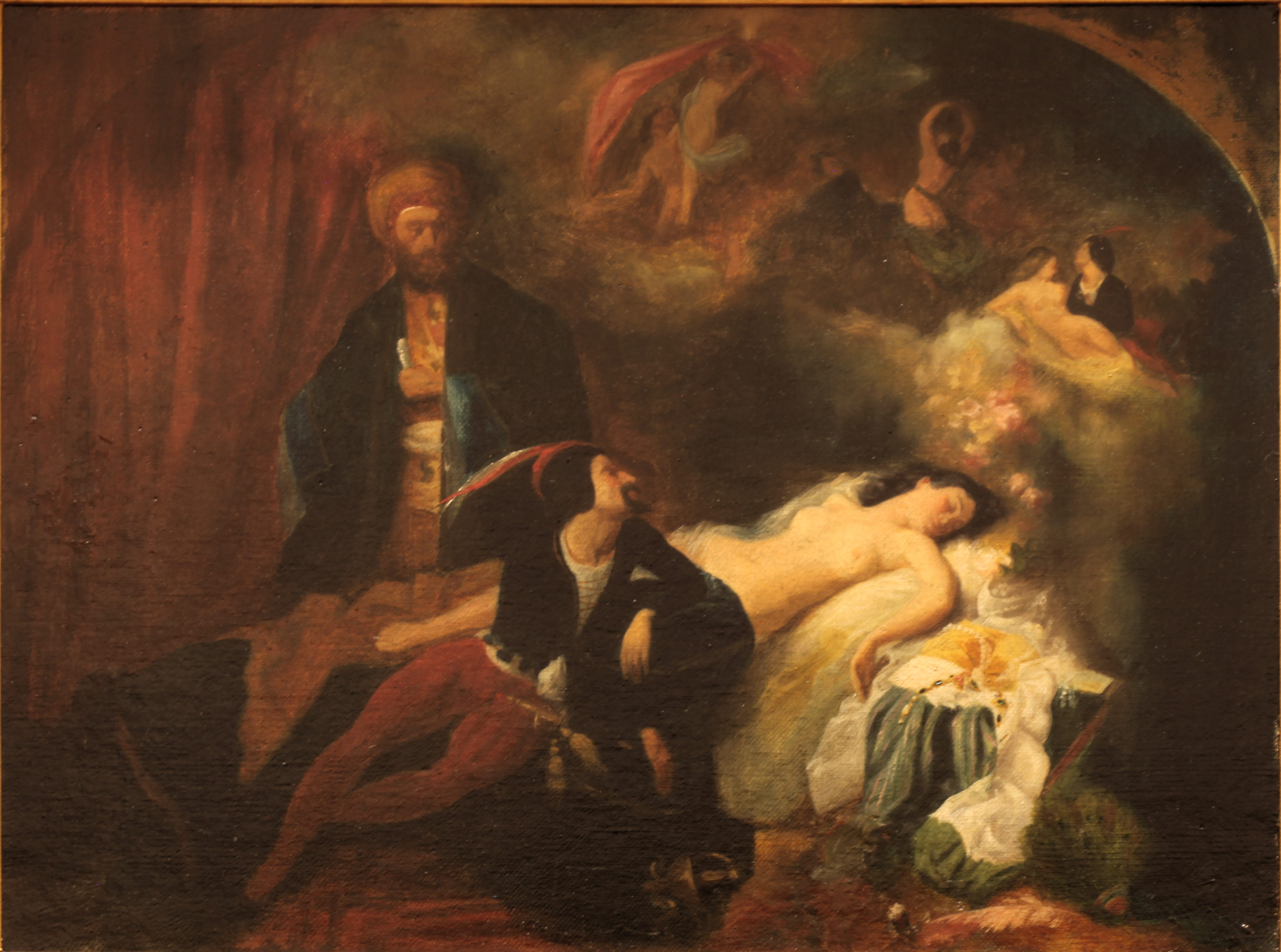
Dreams of Love

In 1827, he decided to go to Paris, where he met Hippolyte Flandrin and his brother, Paul Jean Flandrin. They helped him to enter the workshop of Jean-Auguste-Dominique Ingres, who emphasized the importance of drawing as the basis of all great art; extolling the beautiful lines of Raphael as opposed to the passionate colors of Rubens. This approach also proved dissatisfying so, when he became a student at the École des beaux-arts de Paris in 1828 and discovered Eugène Delacroix, he disavowed Ingres and painted without preliminary sketches; a practice he would follow throughout his life. Immediately after his debut at the Salon of 1831 Ingres, in his turn, disavowed Guichard. The showing was a success, however, and he obtained the patronage of the author, Auguste Jal, a distant relative.

In 1833, through his numerous connections, Guichard was able to meet with Adolphe Thiers, Minister of the Interior, who had plans for a museum that would display reproductions of works by the Old Masters, to expose them to the greatest possible number of people. Guichard was chosen to copy the "Descent from the Cross" by Daniele da Volterra. After a brief visit with his family in Lyon, he went to Rome. When he had completed the "Descent', he was assigned to copy The Triumph of Galatea by Raphaël. In the meantime, Guichard's former mentor, Ingres, had been named Director of the French Academy in Rome, replacing Horace Vernet, who had become a friend of Guichard's. To everyone's surprise, he approved of the work Guichard was doing. Upon returning to Paris, he was commissioned to do decorative paintings at several churches.

In 1839, he married Agathe Lagrenée (1815-1876); daughter of the painter Anthelme-François Lagrenée (1774-1832) and granddaughter of Louis-Jean-François Lagrenée; whom Vernet had introduced him to in Rome.

In 1850, he had the honor of painting alongside Delacroix, decorating the plafond in the Galerie d'Apollon at the Louvre. The following year, he was decorated with the Legion of Honor. In 1862, he was named Professor of the painting classes at the École des beaux-arts de Lyon, succeeding the late Michel Philibert Genod, and returned to his hometown.

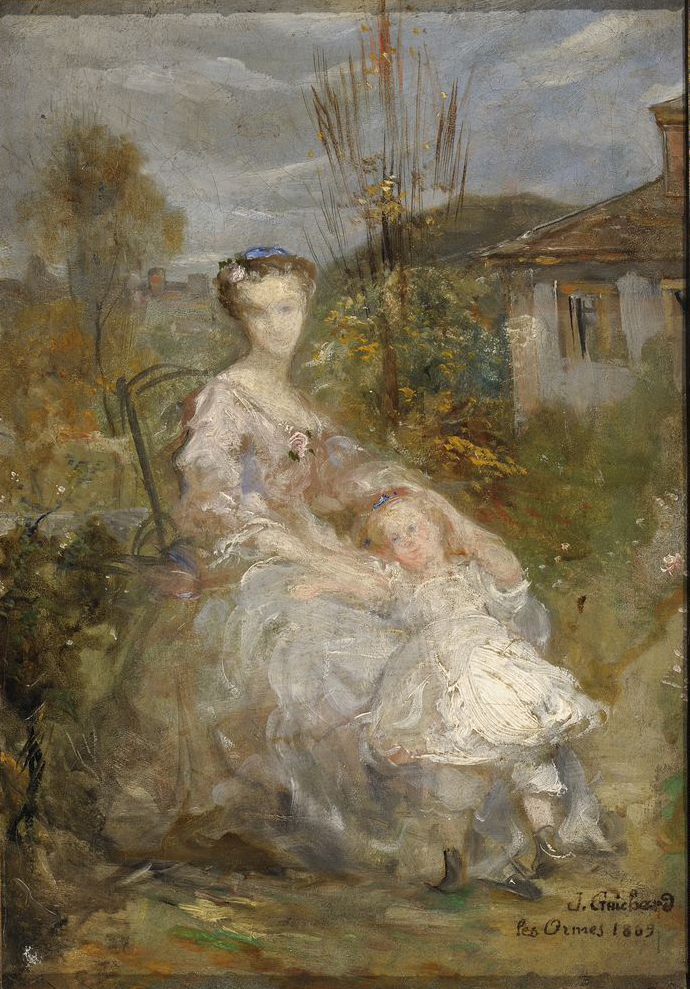
Louisa Siefert at Ormes

His style of teaching came under heavy criticism and, in 1871, he was suspended by Mayor Jacques-Louis Hénon. His old friend, Chenavard and the art critic Charles Blanc intervened on his behalf and he was named Director of the school by Jules Simon, Minister of Instruction in the Government of National Defense. Upon hearing this news, the other teachers went on strike and he was forced to resign. As a sop, he was put in charge of the municipal painting school. In 1879, he was named the curator at the Musée des beaux-arts de Lyon. During his tenure as a teacher, his students included Berthe Morisot, Germain Détanger, Félix Bracquemond, Alphonse Stengelin and Jean Seignemartin.

He died in 1880, following a short illness.
