= Alphonse Stengelin =

French painter

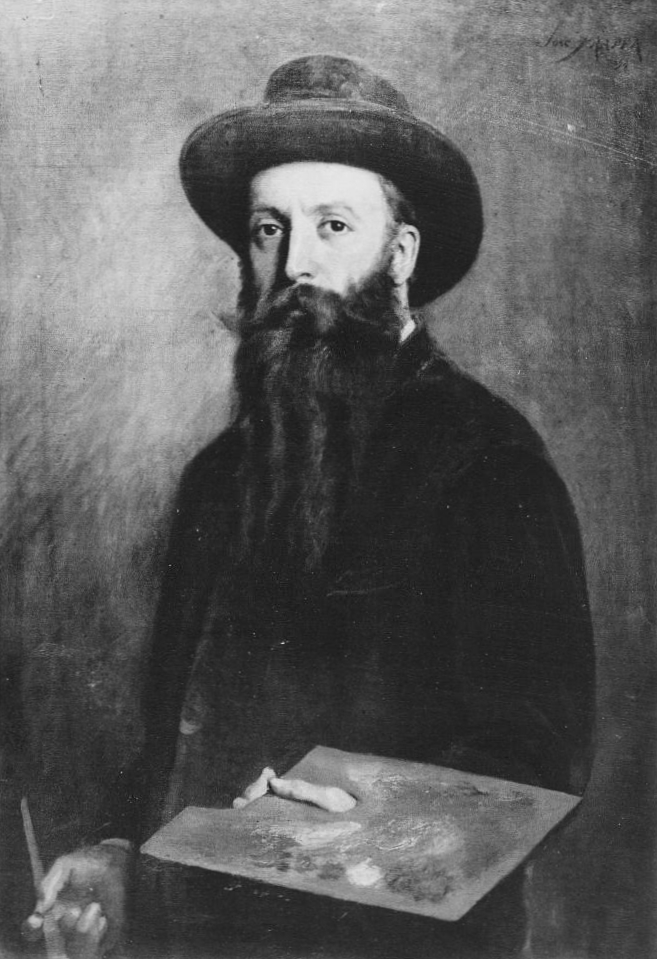
- Rotogravure by José Frappa from L'Œuvre d'art (1895)
- Born: 26 September 1852; Lyon, France
- Died: 12 March 1938 (aged 85); Satigny, Switzerland

Alphonse Stengelin (1852–1938) was a French painter, engraver, and lithographer who spent much of his life working outside France. He is remembered mostly for his landscapes.

== Biography ==
He was born in a home that had been designed by the architect Jacques-Germain Soufflot, designer of the Panthéon. His parents were Swiss. His father was a banker, associated with the banking house of Evesque & Cie.

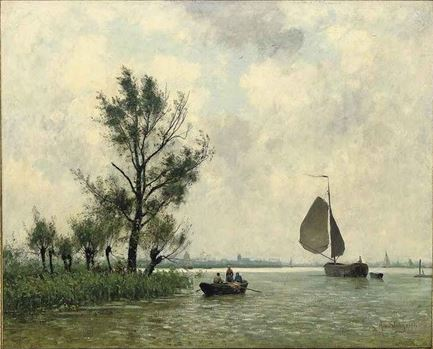
River with Boats

After studying at the Collège-lycée Ampère, he enrolled at the École des beaux-arts de Lyon and became a student of the school's Director, Joseph Guichard. He also worked with Augustin Chenu and Florian-Némorin Cabane (1831–1922), both landscape painters. He spent much of his time copying the Old Masters at the Musée des beaux-arts de Lyon and was a great admirer of Rembrandt.

He eventually went to Paris and opened a small studio in Montmartre. From 1875 to 1910 he travelled extensively, visiting Germany, Switzerland and Italy. As the years passed, he spent more time in the Netherlands, where he not only painted but also produced engravings of his earlier paintings. The small towns of Hooghalen and Katwijk and the farming country of Bresse were among his favorite locations.

In 1888, he married his cousin, Coraly Stengelin (1860–1945) and they had four children. A street in Katwijk was named after him in 1907, after which he signed his works as "Stengelin van Katwijk". Until 1914, he divided his time between the Netherlands and a small house in Écully. In 1978, a "Place Alphonse Stengelin" was dedicated there.

He died in 1938 in Switzerland, where he had gone to live with his brother, Henri.

His works may be seen at the Musée des beaux-arts de Lyon, Musée des beaux-arts de Bordeaux, Musée des beaux-arts de Marseille, the Dordrechts Museum and the Musée d'arts de Nantes.
