= Étienne Pagny =

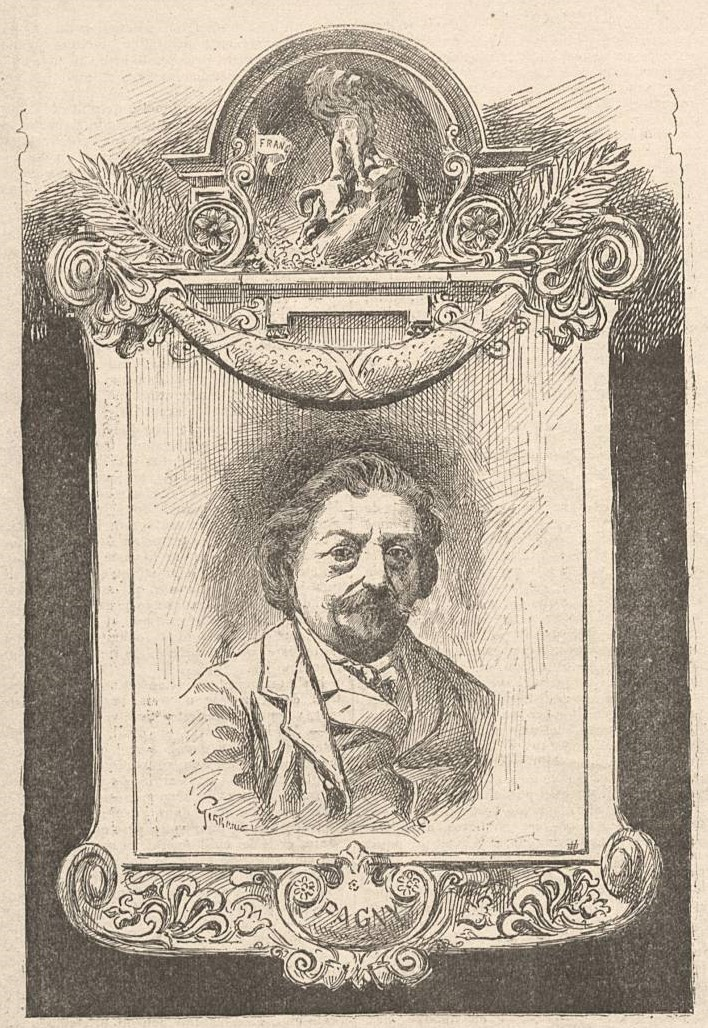
Étienne Pagny, by Gustave Girrane, from Le Progrès Illustré (1899)

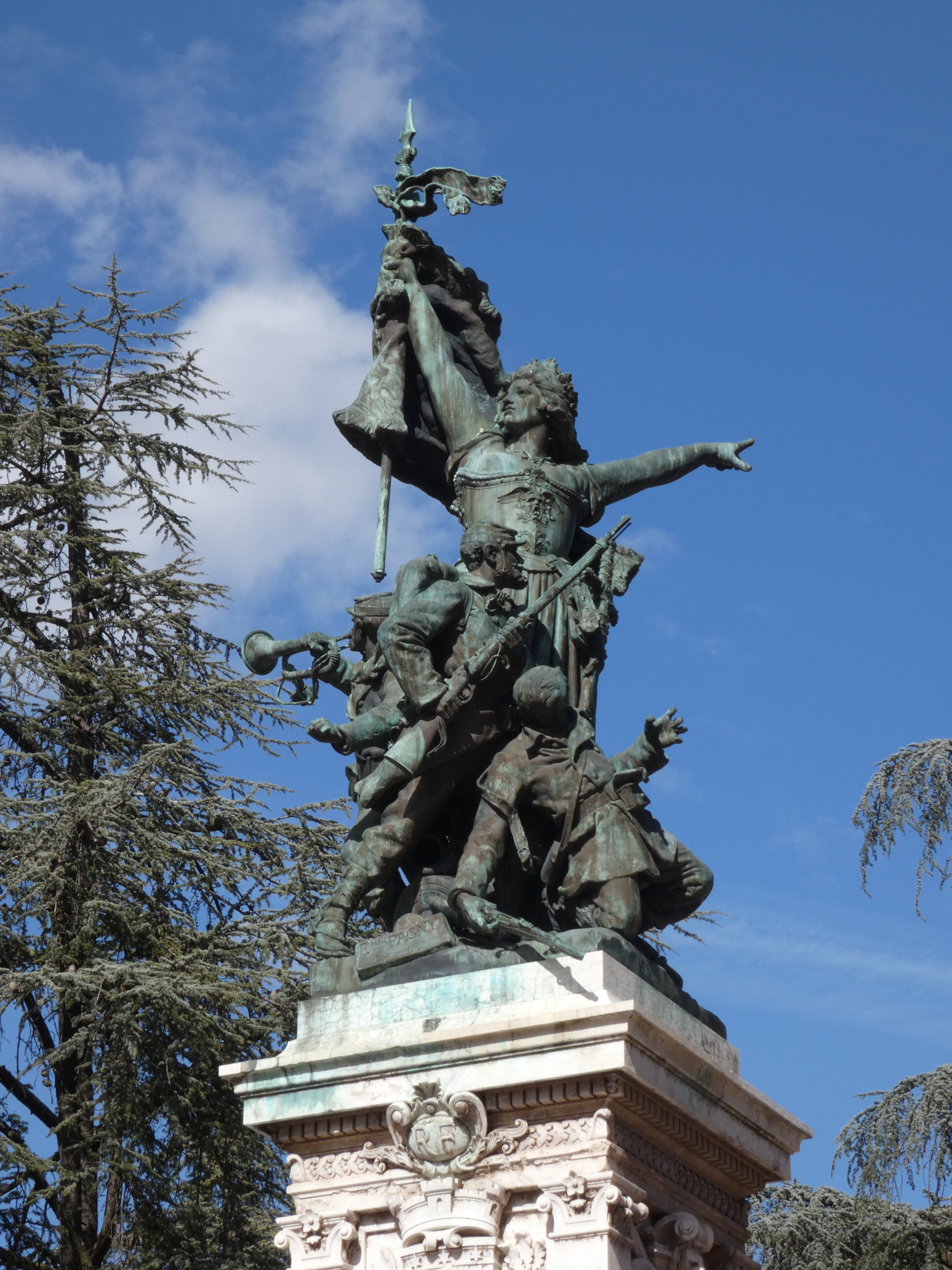
Monument des Enfants du Rhône

Étienne Pagny (29 October 1829, Lyon - 28 December 1898, Lyon) was a French sculptor, known primarily for decorative work and busts.

== Life and works ==
He was born to Jacques Pagny, a manufacturer of Tulle, and his wife Élizabeth, née Courbon, from Thèze. He began his studies at La Martinière College, where he originally studied architecture before deciding to become a sculptor. In pursuit of that goal, he enrolled at the École nationale supérieure des beaux-arts de Lyon. He was there from 1847 to 1849. His teachers included Guillaume Bonnet and Joseph-Hugues Fabisch. Upon completing his courses, he went to Paris and took a position in the studios of François Félix Roubaud.

He was there for only a short time when he was conscripted to serve with the forces of General Nicolas-Charles Oudinot, during the First Italian War of Independence. While in Rome, he made use of what spare time he had studying the Italian masterpieces. When his service was completed, rather than return to Paris, he went home to Lyon where, until 1873, he worked with his old teacher, Bonnet. Some, including the painter Joseph Guichard, felt that Pagny was subordinating his talents to Bonnet who, in fact, kept no records of Pagny's contributions. It is known, however, that he worked on the Église Saint-Pierre-aux-Liens de Vaise and the Hôtel de Ville, as he worked together with Charles Dufraine, another of Bonnet's students.

Following Bonnet's death in 1873, Pagny set up his own studio, where he created several religious groups and numerous busts. In 1877, he was awarded third prize in a competition for decorating the Théâtre des Célestins, and received a commission to create three portrait sculptures for the façade; Victor Hugo, Alfred de Musset and Eugène Scribe.

His most important work came shortly after, when he won a competition to provide the main grouping for a monument honoring the legionnaires and guards from Lyon who participated in the Franco-Prussian War. Inaugurated in 1887, it is commonly known as the "Monument des enfants du Rhône", and is located at the entrance to the Parc de la Tête d'or.

He died at the age of sixty-nine after a long and painful illness.
