= Adrien Bas =

French painter

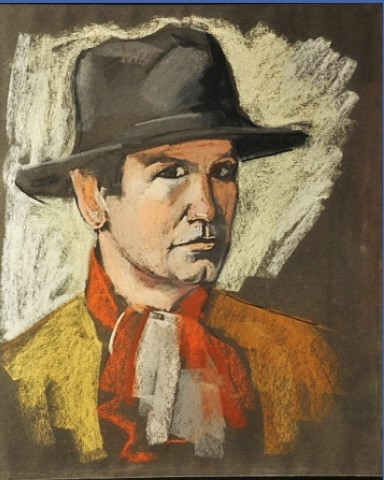
Self-portrait (date unknown)

Adrien Bas (16 April 1884, in Lyon – 2 May 1925, in Lyon) was a French painter and pastellist. He was primarily known for landscapes, but also painted flowers, still-lifes, interiors and some portraits.

== Biography ==
His father was a weaver. He began his art studies at the École nationale supérieure des beaux-arts de Lyon in the workshop of Pierre Bonnaud. Except for some study trips and travels related to his health, he lived in Lyon his entire life.

In 1908, he obtained honorable mention at the "Salon lyonnais des beaux-arts". After 1916, his works were largely inspired by Paul Cézanne, although he also admired Auguste Renoir. During the latter part of World War I, he stayed in Vence. Upon his return, he gained the patronage of the writer, sculptor and art dealer, Renaud Icard, who became his principal agent.

In 1920, he participated in a major exhibit at the "Salon d'automne de Lyon" (modeled after the Salon d'automne of Paris), with a group of artists that included Louis Bouquet, Pierre Combet-Descombes, Étienne Morillon, the sculptor Marcel Gimond, and many others who were opposed to Academicism. Shortly after, they were joined by the sculptor Georges Salendre and the writer, Gabriel Chevallier, creating a society known as "Les Ziniars", that was active until 1924. Shortly before his death, he participated in the creation of the "Salon du Sud-Est".

He died of tuberculosis at his home on the Île Barbe. After his death, his works were promoted by his friend, the writer Henri Béraud.

== Selected works ==
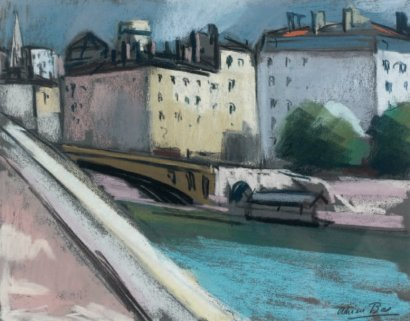
The Banks of the Rhône

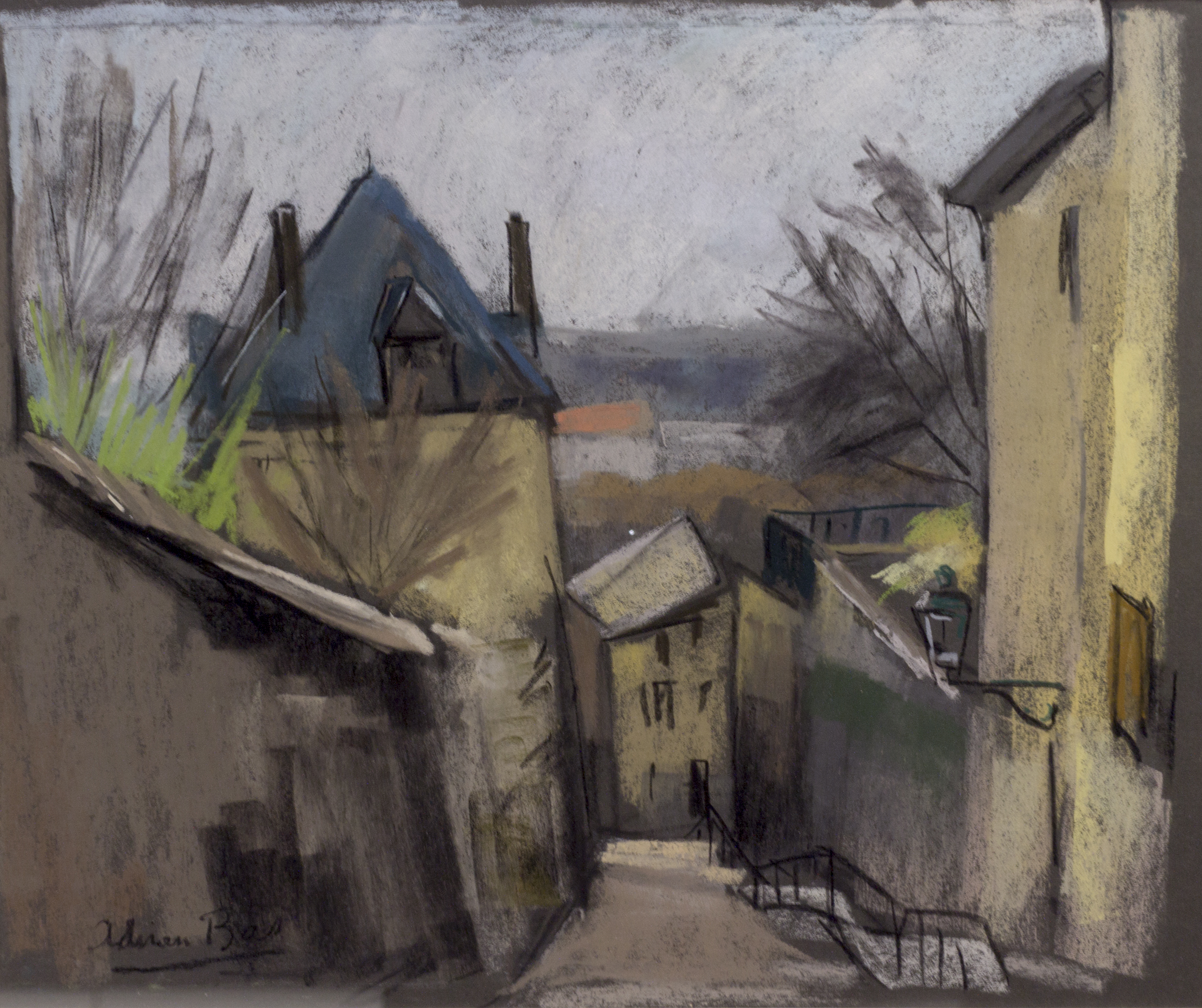
Stairs in Lyon

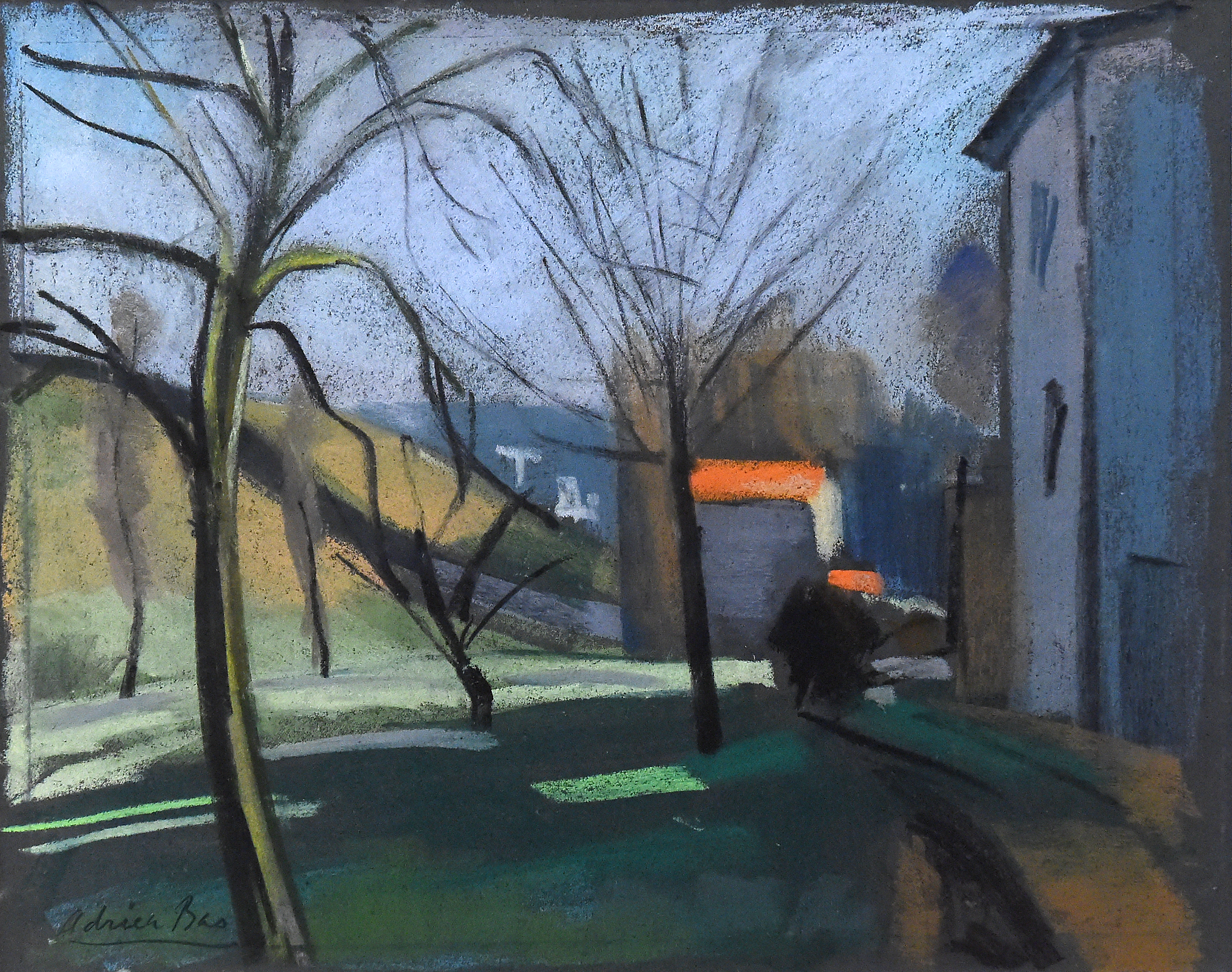
Spring with a Red Roof

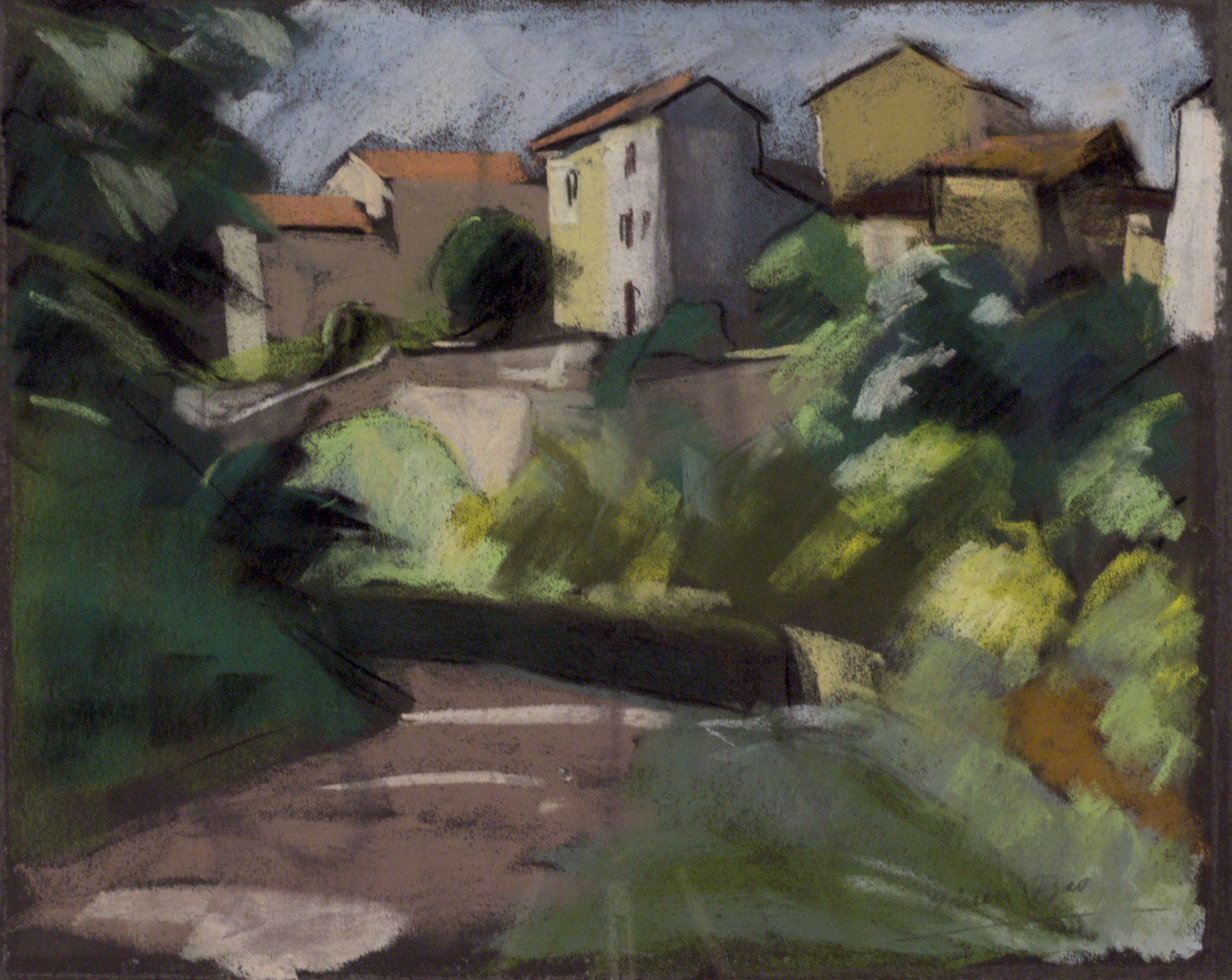
Hamlet in the Monts d'Or
