= Portrait of Paul Chenavard =

1869 painting by Gustave Courbet

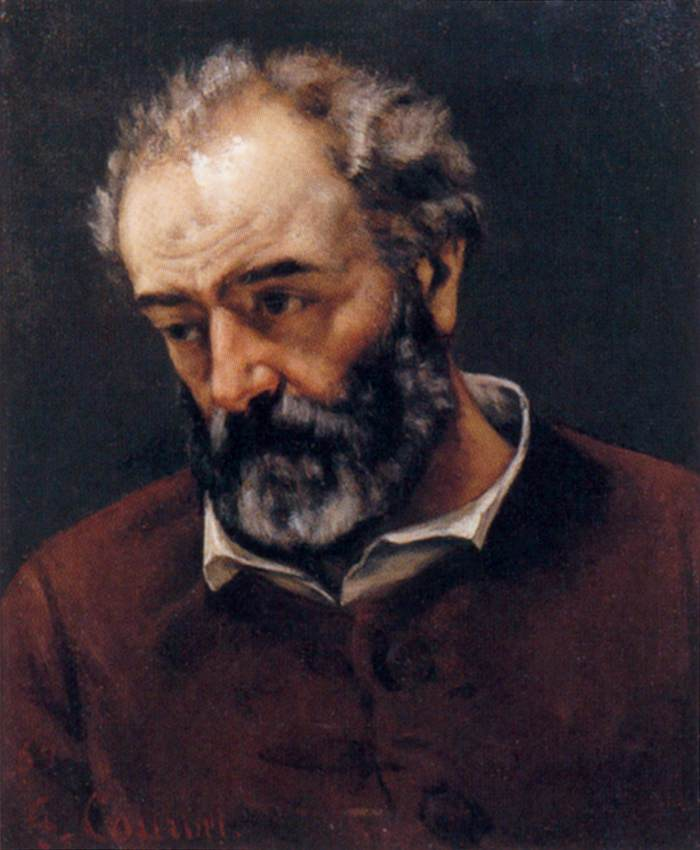
- Artist: Gustave Courbet
- Year: 1869
- Medium: oil on canvas
- Dimensions: 54 cm × 46 cm (21 in × 18 in)
- Location: Museum of Fine Arts of Lyon, Lyon

Portrait of Paul Chenavard is an 1869 oil-on-canvas portrait by the French Realist painter Gustave Courbet, showing his friend and fellow artist Paul Chenavard aged 62. It was probably produced in Munich during Chenavard's exhibition of The Divine Tragedy, which he had produced for the Panthéon but which had hit difficulties. The portrait is now in the Musée des Beaux-Arts de Lyon.
