= Église Saint-Théodore =

Coordinates: 43.3003°N 5.3762°E

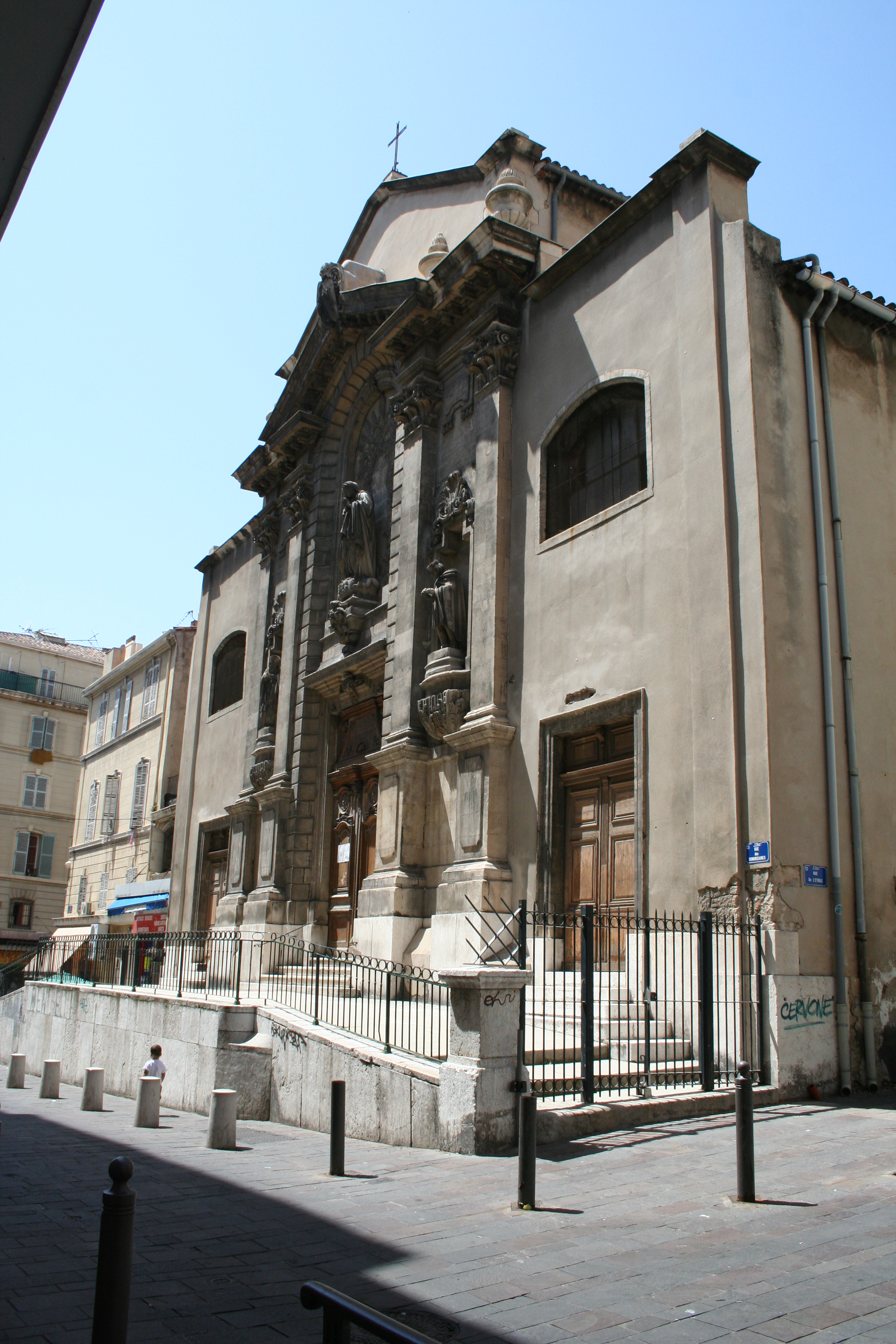
- Facade of the Église Saint-Théodore
- Église Saint-Théodore
- Location: 3 rue des Dominicaines; Marseille 13001; Bouches-du-Rhône, Provence-Alpes-Côte d'Azur
- Country: France
- Denomination: Roman Catholic

History
- Dedicated: October 21, 1648

Architecture
- Heritage designation: Monument historique
- Architectural type: church
- Style: Baroque

Administration
- Diocese: Roman Catholic Archdiocese of Marseille

The Église Saint-Théodore is a Roman Catholic church in Marseille, France.

== Location ==
It is located in the 1st arrondissement of Marseille. The exact address is 3 rue des Dominicaines, with its rear at 1 rue de l'Etoile.

== History ==
The church building was constructed in the Baroque style in the 17th century. It was dedicated by Étienne de Puget, who served as the bishop of Marseille from 1644 to his death in 1668, on October 21, 1648, in honour of Saint Louis, who served as the king of France from 1226 to 1270. It served as the chapel of a convent of Recollects, a Reform branch of the Franciscans. The facade was destroyed during the French Revolution of 1789–1799.

After the Concordat of 1801, it became a parish church in 1802 and was named in honour of Saint Theodore of Marseille, who served as the Bishop of Marseille from 582 to 591. The statues on the new facade were designed in 1857: they represent the Virgin Mary, Saint Louis and Saint Theodore.

Inside, the decor is entirely baroque. The vault was painted by Antoine Sublet (1821-1897) from 1860 to 1863. Jean-Baptiste Gault (1595-1643), who served as the Bishop of Marseille from 1640 to 1643, was buried in the church, where his tomb can be found in a side altar. The Holy water fonts are sculpted with cherubs and the insignia of the Recollets.

The casing of the pipe organ depicts Christophe Andrault de Langeron (1680-1768), an aristocrat who was the supervisor of galleys during the Great Plague of Marseille, in charge of taking diseased bodies out of boats and hampering the spread of the disease. As the Recollets forbid pipe organs in their churches, Pope Benedict XIV issued a papal bull to allow it. In 1890, François Mader made a new pipe organ for the church (though the casing was preserved), and it was restored by Ets Michel-Merklin & Kuhn in 1934. In 1997, thanks for the patronage of the Order of the Holy Sepulchre, it was restored by Thierry Lestrez.

Behind the high altar is displayed a large painting entitled L'embarquement de saint Louis pour la croisade by Jacques-Antoine Beaufort (1721–1784). Additional paintings displayed inside the church are Saint Jérôme au désert Francisco de Zurbarán (1598–1664), Le Jugement and Le martyre de sainte Barbe by François Puget (1651-1707), L'Annonciation by Louis Finson (1575–1617), and more paintings by Michel Serre (1658-1733).

The church building is listed as a monument historique. Recently, it has been the host of concerts to raise funds for its restoration.

== Gallery ==
Église Saint-Théodore
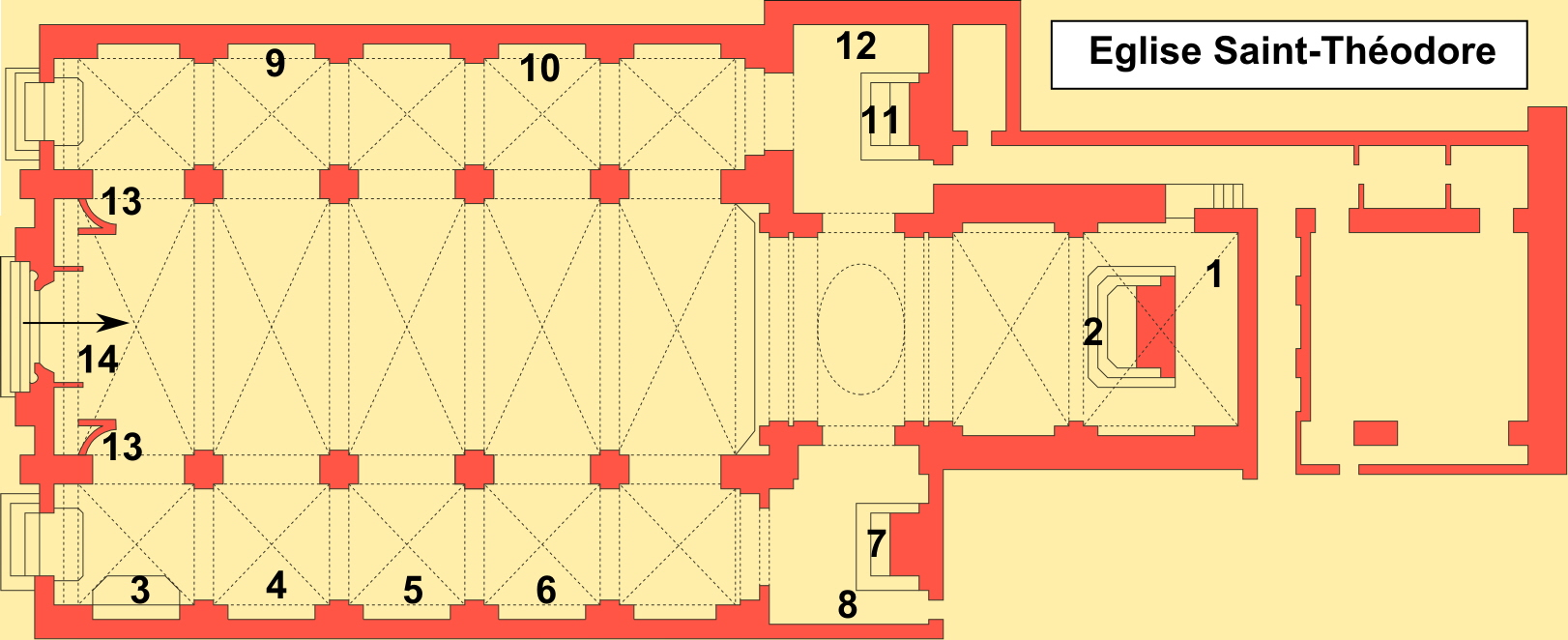
Map of the church

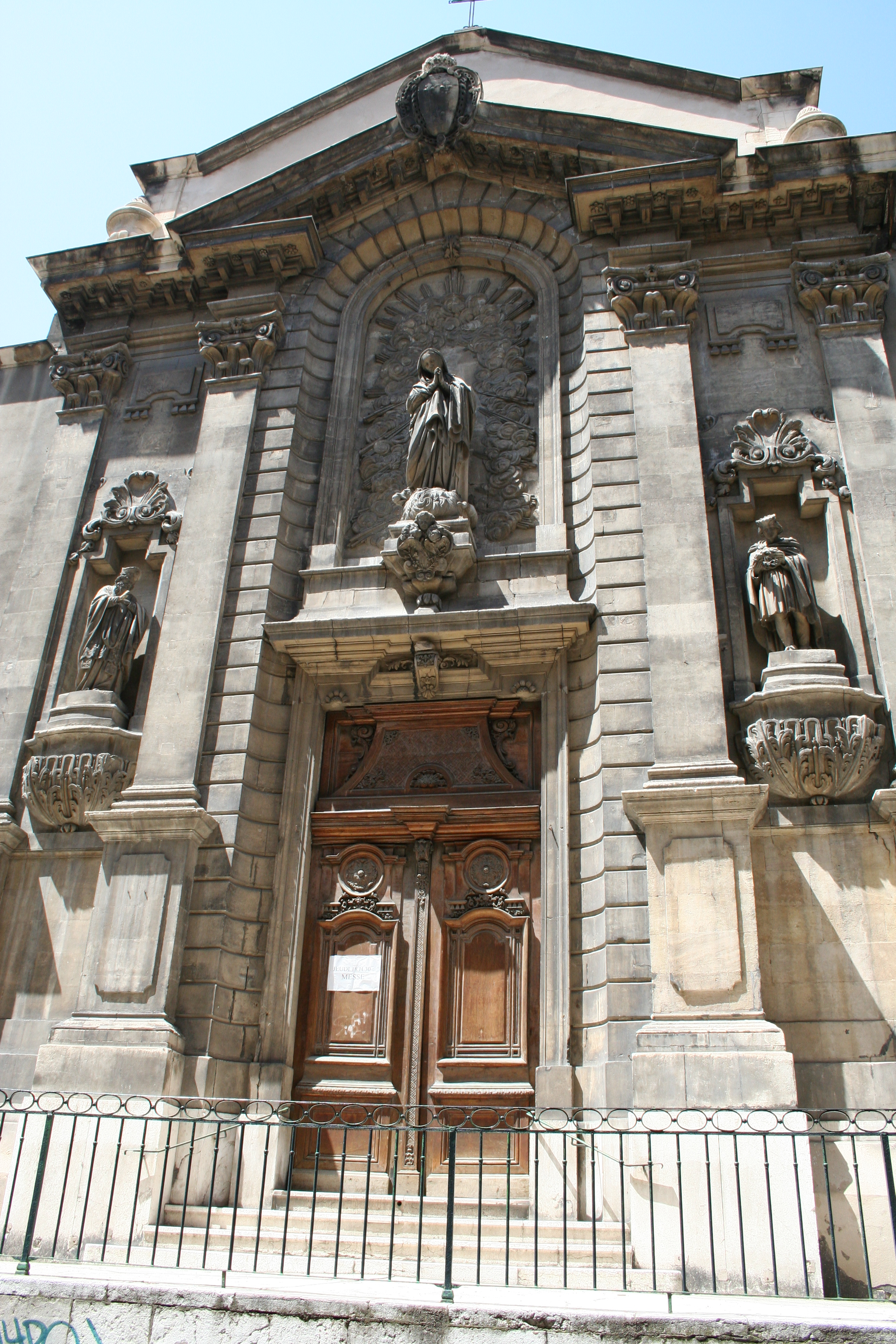
Facade of the Église Saint-Théodore

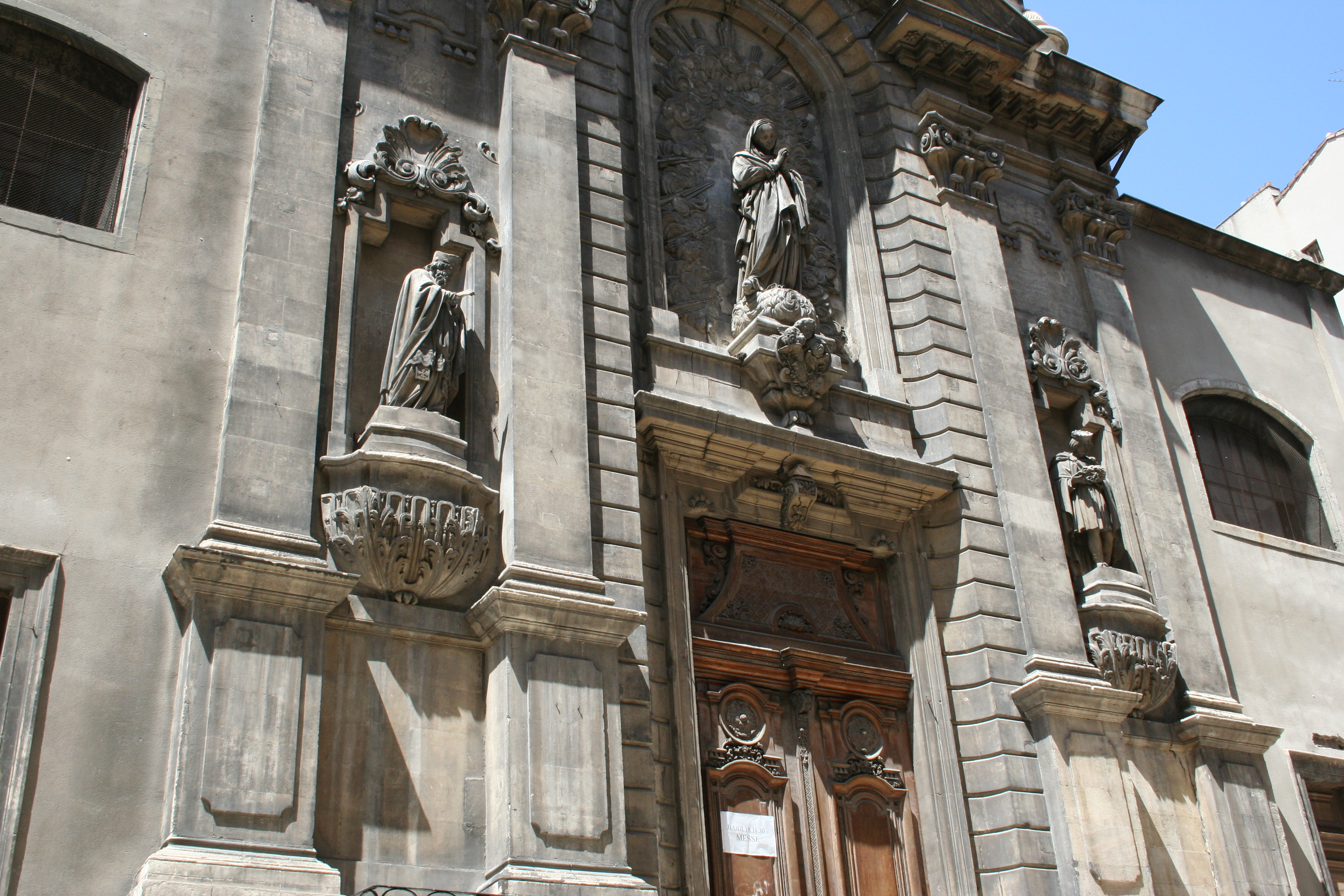
Close-up of the facade of the Église Saint-Théodore
