= Théophile Silvestre =

French art historian and critic

Théophile Sylvestre
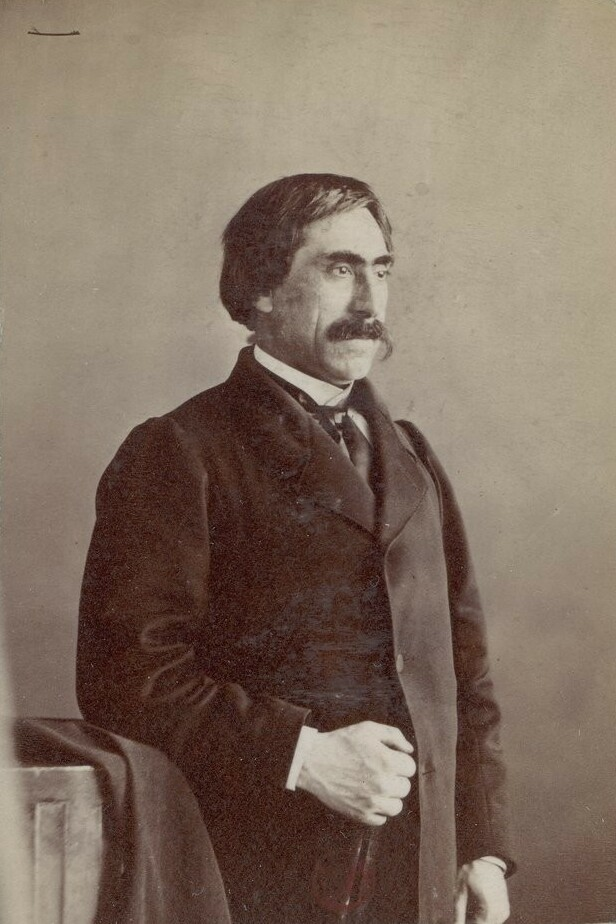
- Born: Simon Clément Louis Théophile Silvestre; 12 October 1823; Le Fossat, Ariège, France
- Died: 20 June 1876 (aged 52); Paris, France

Simon Clément Louis Théophile Silvestre (12 October 1823 – 20 June 1876) was a French art historian and critic. He is known for creating History of Living Artists, French and Foreign: Studies from Nature, a collection of contemporaneous biographical studies of European artists of the mid-19th century.

== Early life and education ==
Théophile Silvestre He was born on 12 October 1823 in Le Fossat, Ariège, France, to a bourgeois Catholic family. He was the son of the tax collector of Artigat.

He studied at the seminary in Pamiers. He then studied medicine in Toulouse, law in Paris and attended courses at the École Nationale des Chartes. Silvestre was appointed but not installed as sous-commissaire of Saint-Girons, Ariège. He was installed commissaire adjoint of Ariège on 5 April 1848, and resigned the next day. While he was a committed republican during the Revolution of 1848, he later became aligned with the Second French Empire.

== Critic and historian ==
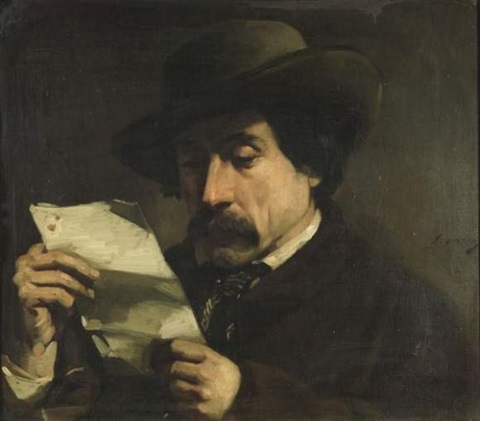
Portrait of Silvestre by Philippe-Auguste Jeanron

In 1852, Silvestre began writing History of Living Artists, French and Foreign: Studies from Nature (French: l'Histoire des artistes vivants, français et étrangers, études d’après nature), a collection of biographical studies of living painters, sculptors, architects, engravers, photographers and composers. The work was published in a series of booklets beginning in 1853. Silvestre commissioned photographers Édouard Baldus and Henri Le Secq to produce portraits of his subjects and reproductions of their work to include in his studies.

The first series, in order of appearance in the 1856 edition, included profiles of Jean-Auguste-Dominique Ingres, Eugène Delacroix, Jean-Baptiste-Camille Corot, Paul Chenavard, Alexandre Gabriel Decamps, Antoine-Louis Barye, Narcisse Virgilio Díaz, Gustave Courbet, Antoine-Augustin Préault, and François Rude. The second series, which began publication in 1857, stopped after only the first issue on Horace Vernet who sued Silvestre to stop him from continued publication of Vernet's letters.

== Later life and death ==
Silvestre died on 20 June 1876 in Paris at the home of Léon Gambetta, following a lunch marking their reconciliation.
