= Camille Bouvagne =

French painter

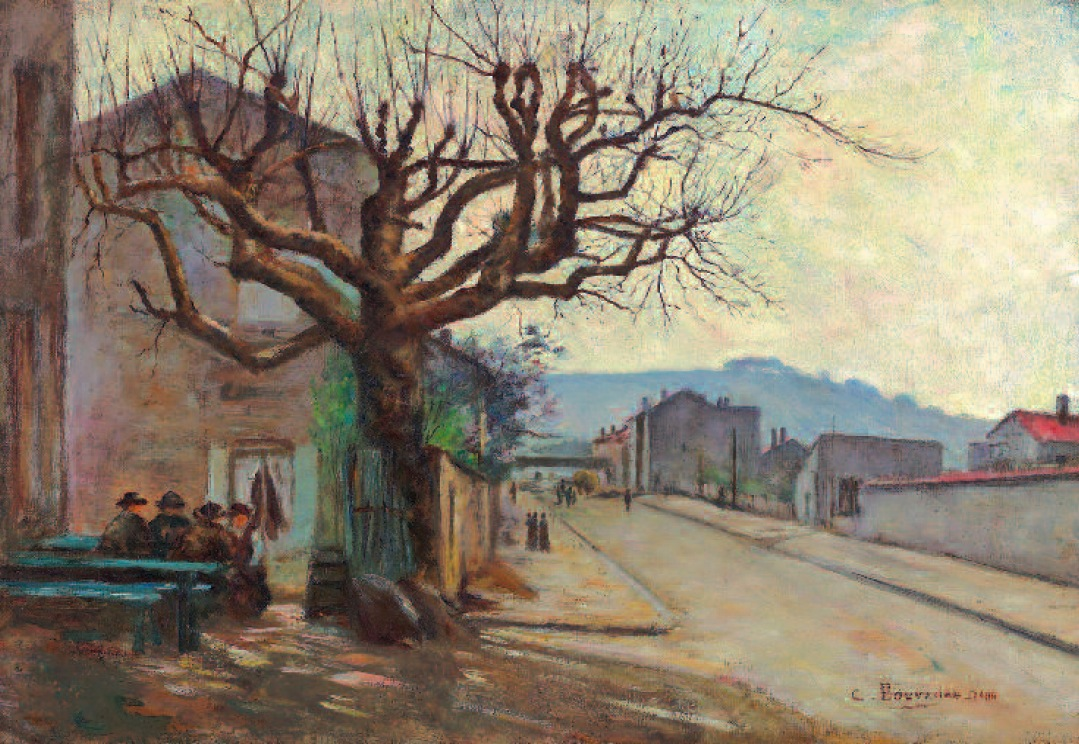
- Le Bistrot, oil on canvas, 40 x 55 cm
- Born: Jean-Baptiste Camille Bouvagne; 1864
- Died: 1936 (aged 71–72)
- Known for: Painting
- Notable work: Raisins (1906), Nature morte (1903), Fleurs et fruits (1900), Perdrix et choux (1889)
- Movement: Realism, Impressionism

Camille Bouvagne (born Jean-Baptiste Camille Bouvagne) (1864–1936) was a French painter from Lyon, France. A member of the Lyon School (L'École de Lyon or École lyonnaise), Bouvagne exhibited regularly at the Le Salon in Lyon (Salon de la Société Lyonnaise des Beaux-Arts).

== Œuvre ==
Bouvagne, a keen observer of nature, specialized in landscape and still life painting. His style remains split between classical Impressionism and Post-Impressionism; thin, relatively small, yet visible brush strokes, exhibiting an accurate depiction of light and colors that took precedence over lines and contours. Following the example of painters such as Jean-Baptiste-Camille Corot, Bouvagne's palette is restrained, dominated by browns, blacks and silvery green, his brushstrokes carefully controlled.

== Career ==
Camille Bouvagne studied at the École des Beaux-Arts de Lyon (École nationale des beaux-arts de Lyon) under Pierre Miciol (French, 1833–1905), who was a former student of the French academic painter Jehan Georges Vibert (1840–1902) and the first co-president of the Société Lyonnaise des Beaux Arts.

== Selected exhibitions and works ==
Le Salon, 1914, Lyon (Salon de la Société Lyonnaise des Beaux-Arts)

- Chrysanthèmes jaunes. Purchased by the Société des Anciens Elèves de l'Ecole des Beaux-Arts

Le Salon, 1909, Lyon

- les Cerises (n. 116)
- les Pêches (n. 117)

Le Salon, 1906 (Lyon)

- Faisan, nature mort (n. 92)
- Raisins (n. 93). Purchase by the Société des anciens élèves de l'École des Beaux-Arts

Le Salon, 1904 (Lyon)

- Gibiers (n. 86)

Le Salon, 1903 (Lyon)

- Nature morte (n. 84). Purchased by La Ville de Lyon

Le Salon, 1900 (Lyon)

- Fleurs et fruits (n. 91)

Salon de Bellecour, 25 February 1889, Société Lyonnaise des Beaux-Arts

- Nature morte
- Perdrix et choux

Le Salon, April 1899 (Lyon)

- Perdrix et choux (n. 116)
- Sans titre, untitled (n. 117)

Le Salon, 1898 (Lyon)

- Les condamnés à mort (n. 120)
- Gibier (n. 121)

== Gallery ==
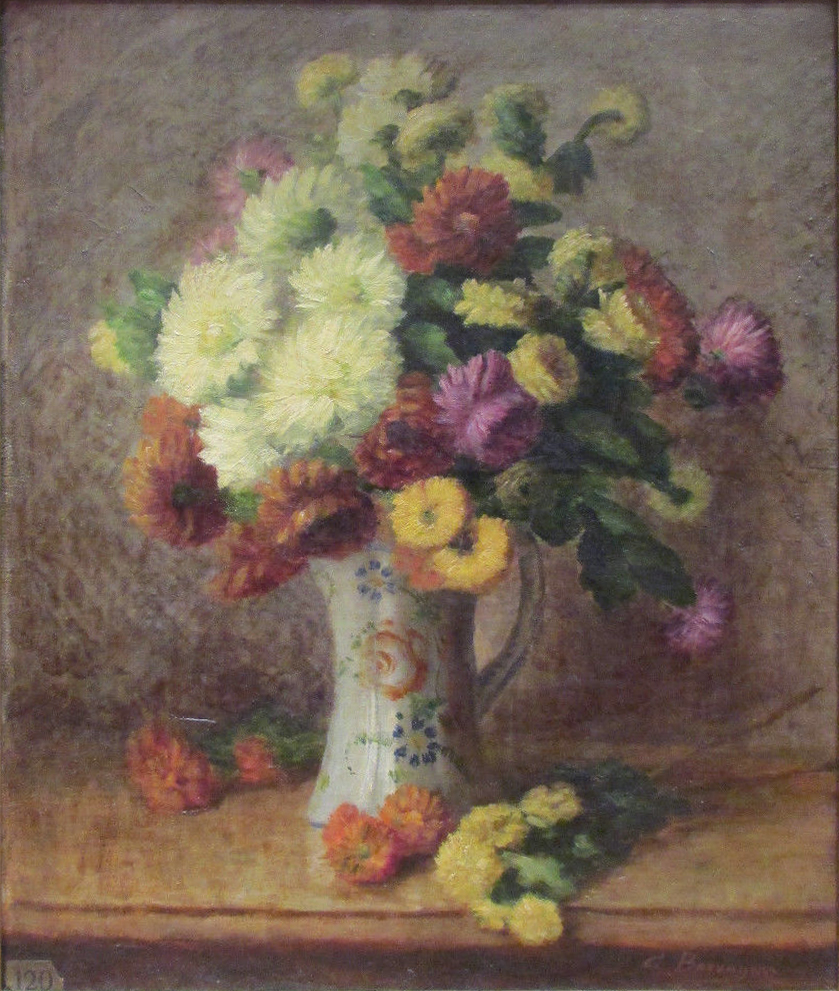
Camille Bouvagne, 1896, Bouquet de fleurs, oil on canvas, 65 x 77.5 (including frame), private collection, France

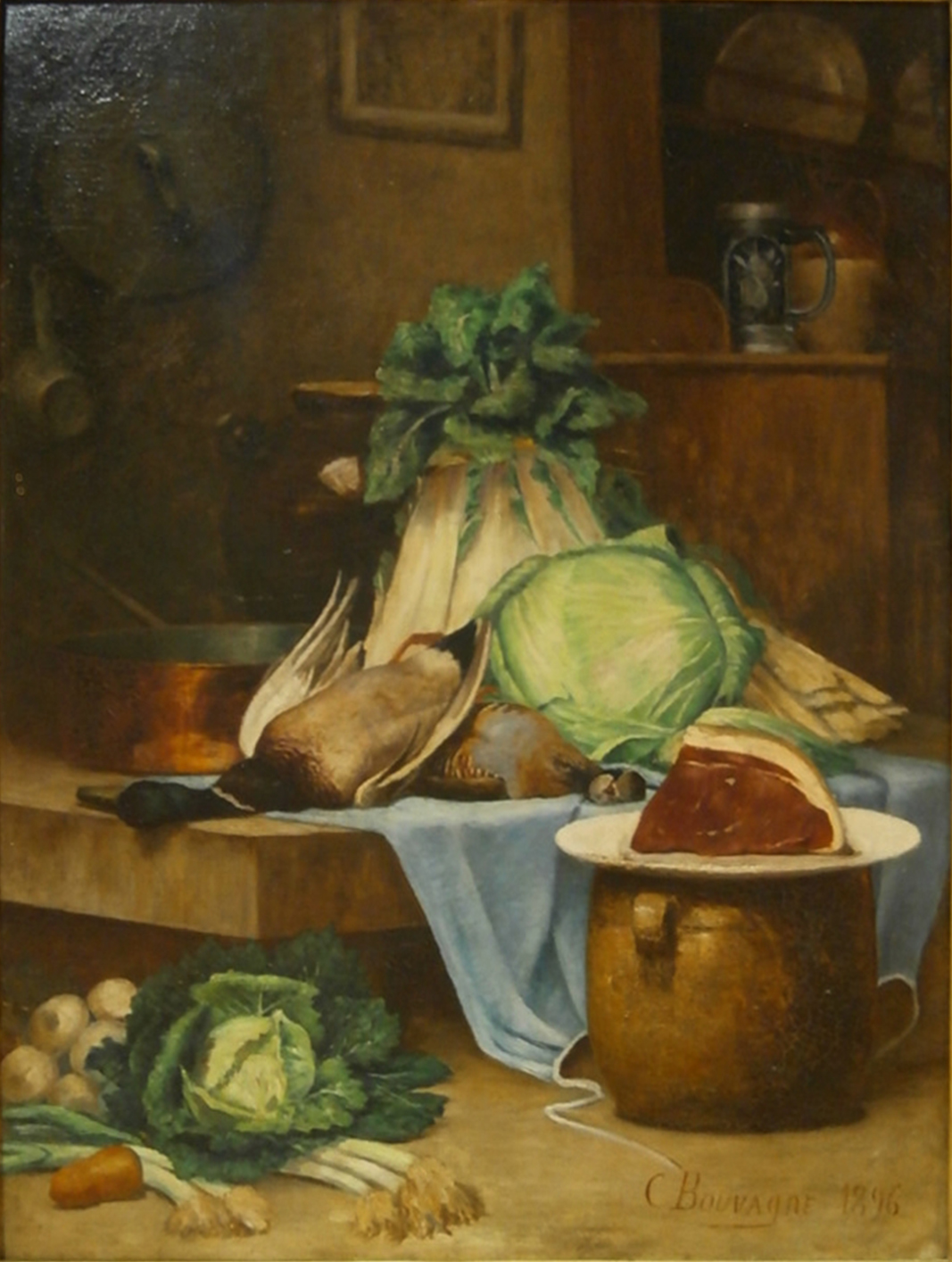
Camille Bouvagne, 1896, Nature morte au canard et à la perdrix, oil on canvas, 117 x 90 cm, private collection, France
