= Oulimata Gueye =

Senegalese-French art critic and curator

- Gueye at Dak'Art 2018
- Education: Paris 8 University (1998)
- Occupations: Art critic and curator

Oulimata Gueye is a Senegalese-French art critic and curator.

== Early life and education ==
Gueye graduated in 1998 from Paris 8 University, where she earned a Master's in Cultural Management and Contemporary Art in Africa.

== Career ==
In 1998, Gueye began her artistic career, starting a job as head of artist residencies at Le Batofar. She helped to co-found the venue. From 2003 to 2011, she co-directed the Infamous carousel festival and the Xamxam platform. However, not all her work has been artistic in nature. Gueye also worked in corporate for 15 years, 2000–2015, for the Bank of Africa. She was in charge of external communications.

In 2012, Gueye returned to school and received her second Master's in Arts and Language from School for Advanced Studies in the Social Sciences in Paris.

Gueye's art curation focuses on the intersection of digitalization and traditional African art. She curated Afropixel Festival (2017–2018), Afrocyberfeminism, and the Digital Imaginaries project (2017–2019). Gueye curated the exhibition Université des Futurs Africains (English: University of African Futures) in Nantes, France in 2021.

From 2021 to 2025, Gueye directed the post-grad art program at the Ecole Nationale Supérieure des Beaux-Arts in Lyon, France.
