= Nicolas Sicard =

French painter

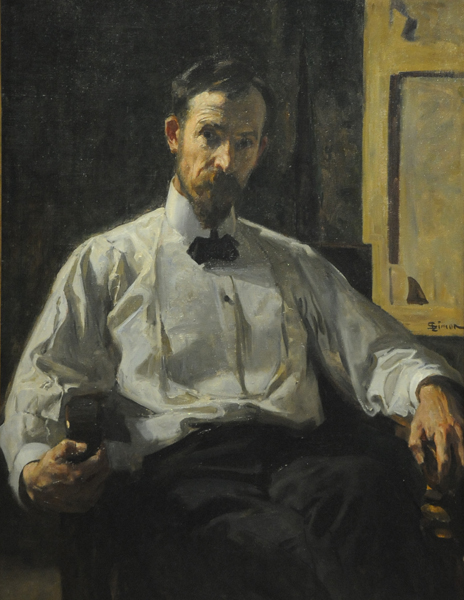
- Self-portrait (date unknown)
- Born: 9 January 1846; Lyon, France
- Died: 1 January 1920 (aged 73); Lyon, France
- Education: École des Beaux-arts de Lyon
- Known for: Painter and educator
- Movement: Orientalist

Nicolas Sicard (9 January 1846, Lyon - 1 January 1920, Lyon) was a French painter; known primarily for historical and battle scenes, although he worked in a wide variety of genres.

== Biography ==
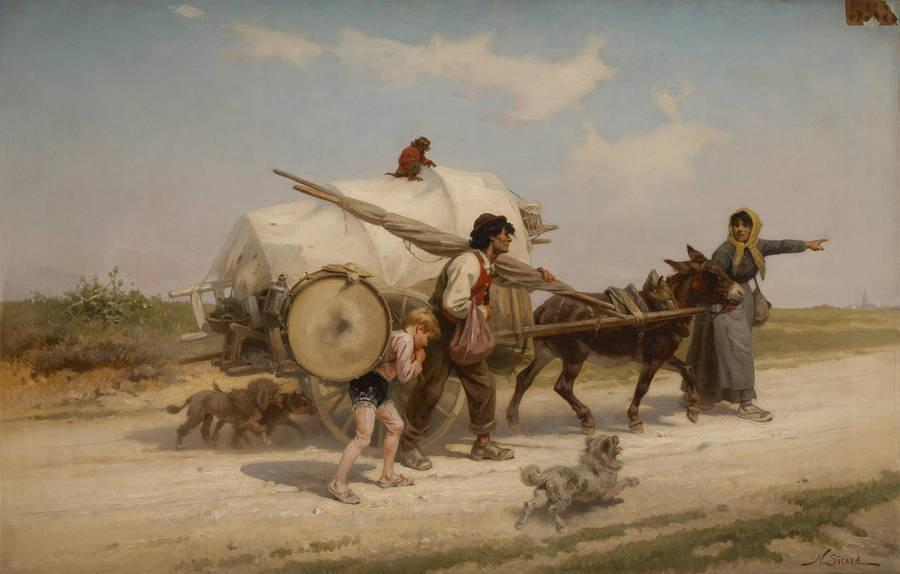
The Acrobats

His father was an apothecary and amateur painter who gave him his first lessons. His first drawings were promising and, at the age of twelve, he entered the École des Beaux-arts de Lyon, where he studied engraving with Victor Vibert and Jean-Baptiste Danguin. In 1861, he won first prize at a painting and lithography contest held by the "Société des Amis des Arts".

From 1865 to 1868, he worked as an illustrator and was a decorative painter for the workshops of Antoine Sublet. In 1869, aged only twenty-three, he had his début at the Salon. His career was, however, interrupted by the Franco-Prussian War, when he enlisted in an artillery battalion and took part in the defense of Paris. After demobilization, he created many realistic scenes of battlefields.

After 1872, he exhibited regularly in both Lyon and Paris, where his works sold well and received good critical notices. He used his earnings to make an extended visit to Spain, which had a permanent influence on his style.

After his father's death in 1881, he returned to Lyon and remained there for the rest of his life. The following year, he was married. Over the next few years, he joined several art societies and professional associations. In 1888, he was named a member of the advisory board at the Museum of Fine Arts of Lyon and replaced his old Professor, Danguin, at the École. He became the Director there in 1894, by ministerial order.

Under his leadership, the École was awarded the Grand Prix at the Exposition Universelle (1900) and four students received the Prix de Rome. That same year, he was named a Knight in the Legion of Honour.

Due to weakening eyesight, he resigned from his position at the École in 1918 and died two years later. A major retrospective of his work was held in 1997, and a street near his studio was named after him.

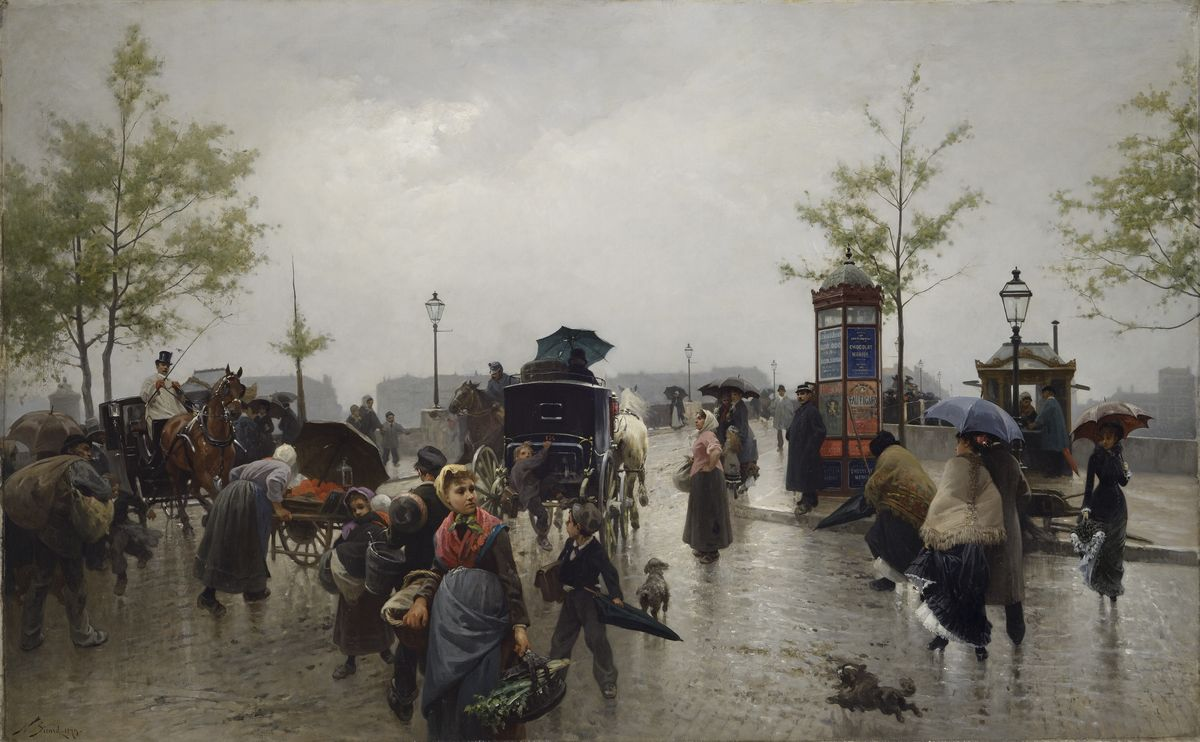
Pont de la Guillotière in Lyon
