= Germain Détanger =

French painter

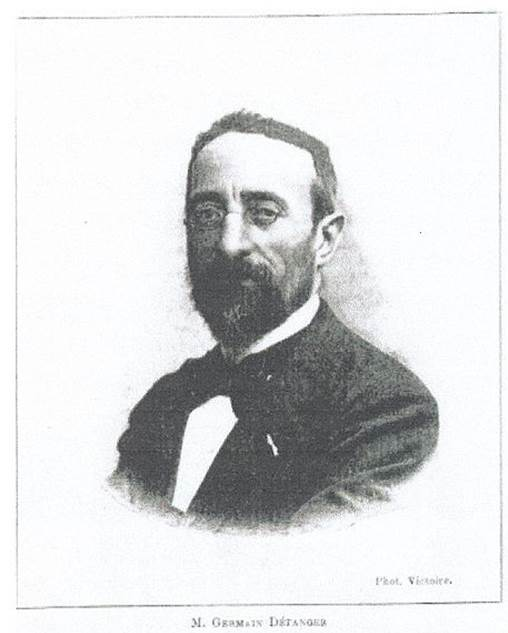
Germain Détanger

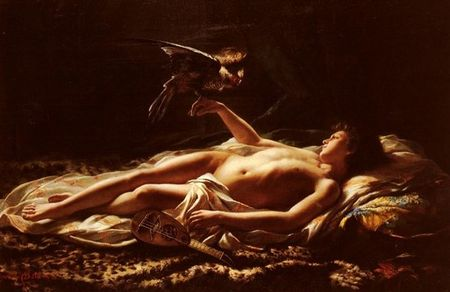
The Falconer

Germain Détanger (27 July 1846, Lyon - 25 January 1902, Lyon) was a French painter, known primarily for his decorative work.

== Biography ==
His father was a plaster contractor. He became a student of the decorative painter Joseph Guichard at the École des Beaux-arts de Lyon in 1860. The following year, he studied portrait painting and graduated at the end of 1862. As early as 1865, he exhibited works in a wide variety of genres. He first had a showing at the Salon in 1892 and returned there in 1894. Two years later, he was named an Officer in the Ordre des Palmes Académiques.

In addition to his canvases, he did decorative works, many of a religious nature, including frescoes at the chapel of the convent in Tullins (1869). He also did restorative work at the church of Yssingeaux in 1893. Other churches where his work may be seen are in Saint-Joseph-de-Rivière, Saint-Chamond, Anse and Lalouvesc.

The chapel at the château of Benoît Charvet, a businessman and politician, near Montbrison, also contains his work. In 1899, he sketched designs for figures on the tombs of the Osias family at the Cemetery of Loyasse.

He was equally prolific in creating works of a non-religious nature; in the salons of the Montgolfier family, the naval steel mills at Saint-Chamond and at the prefecture building of the Rhône Department.

== Sources ==
- Obituary in L'Express de Lyon, 26 January 1902
- Catalogue des ouvrages de peinture, dessin, sculpture et architecture. Exposition Nationale 1896. Ville de Montpellier, printed by Serre et Roumégous
