= Étienne Morillon (painter) =

French painter (1884–1949)

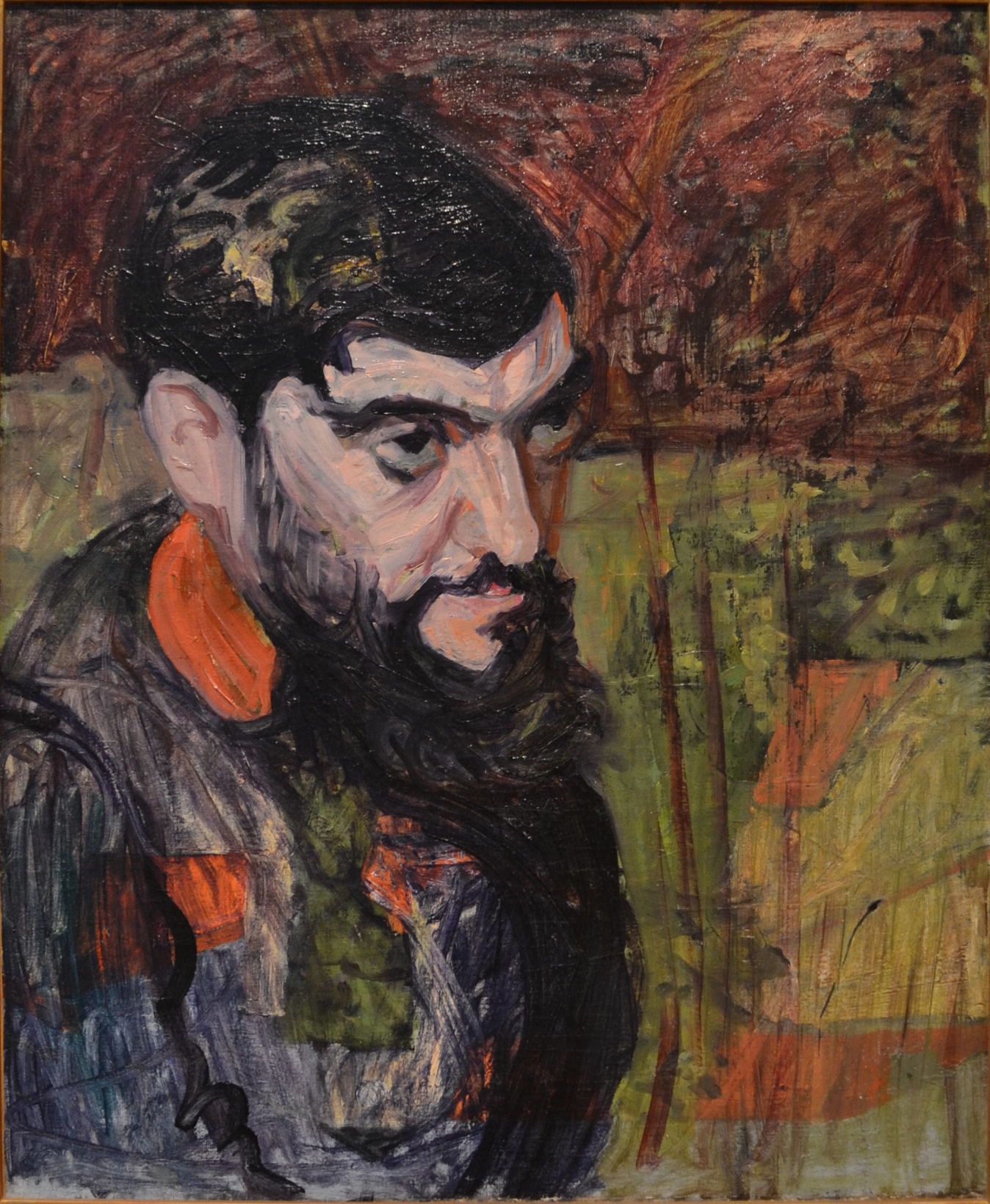
Presumed self-portrait (c.1910)

Étienne Morillon (16 July 1884, Soucieu-en-Jarrest - 17 October 1949, Soucieu-en-Jarrest) was a French painter and engraver.

== Biography ==
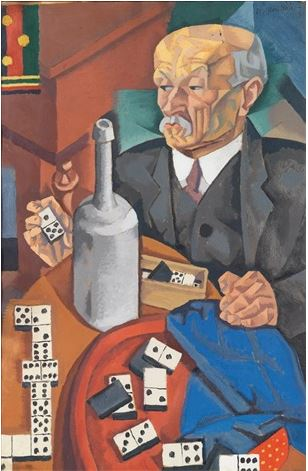
Monsieur Alibaux

His father, Benoit Morillon, was a fabric merchant. After graduating from Aux Lazaristes, a private school in Lyon, he enrolled at the École Nationale Supérieure des Beaux-Arts (ENSBA). He was there from 1901 to 1904; studying with Alexandre François Bonnardel, Auguste Morisot, and Nicolas Sicard.

From 1905 to 1910, he continued his studies at the Beaux-Arts de Paris, where he was exposed to several avant-garde movements, including Pointillism, Fauvism, and Cubism. His first exhibition was in 1908, at the Salon d'automne. He returned to Lyon in 1910, where he took over a studio that once belonged to Paul Borel.

In 1914, he married Rose Desrats. They had two children. He briefly took part in World War I, but was gassed and discharged with a temporary disability pension. During this time, he began exhibiting at the Salon des Indépendants, in Paris, and would continue to do so through 1924.

In 1920, he became one of the first members of Les Ziniars, a group of modernist artists in Lyon, and participated in founding their "Salon du Sud-Est". Until 1926, he taught drawing at ENSBA. From 1927 to 1930, he worked at the Galerie Saint-Pierre, founded by the Parisian merchant, Alfred Poyet. His woodcuts appeared in the revues, L'ours and L'Effort libre, and were used to illustrate Un journal d'exil, by Alexandre Arnoux.

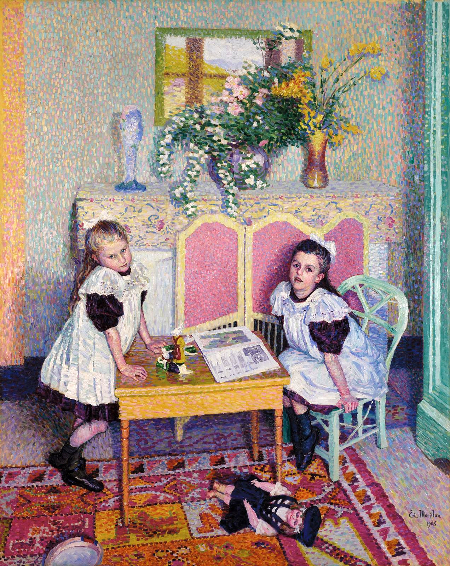
Two Little Sisters

The 1930s and 40s were his most creative years. He served as vice-president of the Salon du Sud-Est in 1938 and 1940; exhibiting regularly at the Galerie des Archers and the Galerie de Troncy. His largest showing was at the Exposition Internationale de Lyon, in 1933. He also participated in the Exposition Universelle of 1937, where he was part of a group of artists that decorated Lyon's pavilion.

His works may be seen at the Musée des beaux-arts de Lyon and the Musée Paul-Dini de Villefranche-sur-Saône, among others.
