= Augustin Chenu =

French painter (1833–1875)

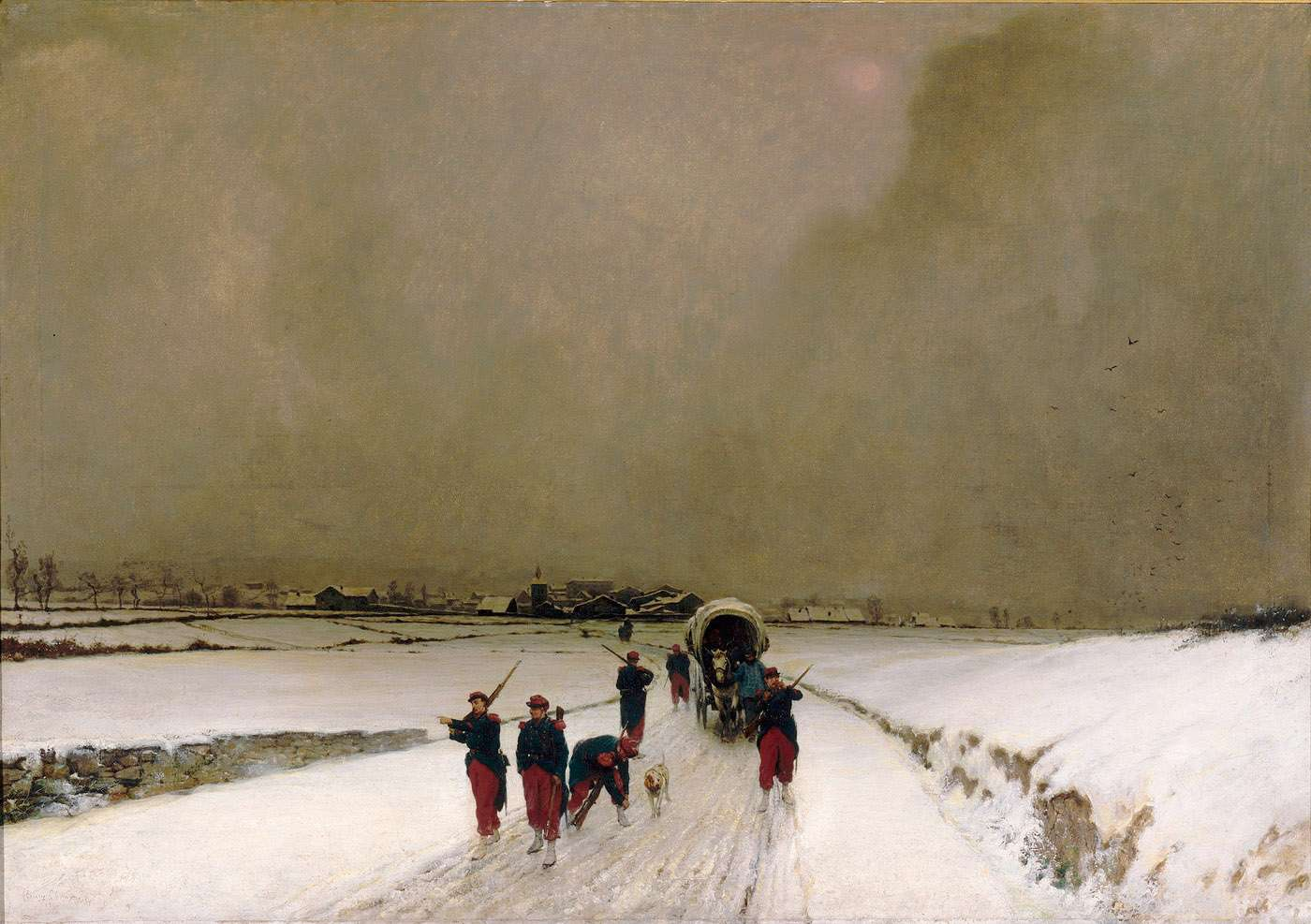
The Stragglers

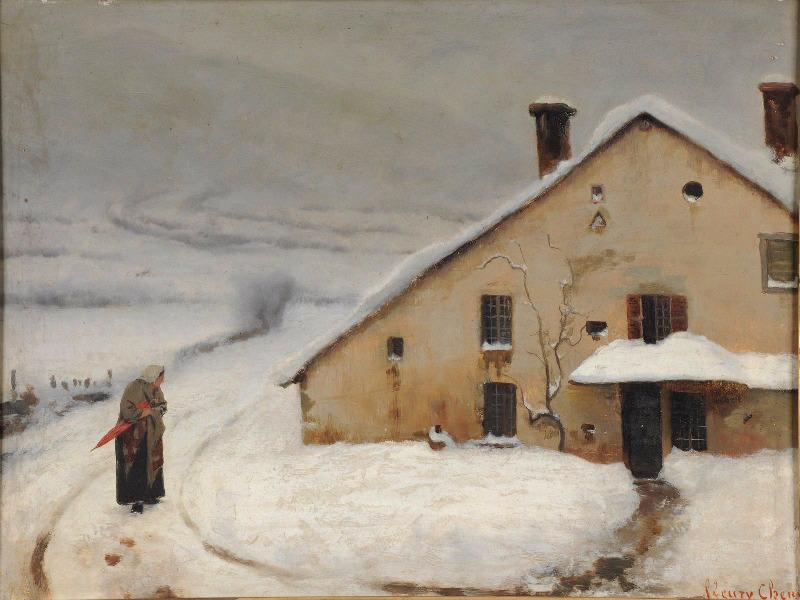
Cottage in the Winter

Augustin Pierre Bienvenu Chenu, also known as Fleury Chenu (12 May 1833, Briançon - 9 May 1875, Lyon) was a French painter; known for his local landscapes and hunting scenes.

== Biography ==
His father was a master tailor who worked for the Sixth "Régiment de Ligne". He spent most of his childhood in Briançon, where the beauty of the local countryside inspired him to make landscape drawings. In 1846, his family moved to Lyon and he entered the École Nationale des Beaux-arts, where he studied design and painting with Michel Philibert Genod and Claude Bonnefond.

His career began poorly and financial difficulties forced him to take work painting the ceiling at the local casino. Beginning in 1854, he participated in the local salons and attracted positive attention there, but failed to acquire a clientele outside of Lyon. He finally gained some nationwide attention with his showing at the International Exposition of Paris in 1867; notably with his tableau depicting the Carthusians in Lyon.

His fame was established by a series of genre scenes of life in Lyon; two of which were acquired by the government and put on display at the Musée du Luxembourg. These purchases insured his financial security, but his career was short as he died of a heart ailment in 1875, just three days before his forty-second birthday.

Today, he is known primarily for hunting scenes and snowy landscapes. He was, in fact, sometimes called the "peintre de la neige" (Snow painter). In addition to his canvases, he also did decorative work in Lyon at the Hôtel de l'Europe and the Palais de la Bourse.
