= Antoine Duclaux =

French painter (1783–1868)

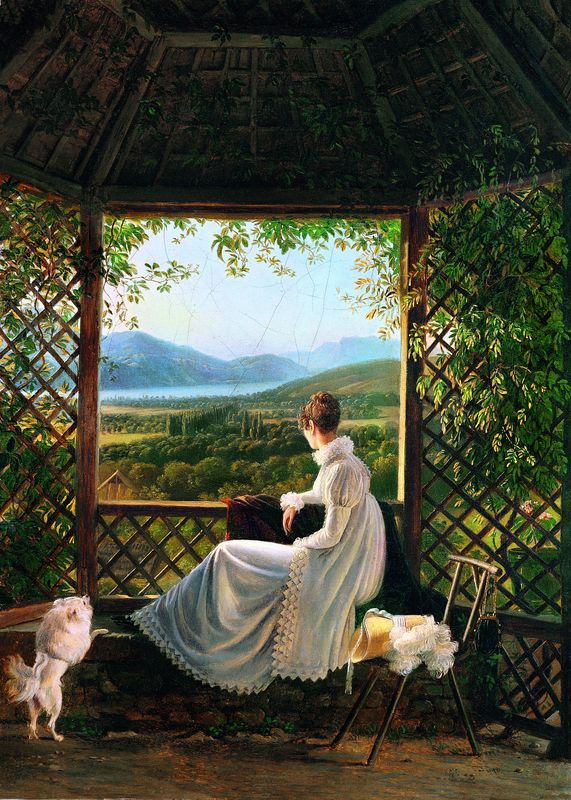
Queen Hortense at Aix-les-Bains, 1813, Musée Napoléon, Arenenberg, Switzerland.

Antoine-Jean Duclaux (26 July 1783, Lyon - 21 March 1868, Sainte-Foy-lès-Lyon) was a French landscape and animal painter of the Lyon School.

== Life ==
The Duclaux family suffered under the Reign of Terror and were hunted out of Lyon They took refuge at Charrecey in Burgundy where they held the Chandelux estate. However, they quickly fell on hard times and had to rely on neighbours' charity. Many relations were executed by guillotine and firing squad, including two of the painter's brothers. Aged 17, Antoine was sent to work as a shop boy, but around 1805 he had the chance to leave for Naples as secretary to general Fursy Compère, who he had met on Napoleon's trip to Lyon as first consul - Compère had offered him Duclaux's first painting, showing a horse. Duclaux spent two years at the court of Joseph Bonaparte.
