= Paul Chenavard =

French painter (1808–1895)

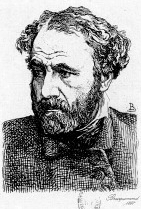
Paul Chenavard Etching by Félix Bracquemond

Paul-Marc-Joseph Chenavard (9 December 1808 – 1895) was a French painter.

== Life ==
Entering the École des beaux-arts en 1825, he studied in the studio of Ingres alongside his friend Joseph Guichard, then in the studios of Hersent and Delacroix.

The influence of German philosophy and painting led him to believe that art's aim had to be humanitarian and civilising. He died in Paris in 1895 and was buried in the new Cimetière de Loyasse at Lyon.

== Works ==
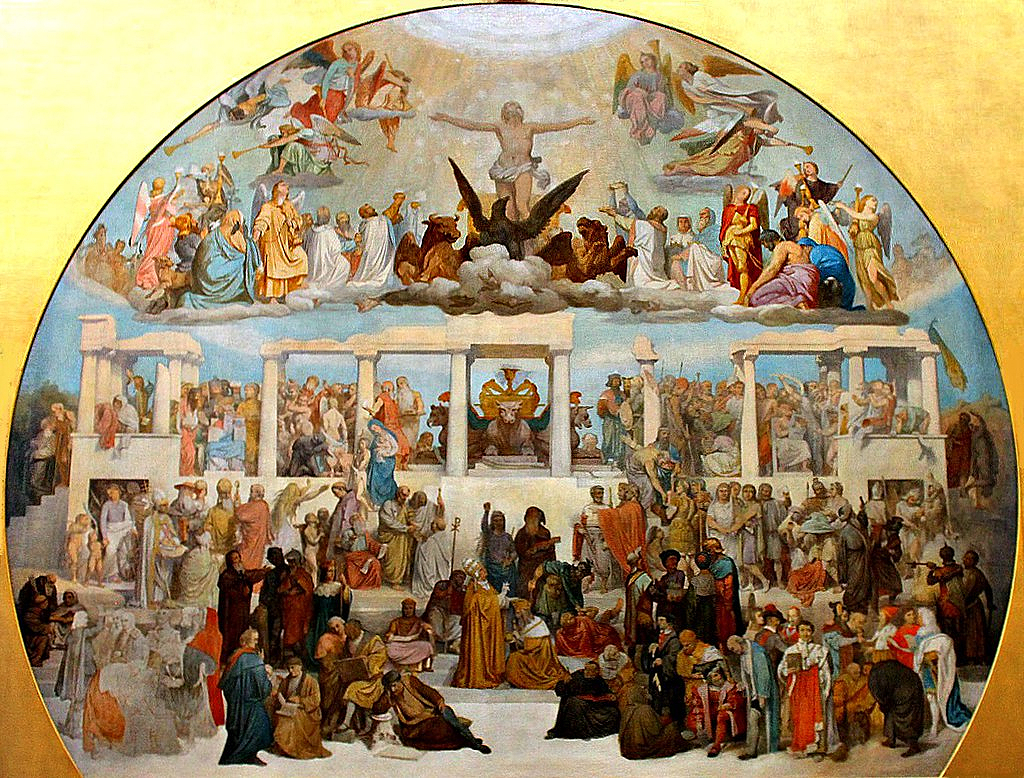
La Palingénésie sociale or La Philosophie de l'histoire. Oil painting. 303 x 380 cm.Musée des Beaux-Arts de Lyon

- Hell (1846), Montpellier, Musée Fabre
- The Continence of Scipio (1848) Lyon, Musée des Beaux-Arts
- Divina Tragedia (between 1865 and 1869) Paris, Musée d'Orsay

== Bibliography ==
- Joseph C. Sloane, Paul Marc Joseph Chenavard: Artist of 1848, Chapel Hill, The University of North Carolina Press, 214 p.
- Théophile Silvestre, Histoire des artistes vivants français et étrangers, Paris, 1856
- Théophile Gautier : description des peintures de Chenavard au Panthéon sur : http://gallica.bnf.fr/ark:/12148/bpt6k109148c/f4.image.r=.langFR
