= Michel Philibert Genod =

French painter (1795–1862)

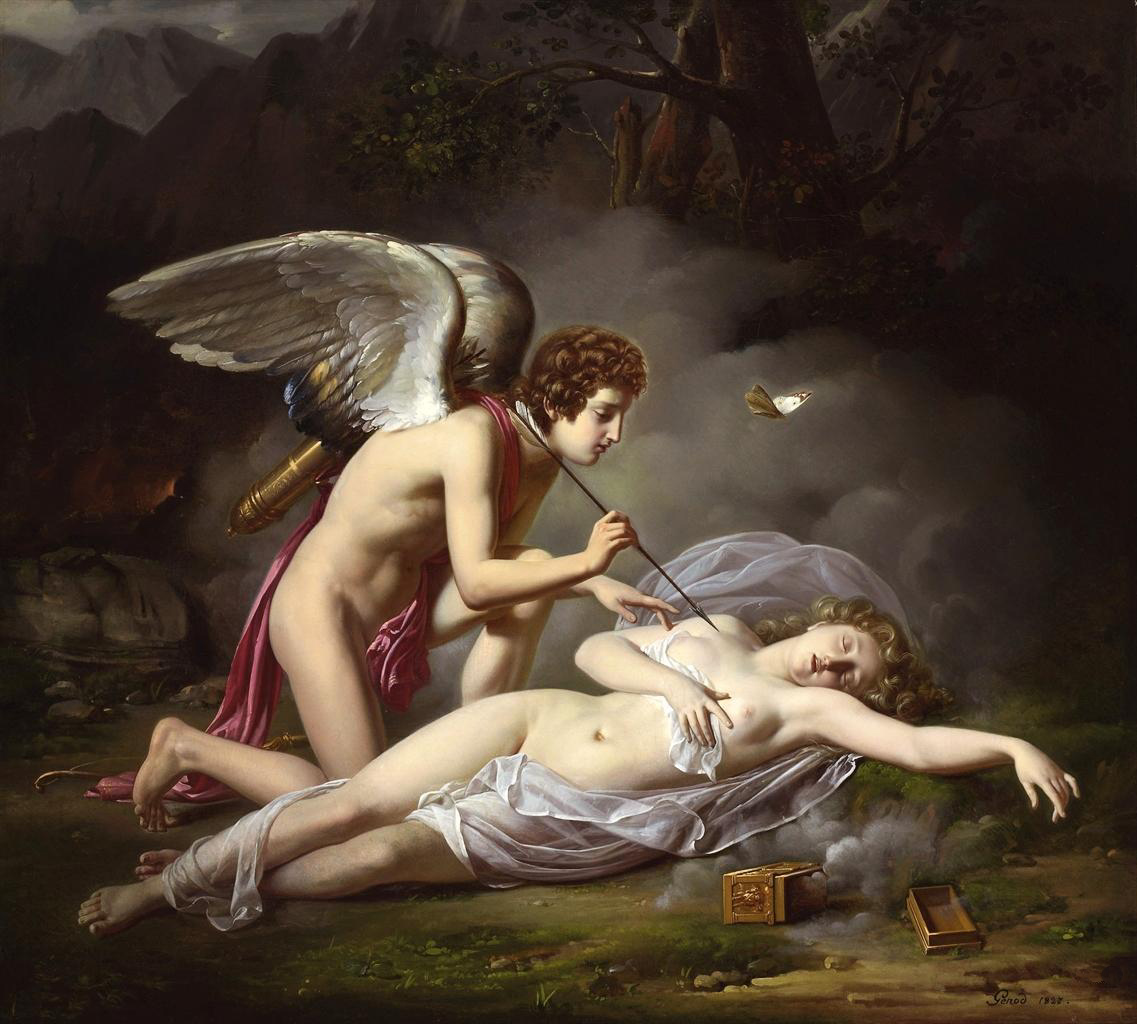
Cupid and Psyche

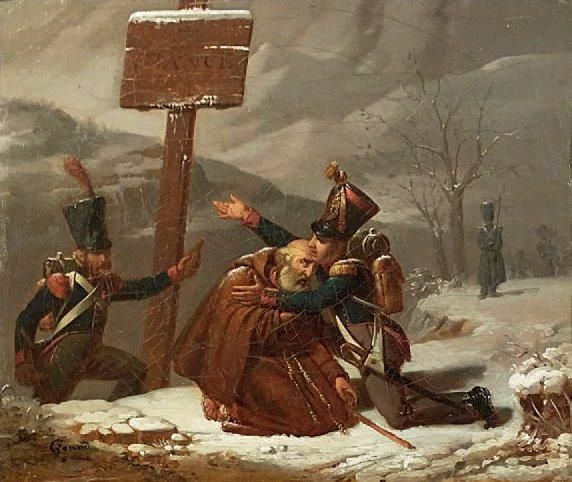
Soldiers Rescuing a Monk

Michel Philibert Genod (20 September 1795, Lyon – 24 July 1862, Lyon) was a French genre and history painter in the Troubador style.

== Biography ==
He was born while Lyon was still recovering from the effects of the Siege. He studied with Pierre Revoil from 1807 to 1813.

He held his first exhibit at the Salon of 1819. Some of his works were purchased by Charles Ferdinand, Duke of Berry. King Louis XVIII is said to have told him, "Not only do you speak to the eyes, but you speak mainly to the heart". He was also awarded a second-class medal. He was sometimes referred to as the "Greuze of Lyon".

In 1839, he was appointed a professor at the École des beaux-arts de Lyon, a position he held until his death.

In 1845, he completed several paintings by his teacher, Revoil, dealing with the history of Pharamond, that Revoil had begun shortly before his death.

He was named a Knight in the Legion of Honor in 1855, after a successful showing at the Exposiiton Universelle. At the Salon of 1857, his depiction of a flood in Brotteaux was purchased by Napoleon III. He had several students; notably Fleury Chenu.
