= Antoine Sublet =

French painter (1821–1897)

- Born: 1821; Lyon
- Died: 1897 (aged 75–76); Paris
- Occupation: Painter

Antoine Sublet (1821–1897) was a French painter and muralist.

== Biography ==
=== Early life ===
Benoît-Antoine Sublet was born in 1821 in Lyon. He was ordained as a Roman Catholic priest, and was particularly close to the Carthusian Order.

=== Career ===
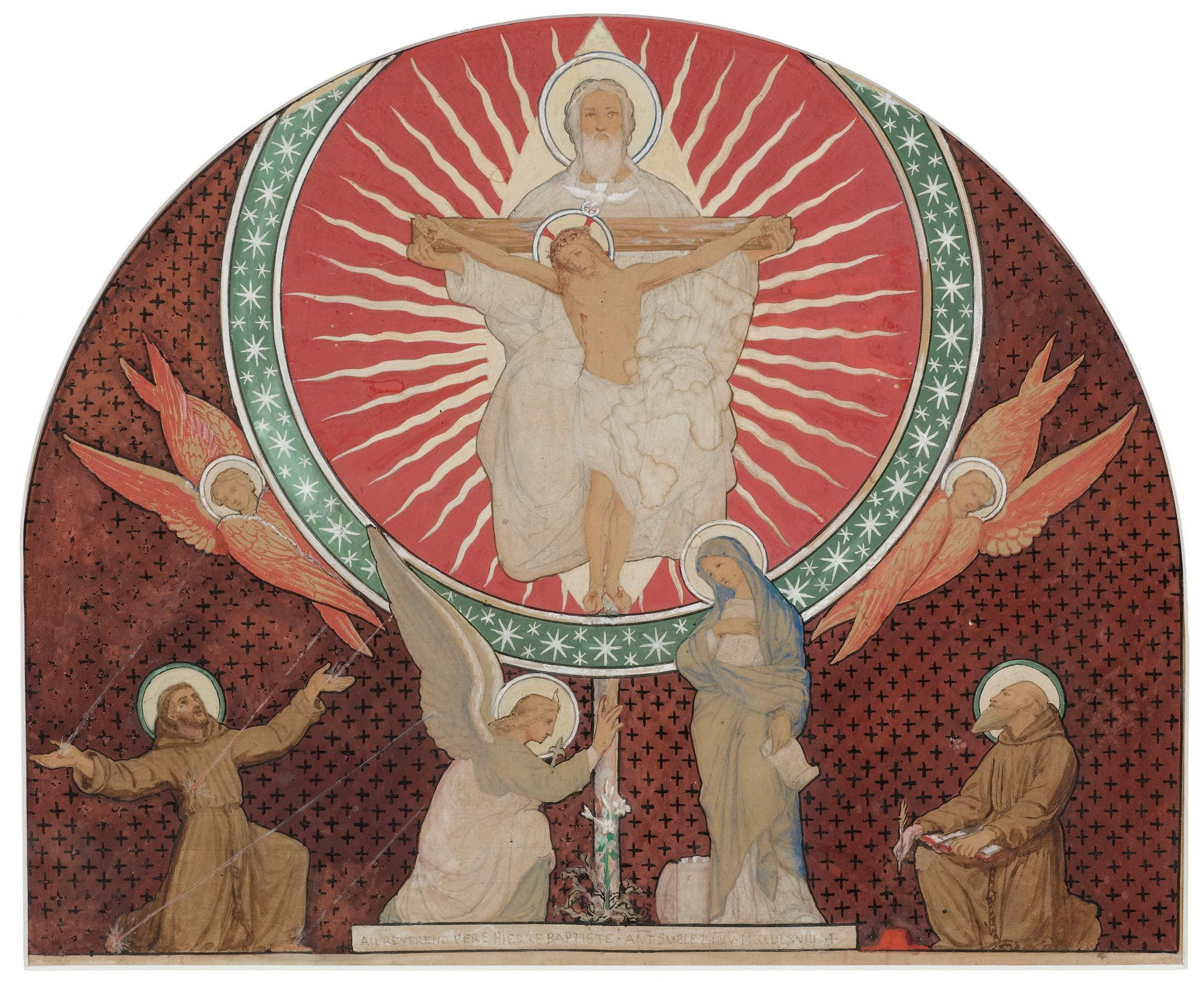
The Holy Trinity

He painted frescoes inside Belley Cathedral and the Hôtel-Dieu de Lyon. Additionally, he painted the vault inside the Église Saint-Théodore in Marseille from 1860 to 1863.

While he was living in Rome, Italy, he worked as a copyist for painter Charles Soulacroix (1825–1899). His painting entitled The Apparition of the Sacred Heart to Marguerite-marie Alacoque is displayed inside the Church of Saint-Bruno des Chartreux in Lyon.

=== Death ===
He died in 1897 in Paris.
