= École nationale supérieure des beaux-arts de Lyon =

School of art and design in Lyon, France

Coordinates: 45°46′06″N 4°49′01″E

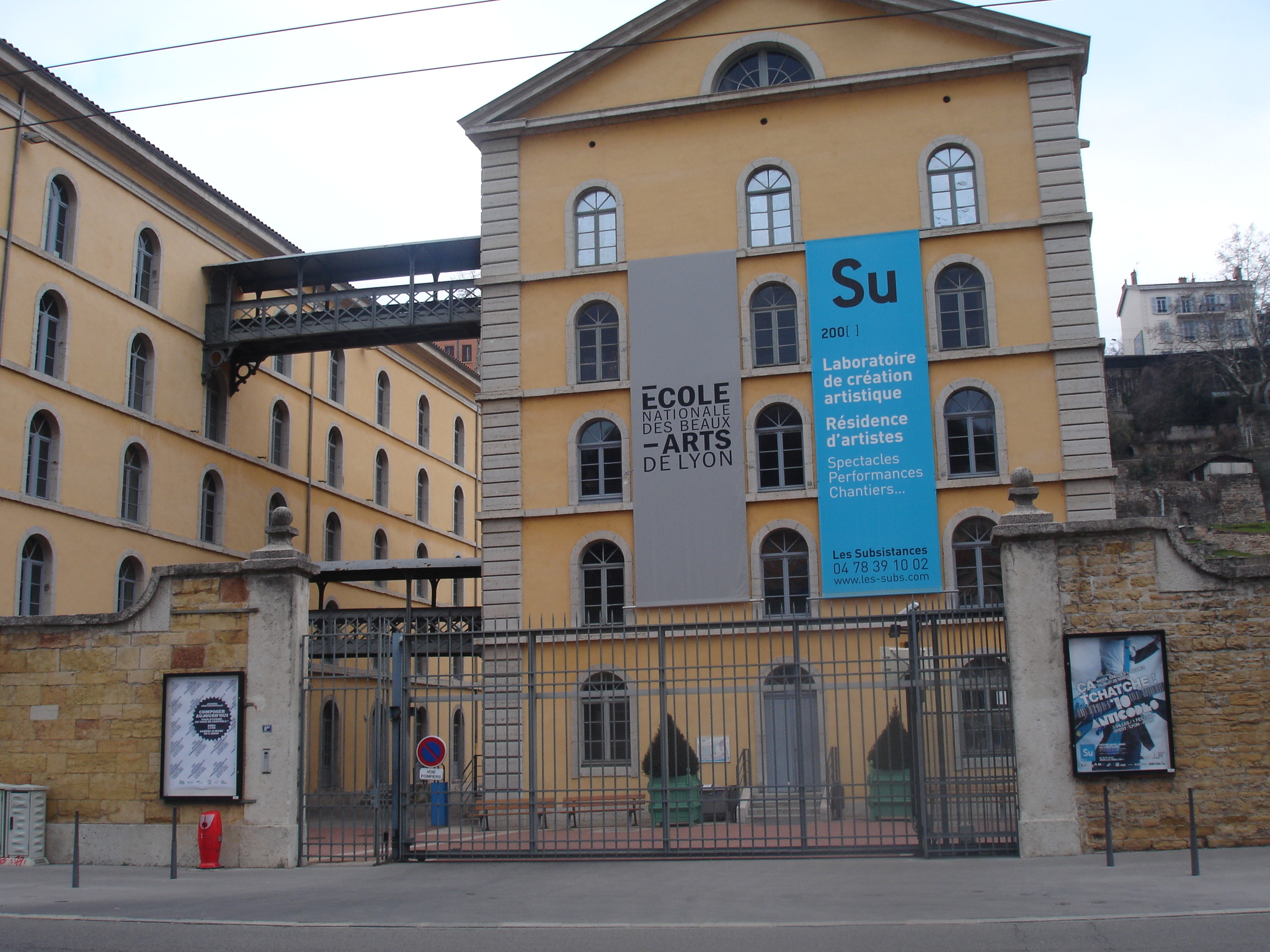
Exterior view

The École nationale supérieure des beaux-arts de Lyon is a school of art and design in Lyon, located in Les Subsistances, in the 1st arrondissement of Lyon, in the Rhône-Alpes region of France. It is part of the École des Beaux-Arts tradition, that established the Beaux-Arts architecture style.

== History ==
It was founded in 1756 by abbé Lacroix-Laval and a group of art lovers. The school of drawing was free of charge and, owing to its royal charter for academies in the provinces, in 1780 it became the École Royale académique de dessin et géométrie and became one of the earliest French art schools outside Paris.

== Directors ==
- 1960–1974: Jean Coquet
- 1974–1992: Philippe Nahoum
- 1992–1998: Guy Issanjou
- 1998–2011: Yves Robert
- 2011–2018: Emmanuel Tibloux
- 2021–2025: Oulimata Gueye

== Notable teachers ==
- Yves Aupetitallot
- Alexandre François Bonnardel from 1900 professor of Life drawing
- Antoine Chartres from 1939
- Catherine Beaugrand
- Patrick Beurard-Valdoye
- Nicolas Frespech
- Géraldine Kosiak
- Jérôme Mauche
- Franck Scurti
- Veit Stratmann
- Victor Vibert
- Olivier Zabat

== Notable alumni ==
- Adrien Bas, c. 1902
- Jean-François Bellay
- Jean-Baptiste Beuchot, 1836 to 1841
- Alexandre François Bonnardel, from 1891
- Jean-Marie Bonnassieux, 1828 to 1833
- Claude Bonnefond
- Jean-Baptiste Bouchardon, architect, sculptor
- Louis Bouquet, 1903 to 1907
- Camille Bouvagne, c. 1883 to 1887
- Jean Chaleyé, 1896 to 1899
- Fleury Chenu
- Pierre Combet-Descombes, c. 1902
- Léon Couturier
- Lionel Estève, c. 1980
- Louis Deschamps (painter)
- Germain Détanger, from 1860
- Antoine Duclaux
- Joseph Dufour (painter), 1784
- Hippolyte Flandrin, from 1828
- Michel Philibert Genod
- Laurent Godin, c. 1980
- François Guiguet
- Léonie Humbert-Vignot, c. 1894
- Jean-Marie Jacomin, painter
- Jean-Baptiste Larrivé, 1890 to 1896
- Jean-François Legendre-Héral, sculptor
- Alphonse Legros, c. 1855
- Francisque Pomat
- Jean-Marie Reignier, c. 1833
- Jean Seignemartin, 1860 to 1865
- Nicolas Sicard
- Jacques Tardi
- Tony Tollet, 1873 to 1879
- Anthelme Trimolet
- Jean-Baptiste Vietty, c. 1807
- Louis Vuillermoz, 1939 to 1940*
