= Paul Borel =

French painter

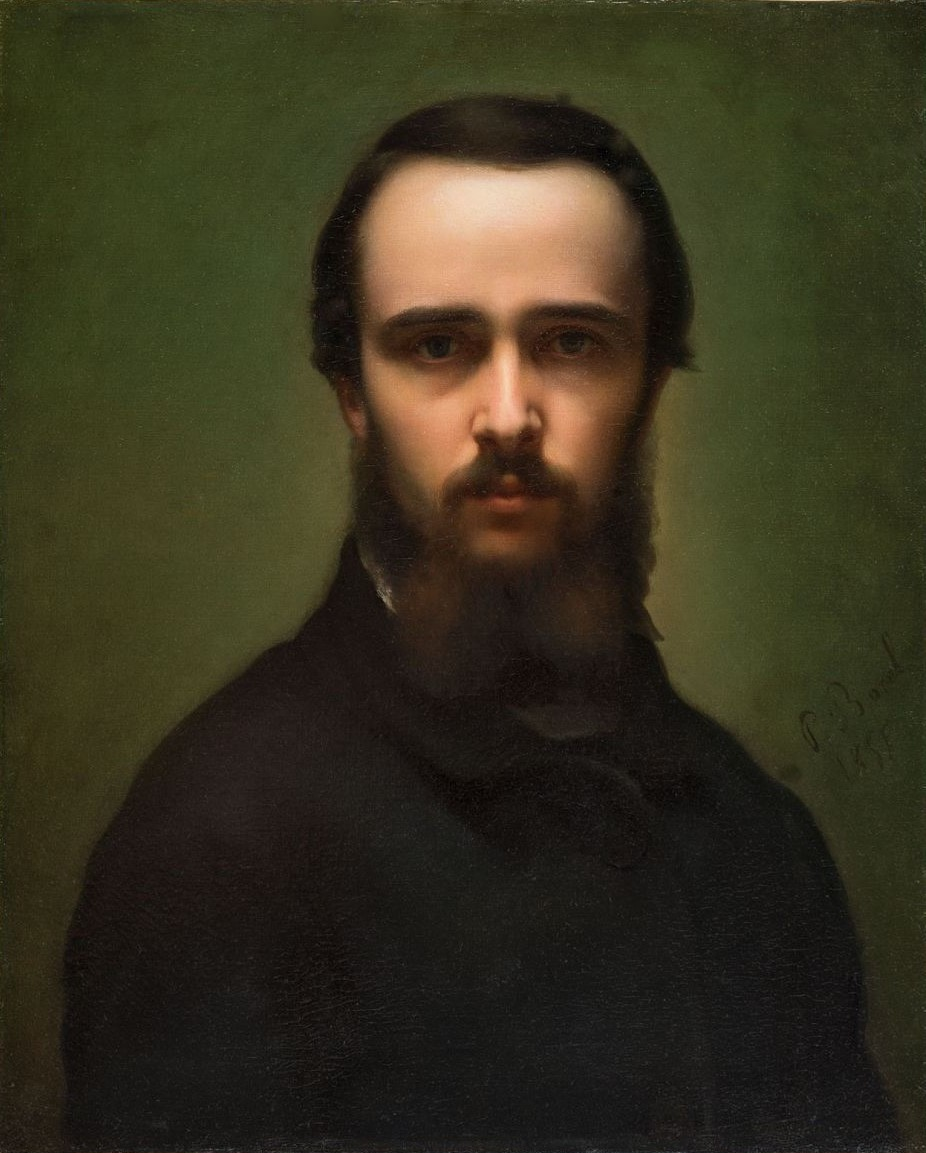
Self-portrait (1855)

André Marie Paul Borel (12 February 1828, Lyon - 26 January 1913, Lyon) was a French painter and engraver; specializing in historical and religious scenes.

== Biography ==
He was born to a family of merchants. His father died when he was ten, so he and his older brother, Léon, were adopted by his grandmother. Shortly after, he began attending the École Saint-Thomas d'Aquin-Veritas in Oullins. When Léon became ill, and was sent to the Riviera to recuperate, he began travelling; visiting Saint-Chamond, Ardèche and the Massif du Vercors, where he began making some amateur sketches. Léon died in 1848, prompting him to decide if he wanted to be a priest or an artist.

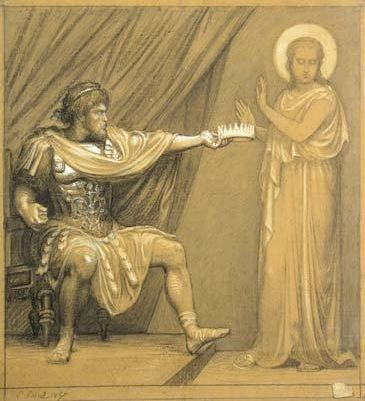
Saint Philomena and Diocletian

That same year, he formed a lifelong friendship with the painter, Louis Janmot. The following year, he went to Paris where, with Janmot's assistance, he studied and made copies of the Old Masters at the Louvre. He had his first showing at the Salon de Lyon in 1851, with scenes from the lives of several saints. In 1852, he and Janmot made a grand tour of Italy, seeking inspiration.

In 1855, he spent a year in Paris, studying with Joseph-Victor Ranvier and Irénée Richard (1821-1906) at the Académie Suisse. He returned to Rome in 1856, where he conducted a lengthy study of the Catacomb of callixtus. That same year, he married Adèle Mouton, the sister of one of his friends at the École Saint-Thomas. In 1857, he had his first showing at the Salon, and took some additional lessons from Hippolyte Flandrin.

After only two years of marriage, Adèle died. To help assuage his grief, he accepted a large commission from the architect, Pierre Bossan, to create murals for the new chapel at the École Saint-Thomas. In 1860, a family inheritance gave him the freedom to work at his own pace. His murals at the École would take him twenty years to complete. After 1863, he focused entirely on religious works and refused to accept any payment. During this time, he made the acquaintance of François-Auguste Ravier, who introduced him to landscape painting techniques.

Between 1880 and 1885, he took a break from his work to travel with his friends, the painter Joseph Trévoux, and the photographer Félix Thiollier; visiting the Massif Central, Belgium, and the Netherlands. His next large projects came in 1898, when he began decorating the chapel of the Augustinians in Versailles, the Église Saint-Paul, and the Église Saint-Joseph in Brotteaux.

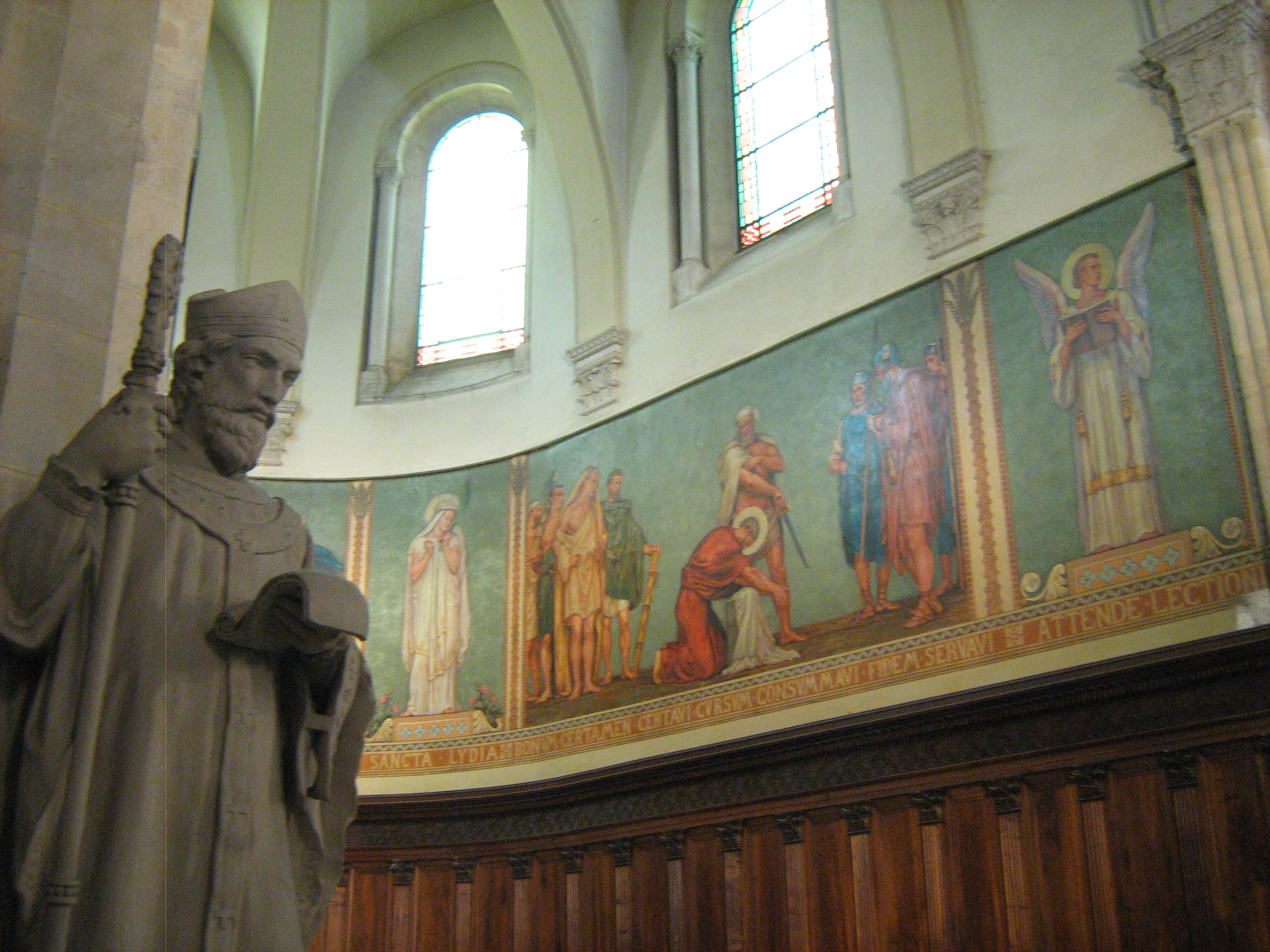
Frescoes at the Église Saint-Paul

He also taught occasionally; giving drawing lessons to the glass artist, Lucien Bégule, and the engraver, Marcel Roux. In 1899, he was named a Knight in the Order of St. Gregory the Great. A street in Lyon has been named after him.

== Sources ==
- Paul Borel 1828-1913. Paysages Dessins et gravures, Musée de l Imprimerie et de la Banque Lyon, 1985
- Félix Thiollier, Paul Borel, peintre et graveur lyonnais (1828-1913), Lyon, Lardanchet, 1913
- Colette Bidon, Paul Borel : 1828-1913 : œuvre gravé : recherches de prières visuelles au XIXe siècle, exhibition catalog, Palais des Congrès, 1978
- Élisabeth Hardouin-Fugier, Paul Borel à l'Hôpital Saint-Luc, J.-C. Hoppenat, 1980
