= Jean-Baptiste Frénet =

French painter, photographer (1814–1889)

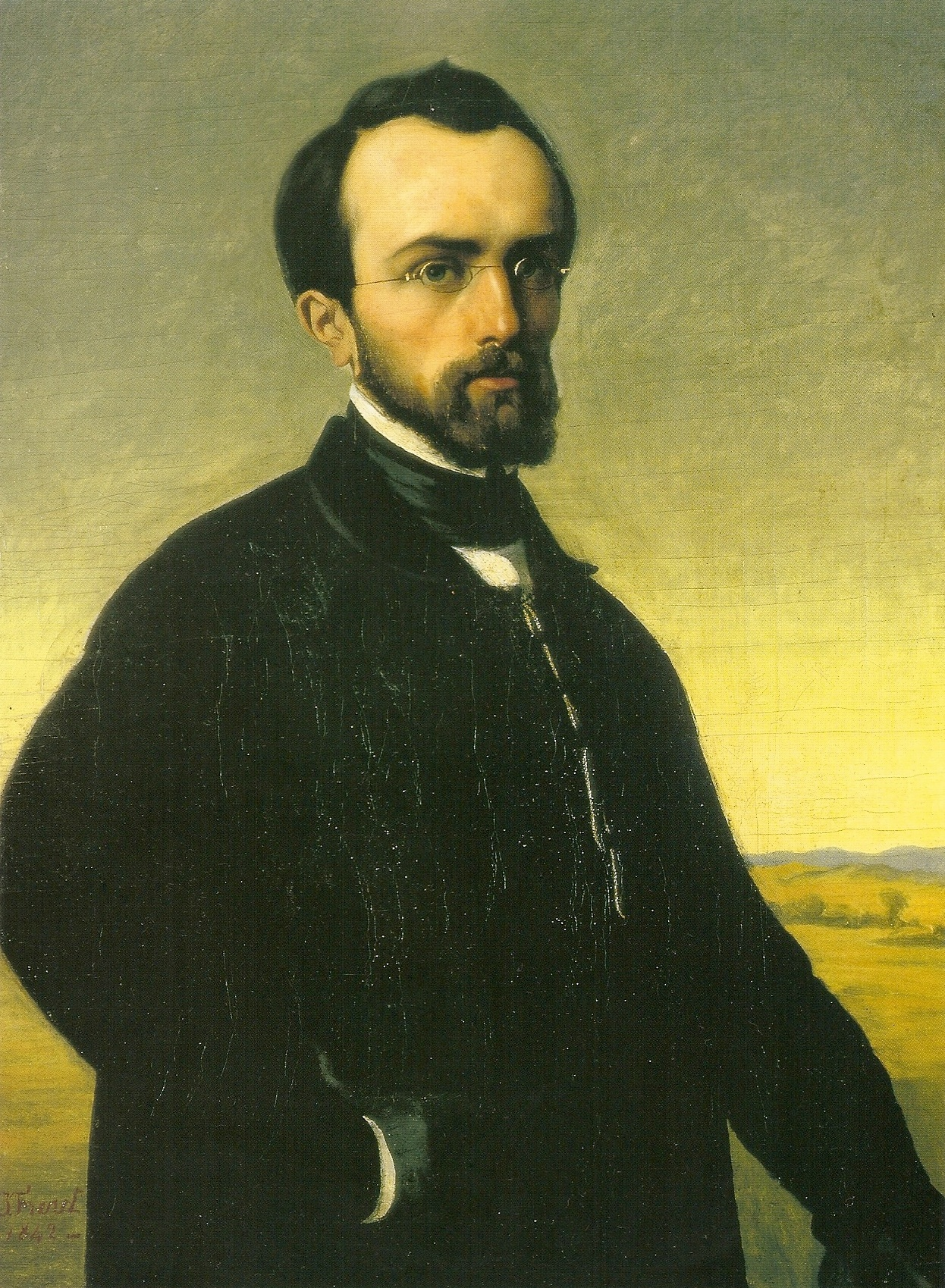
Jean-Baptiste Frénet, self-portrait

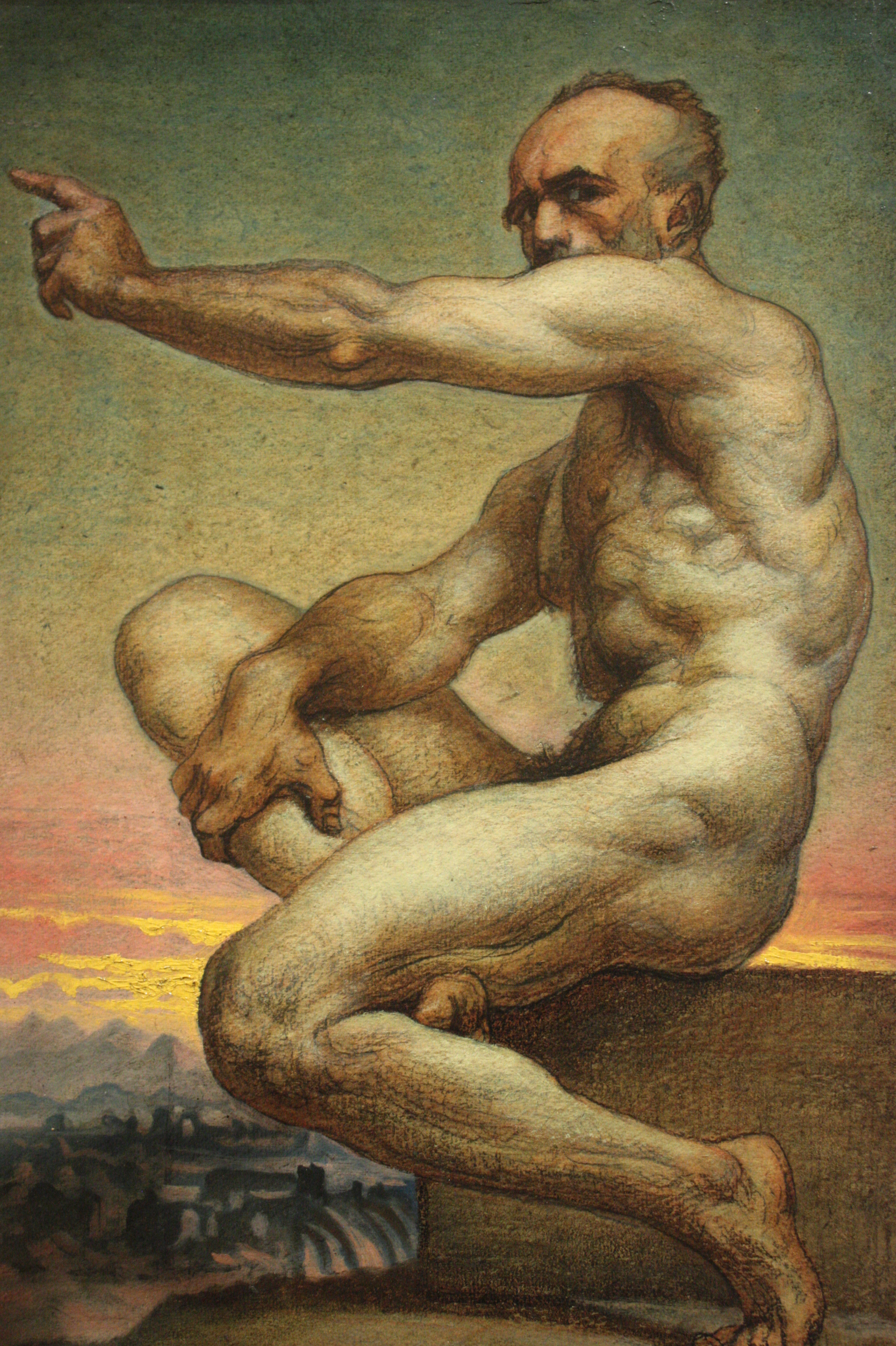
Jean-Baptiste Frénet, self-portrait in creationist pose

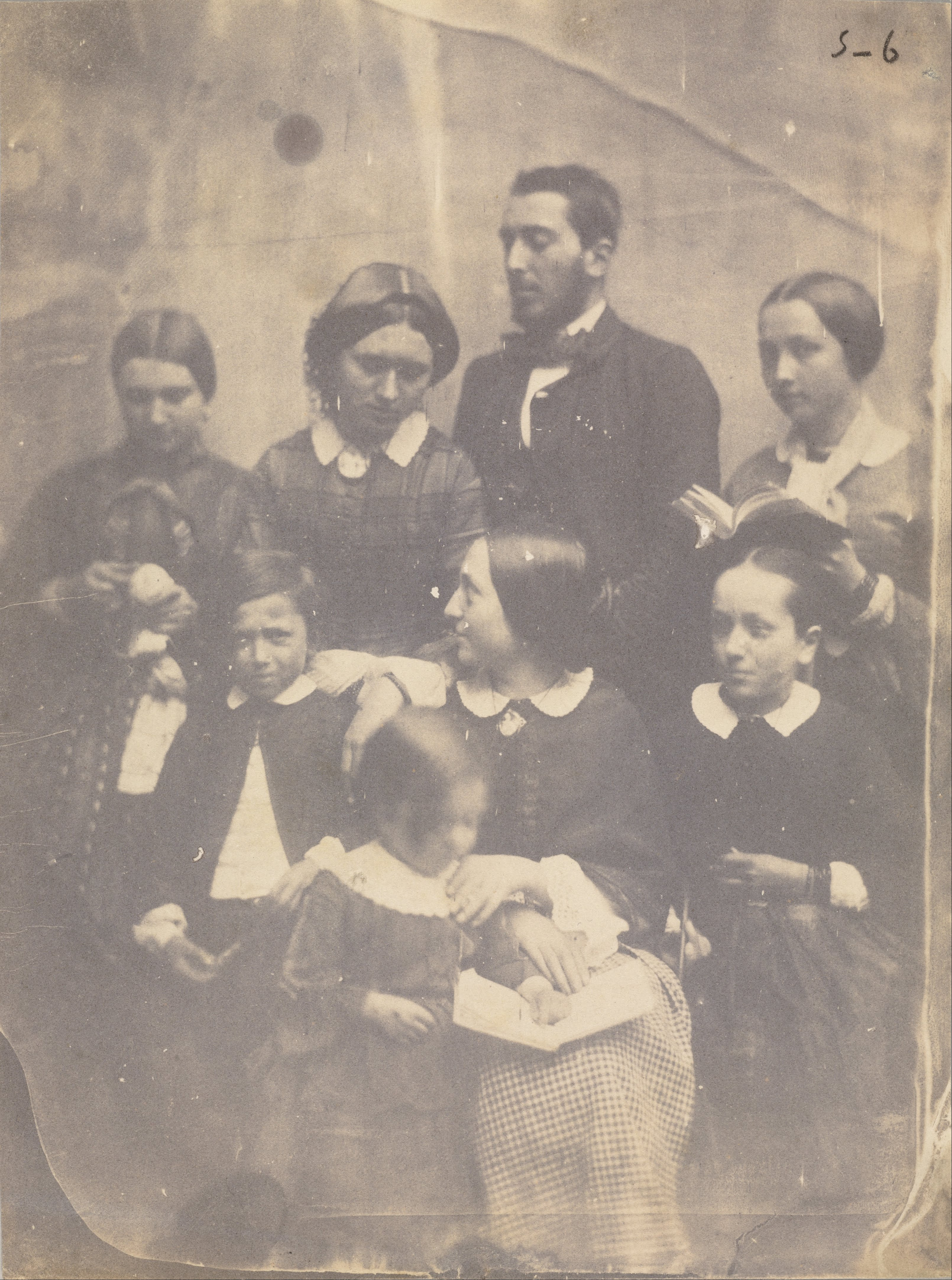
Family Portrait by Jean-Baptiste Frénet

Jean-Baptiste Frénet (1814-1889) was a French painter, sculptor, photographer and politician based in Lyon.

== Life ==
He was born in Lyon on 31 January 1814, the son of a manufacturer of silk cloth. He learned the artistic aspects of the silk trade from his father and attended the School of Fine Arts in lyon between 1827 and 1833, studying painting and life drawing. In 1835 he moved to Paris to continue his training in the studio of Jean-Auguste-Dominique Ingres.

He then attended Frédéric Ozanam's college within the Society of Saint Vincent de Paul, which advocated Catholic libertarian values (which were condemned by the Pope). This period was inspirational for Frénet and inspired his later religious works.

Following the closure of Ingres' workshop, Frénet, with his friends Louis Janmot and Claudius Lavergne, undertook a study trip to Italy to visit Ingres, where the latter had become Director of the French Academy in Rome. A small colony from Lyon, also including Hippolyte Flandrin, centred around Ingres in the Villa Medici: they drew and painted the Roman monuments. In 1837 Frénet visited Florence and then left Italy.

Back in Lyon, Frénet made his first public exhibition at the 1837 Exhibition, which consisted of works brought back from Italy. In 1840 he made a second trip to Italy and again exhibited his work on his return to France. He thereafter became a recognized member of the School of Lyon. However, art critics were not always kind to him. Failing to win any prizes in Paris, where he exhibited at the Salon of 1841, he decided to relocate to the village of Charly, near Lyon, where he had bought a house.

He continued his work, mostly choosing religious subjects. He painted frescoes and designed stained glass for the Saint-Louis-de-la-Guillotière church in Charly. Following the Revolution of 1848, he became involved in municipal politics and was elected Mayor of Charly. He then applied to become a professor at the School of Fine Arts in Lyon, supported by Ingres, but was unsuccessful.

His range then diversified to include printmaking, sculpture, and the new field of photography.

From 1850 he worked on a large fresco project for the Church of St. Martin in Ainay, but unfortunately moisture caused his work to deteriorate and his sponsors refused to pay. The work was ultimately destroyed. Embittered, Frénet didn't produce anything else before his death on 12 August 1889.

== Photography ==
Around 1850 Frénet, met some photography pioneers in Lyon, and used photography to record his unsuccessful frescoes at Ainay. From this time, he becomes passionate about this new medium, and this mentally diverts him from the setbacks with his painting.

Frénet applies to out of decision stereotypical views of the time involving heavy stagings, and is one of the first to practice the instant, the familiar and intimate subject. Five years before Nadar, it produces psychological portraits and engages in close-up. He considers photography as an art, that opinion has emerged in the first issue of The Light body of the young and ephemeral gravure Company founded in 1851. Frénet open professional practice of photography in 1866 and 1867 Lyon.

Unknown to the general public, his photographic work was discovered in 2000 at the sale of his photographic collection, where many parts are purchased by the Musée d'Orsay

== Family ==
Photographic evidences shows that he was married with three daughters.

== Notes and references ==
- Michel Régnier, Jean-Baptiste Frénet, 1814-1889, peintre et photographe, éditions La Taillanderie, 2002 (ISBN 2876292750)
- Notices d'autoritéVoir et modifier les données sur Wikidata : Fichier d'autorité international virtuel • International Standard Name Identifier • Union List of Artist Names • Bibliothèque nationale de France (données) • Système universitaire de documentation
- Works of Jean-Baptiste Frénet at Musée d'Orsay
