= Félix Thiollier =

French photographer (1842–1914)

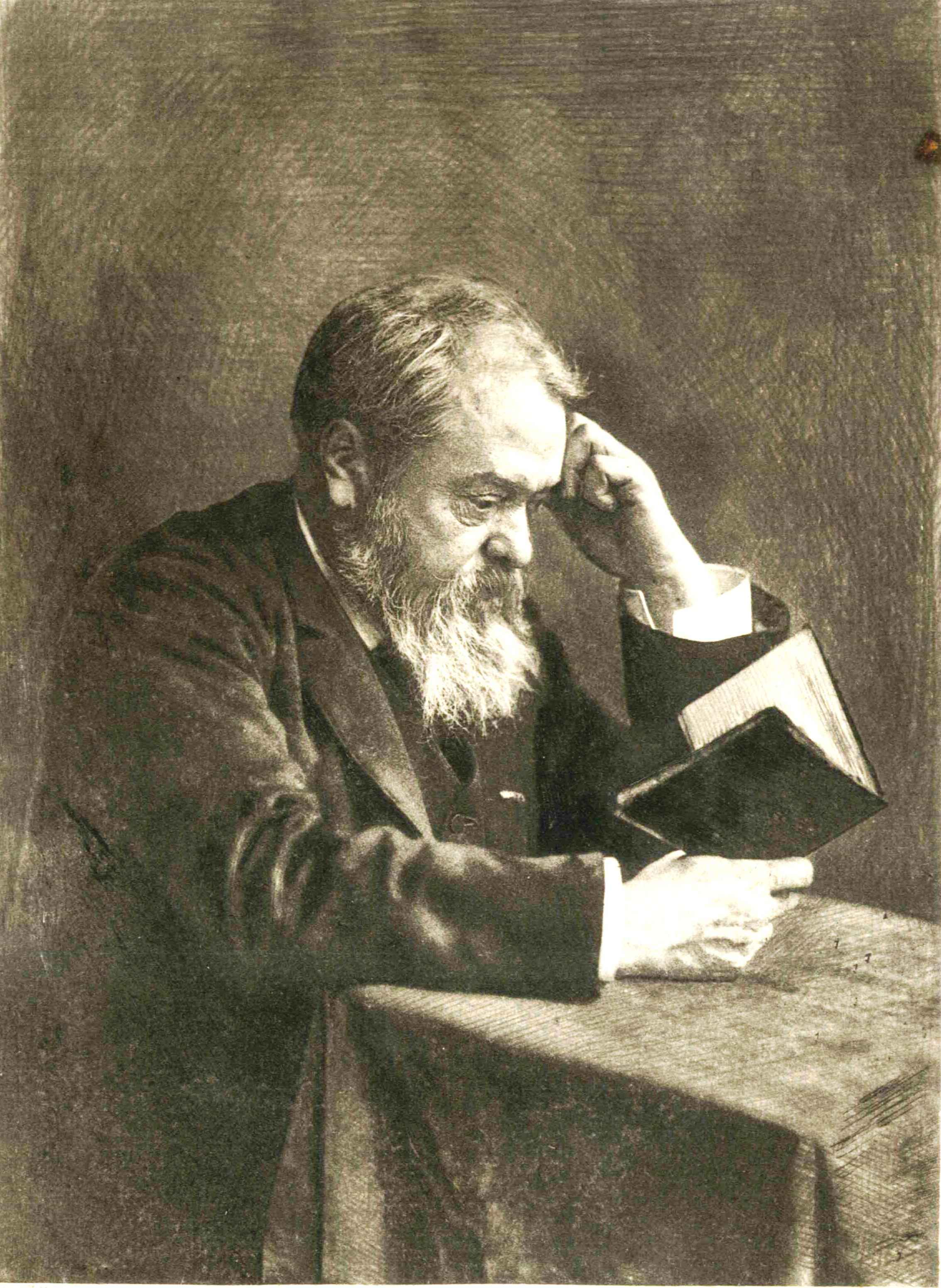
Félix Thiollier (ca. 1900)

Félix Thiollier (28 June 1842, Saint Étienne – 12 May 1914, Saint Étienne) was a French industrialist, writer, art collector and photographer.

His father, Claude Auguste, was a ribbon maker. In 1867, he started a ribbon company in Saint Étienne. At age 37, he retired, and pursued his interests in art, archeology, and photography. His photography was influenced by the work of Camille Corot, and he befriended François-Auguste Ravier, Paul Borel, Jean-Paul Laurens, and François Guiguet.

In 1870, he married Gabrielle Testenoire-Lafayette. They had five children.

== Gallery ==
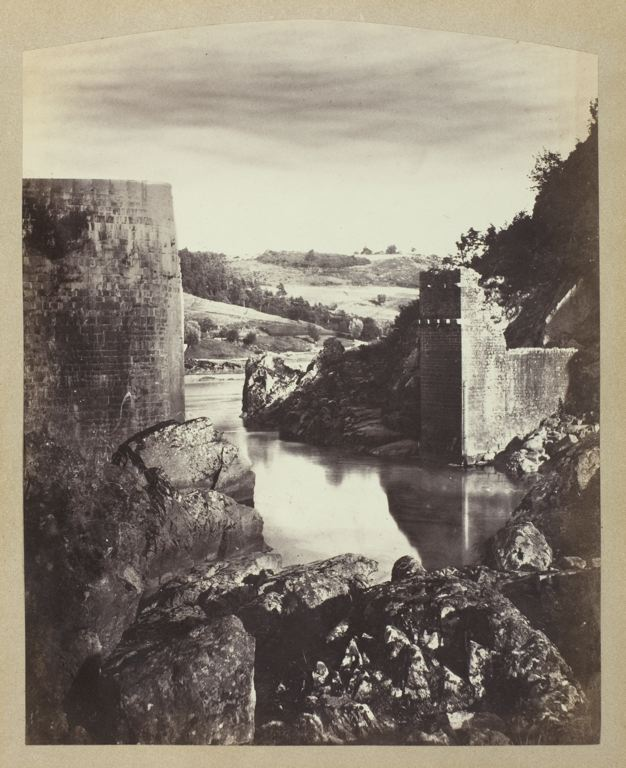
Landscape with Ruin, c. 1870

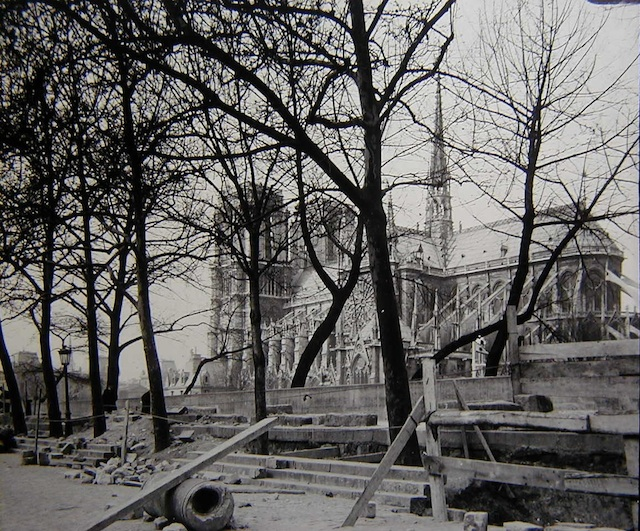
Notre Dame de Paris, c. 1900

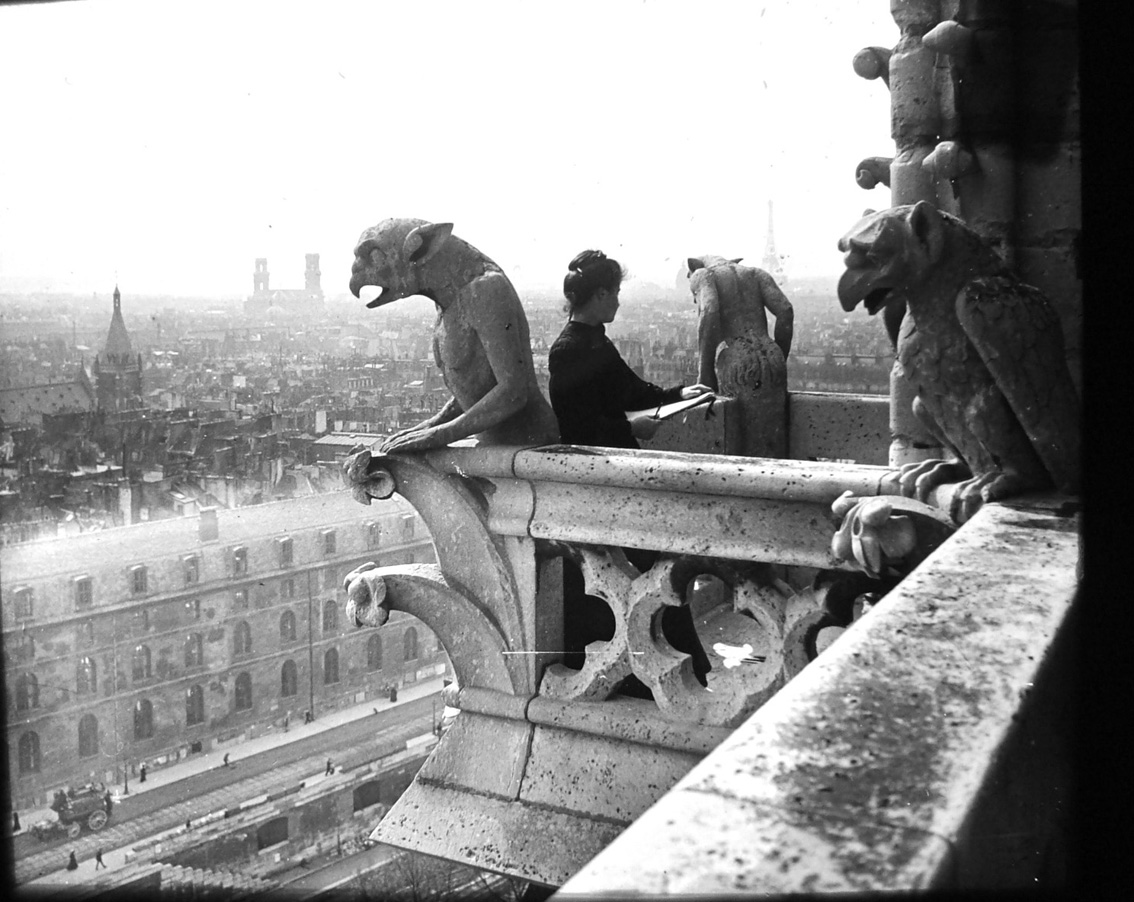
Thiollier's daughter Emma, a sculptor and painter, working at Notre Dame (1907).
