= François Guiguet =

French painter

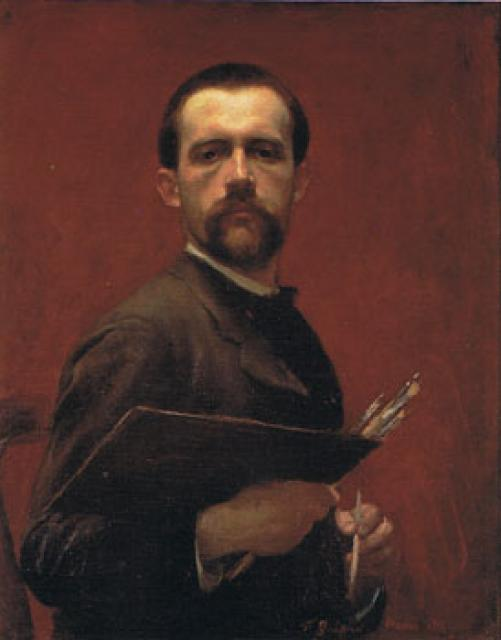
Self-portrait (1886)

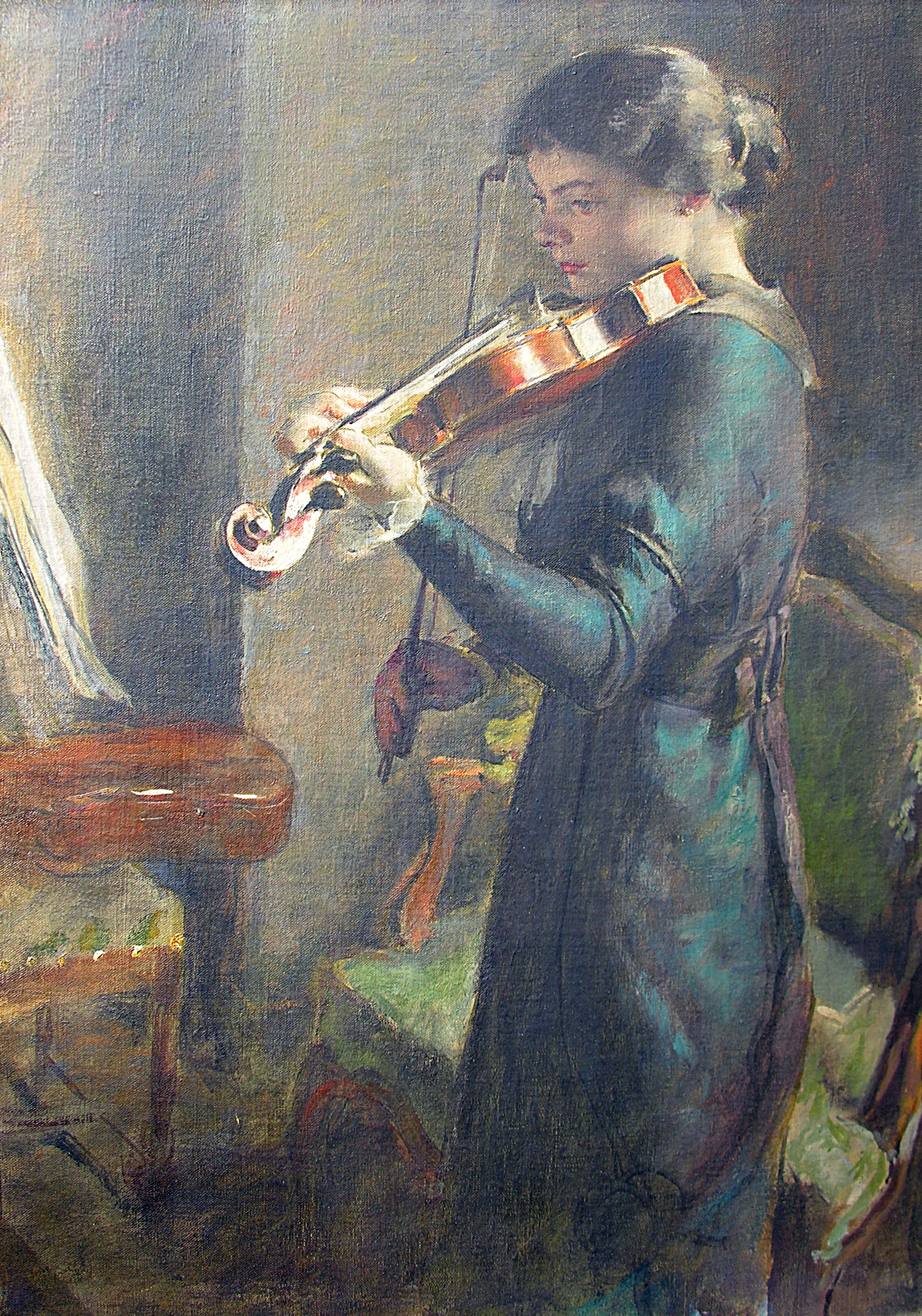
The Violinist (1914)

François Joseph Guiguet (8 January 1860 – 3 September 1937) was a French painter.

== Biography ==
He was born in Corbelin. His father was a joiner and he was the fifth of twelve children. Although he drew from an early age, it was intended that he would follow his father's trade. In 1876, however, the family doctor saw some his work and was impressed. He advised them to seek out the opinion of François-Auguste Ravier, a painter and former colleague of Camille Corot, who lived in the nearby village of Morestel. Ravier was also impressed and spent three years teaching Guiguet some of the basics of art to prepare him for entry into the École nationale des beaux-arts de Lyon.

In 1879, on Ravier's recommendation, he was enrolled in the class of Michel Dumas, a former student of Ingres, who schooled him in the Classical tradition. With the support of Édouard Aynard, director of the museum commission, and Antonin Dubost, the Deputy from Isère, Guiguet went to Paris to complete his studies at the École des Beaux-arts, where he worked in the studios of Alexandre Cabanel. While there, he also became a friend of Puvis de Chavannes and Félix Thiollier, who also had a great influence on his work, despite not being a painter. Guiguet made his debut at the Salon in 1885.

He specialized in painting woman and children, frequently returned to his hometown seeking inspiration and exhibited widely, including England, the United States, Germany and even Réunion. In 1910, he received the Légion d'honneur.

After 1914, he spent more time in Corbelin and died at his home there. The François Guiguet Municipal Museum opened in 1989, with a collection of 78 oils, 13 watercolors and over 3,500 drawings, donated by Louis Guiguet (his nephew). It closed in 2011.
