= The Poem of the Soul =

Painting series by Louis Janmot

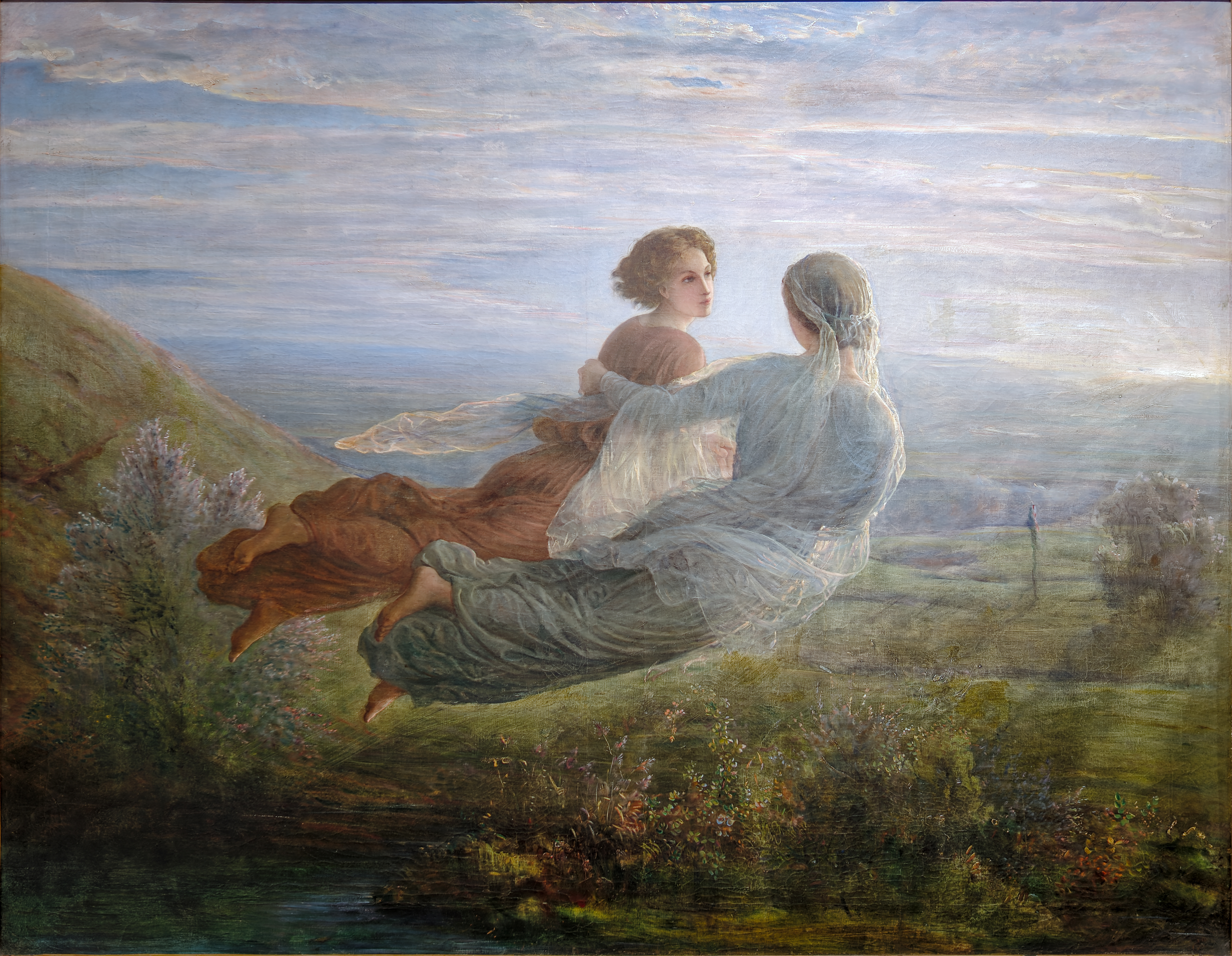
Painting 16 in the series, The Flight of the Soul

The Poem of the Soul is a series of oil on canvas paintings by Louis Janmot, produced between 1835 and 1881 and totalling eighteen paintings and sixteen charcoal drawings, all inspired by a 2800 verse poem by Janmot himself. The first works in the series were exhibited at the Salon of 1855 during the Exposition Universelle in Paris. The series tells of a soul's life on earth, incarnated in a young man, accompanied by his female double. His companion then disappears and he spends the rest of his life alone, as did the artist. The series is now in the Museum of Fine Arts of Lyon.

== Sources ==
- "Le Poème de l'âme - L'idéal - Musée des Beaux Arts de Lyon". mba-lyon.fr.
