= François-Auguste Ravier =

French painter (1814–1895)

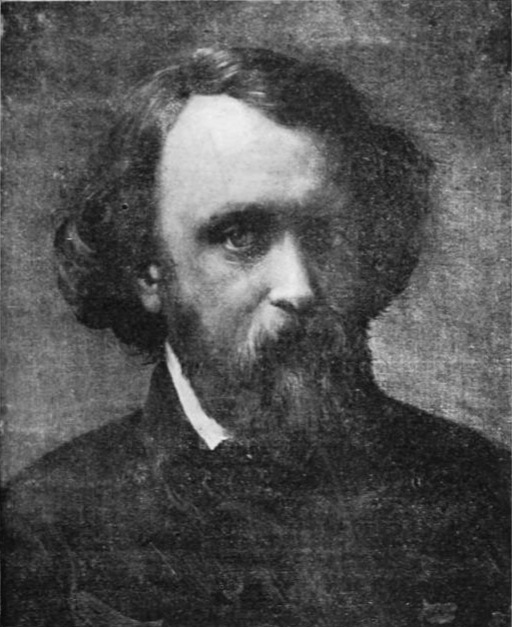
François-Auguste Ravier; portrait by Louis Janmot

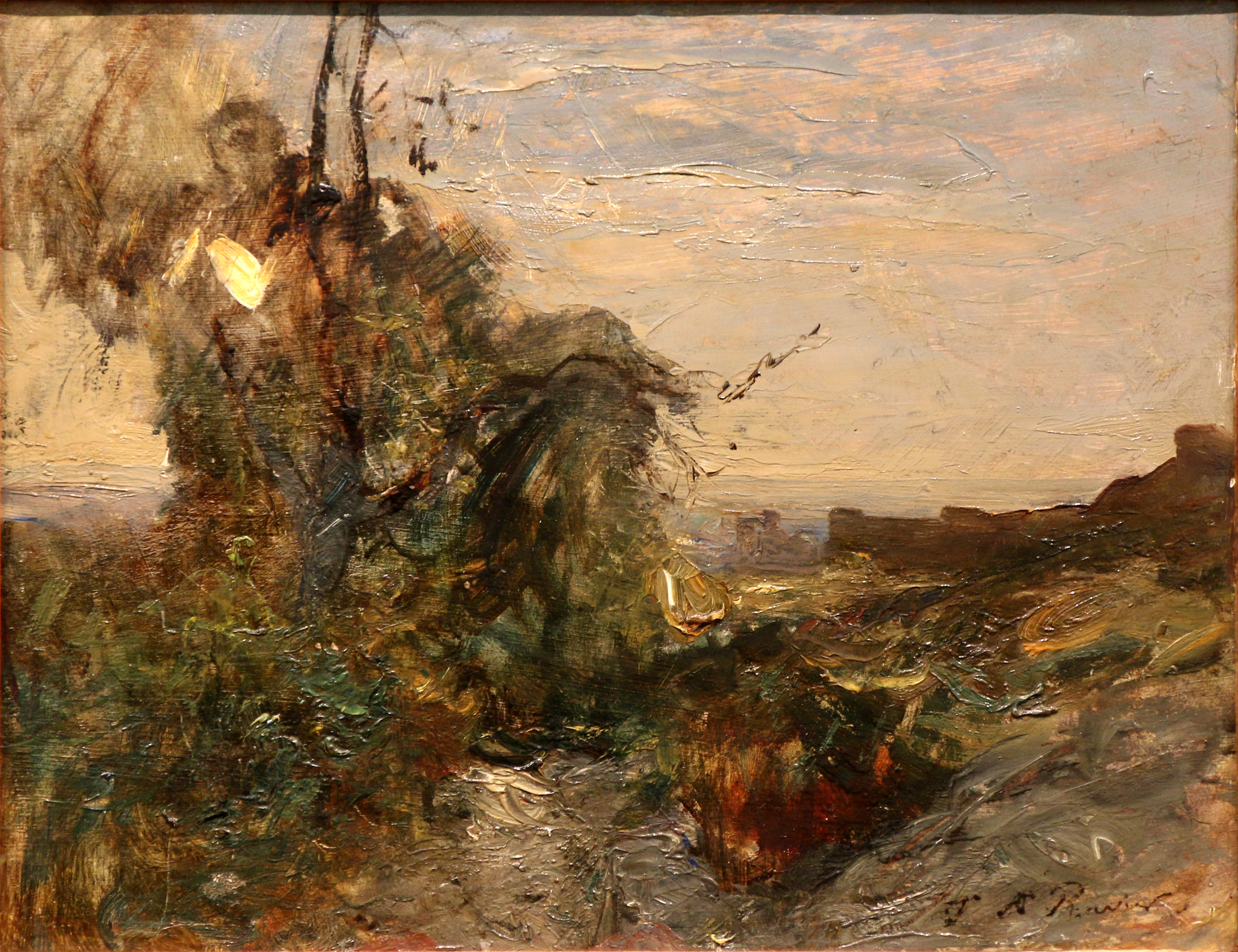
View of Crémieu

François-Auguste Ravier (4 May 1814 – 26 June 1895) was a French landscape painter.

== Biography ==
He was born in Lyon. His parents encouraged him to prepare for a legal career, so he went to Paris. While studying law, from 1833 to 1839, he also devoted himself to painting; enrolling at the École des Beaux-Arts, where he studied with Théodore Caruelle d'Aligny. In 1835, he visited Royat, and became acquainted with Jean-Baptiste Camille Corot, who had a great influence on his early style.

From 1840 to 1845, at the urging of Corot, he worked in Italy, where he mingled with the French art community. Although he spent most of his time wandering through the countryside painting, he apparently never exhibited his works there. After returning to France, he settled in Crémieu until 1868, when he moved to Morestel, attracted by the lighting and impressive, isolated landscapes.

Many young painters were interested in his experimental techniques, and went there to seek his advice. Much later, these artists were grouped together and called the "École de Morestel". François Guiguet, whom he met in 1876 is, perhaps, the best remembered among this group.

In his final decade, Ravier suffered from a progressive blindness. It was said that he had "looked at the sun too much". He died in Morestel in 1895.

In addition to Corot, Ravier was a great admirer of the English painter, J. M. W. Turner. Due to his innovative methods of mixing colors, he is sometimes considered to be an early Impressionist.
