= Louis Janmot =

French painter

Anne-François-Louis Janmot
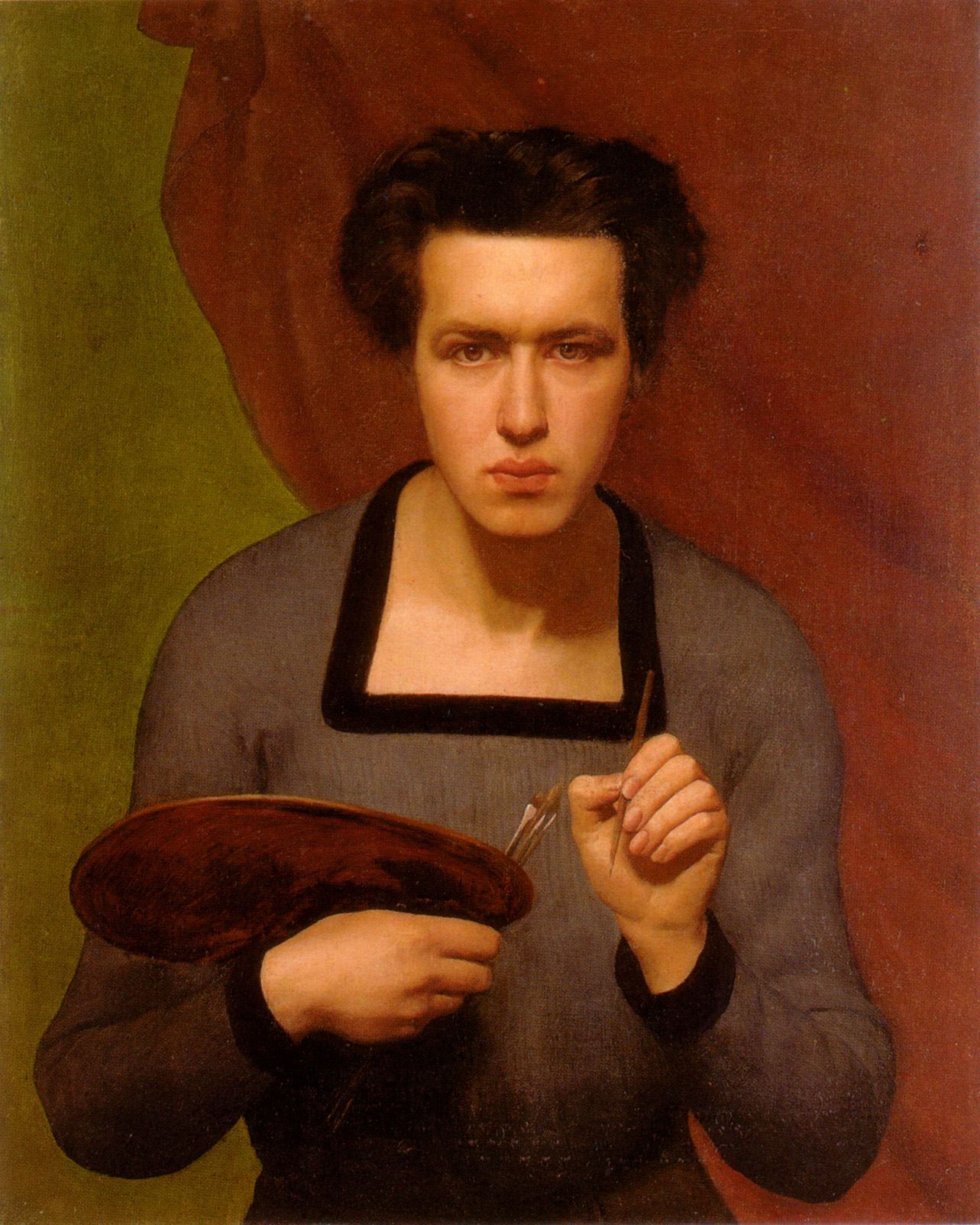
- Louis Janmot (self-portrait, 1832)
- Born: 21 May 1814; Lyon, France
- Died: 1 June 1892 (aged 78); Lyon, France
- Education: Royal College of Lyon; École des Beaux-Arts de Lyon
- Spouse(s): Leonie Saint-Paulet (1855–1870); Antoinette Currat (1885–1892)

Anne-François-Louis Janmot (English: /ʒɑːnˈmoʊ/ zhahn-MOH, French: [an fʁɑ̃swa lwi ʒɑ̃mo]; 21 May 1814 – 1 June 1892) was a French painter and poet.

== Early years ==
Janmot was born in Lyon, France, of Catholic parents who were deeply religious. He was extremely moved by the death of his brother in 1823 and his sisters in 1829. He became a student at the Royal College of Lyon where he met Frederic Ozanam and other followers of his philosophy professor, Abbe Noirot. In 1831 he was admitted to the École des Beaux-Arts de Lyon and a year later, he won the highest honor, the Golden Laurel. In 1833, he came to Paris to take painting lessons from Victor Orsel and Jean-Auguste-Dominique Ingres. With other Lyon painters, he entered the Society of St. Vincent de Paul. In 1835, he went to Rome with Claudius Lavergne, Jean-Baptiste Frénet and other students and met Hippolyte Flandrin.

After his return to Lyon in 1836, Janmot would attract the attention of critics of the Salon de Paris in conducting large-scale paintings with religious inspiration such as The Resurrection of the son of the widow of Nain (1839) or Christ in Gethsemane (1840). After 1845, he attracted the interest of Charles Baudelaire with his painting Flower of the Fields that allowed him to access to the Salon of 1846. Theophile Gautier was impressed by his Portrait of Lacordaire (1846). But the failure of his Poem of the Soul at the Universal Exhibition of 1855 disappointed him. In December of that year he married Leonie Saint-Paulet, from a noble family in Carpentras.

In 1856, Janmot obtained a commission to paint a fresco (since destroyed) representing the Last Supper for the church of St. Polycarp. Other orders followed, including the decoration of the dome of the Church of St. Francis de Sales and for the town hall that had been renovated by his friend the architect T. Desjardins. He was then appointed professor at the École des Beaux-Arts.

== In Paris and Toulon ==
Janmot moved to Paris in 1861 after having been promised a commission for the Church of St. Augustine, but this project was abandoned three years later. In experiencing significant family and financial problems, Janmot accepted a professorship at the Dominican School of Arcueil. At that time, in his home in Bagneux, he made many portraits of the members of his family (only photographs are currently available).

After the birth of her seventh child in August 1870, his wife died in Bagneux. While the Prussian troops approached and occupied his home, he fled to Algiers with his stepfather and made landscape paintings. He returned in June of the following year in Paris and led a solitary life. His house in Bagneux had been looted. In 1878, he produced a fresco in the chapel of the Franciscans in the Holy Land, but this work was not followed by any further commission.

Faced with family and increasing financial problems, Janmot came to Toulon, and despite some orders (new Portrait of Lacordaire (1878, Museum of Versailles), Rosaire (Saint-Germain-en-Laye, 1880), Martyrdom of St. Christine (Solliès-Pont, 1882), he lived a retired life. He finished the second part of the Poem of the Soul that the patron and former industrial Félix Thiollier was willing to publish.

In 1885, Janmot married a former student, Antoinette Currat, and returned to Lyon. He made charcoal drawings on the theme of the underworld, which can be regarded as a kind of continuation of the Poem of the Soul, including Purgatory (1885) and The End of Time (1888). In 1887 was published in Lyon and Paris a book of more than 500 pages book entitled Opinion of an artist on art that includes articles previously written by Janmot. He died five years later at the age of 78.

== Art style ==
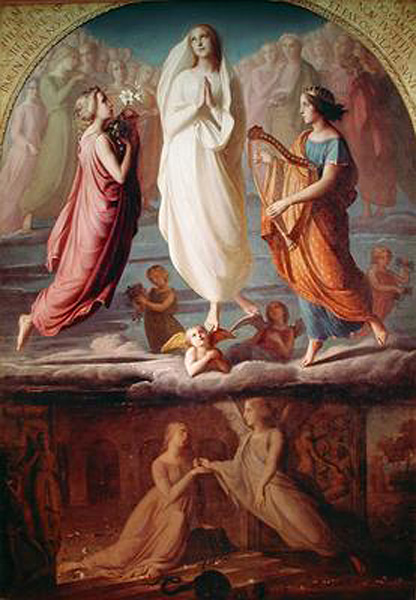
L'Assomption de la Vierge

Janmot has been seen as a transitional figure between Romanticism and Symbolism, prefiguring the French part of the Pre-Raphaelite Brotherhood; his work was admired by Puvis de Chavannes, Odilon Redon, and Maurice Denis.

Like Jean-Hippolyte Flandrin, another painter from Lyon and student of Ingres, Janmot carried out many commissions for church decorations. In his paintings the immaculate finish of Ingres was combined with a mysticism that has parallels in the work of his contemporaries the Nazarenes and the Pre-Raphaelites.

== Works ==
=== Poem of the Soul ===
His most significant work, a cycle of 18 paintings and 16 drawings, with verse, called The Poem of the Soul, occupied him for 40 years.

First part : the paintings		Second part : the drawings
1.	Génération divine	19.	Solitude
2.	Le Passage des âmes	20.	L’Infini
3.	L’Ange et la mère	21.	Rêve de feu
4.	Le Printemps	22.	Amour
5.	Souvenir du ciel	23.	Adieu
6.	Le Toit paternel	24.	Le Doute
7.	Le Mauvais Sentier	25.	L’Esprit du Mal
8.	Cauchemar	26.	L’Orgie
9.	Le Grain de blé	27.	Sans Dieu
10.	Première Communion	28.	Le Fantôme
11.	Virginitas	29.	Chute fatale
12.	L’Échelle d’or	30.	Le Supplice de Mézence
13.	Rayons de soleil	31.	Les Générations du Mal
14.	Sur la Montagne	32.	Intercession maternelle
15.	Un Soir	33.	La Délivrance, ou vision de l’avenir
16.	Le Vol de l’âme	34.	Sursum Corda
17.	L’Idéal
18.	Réalité

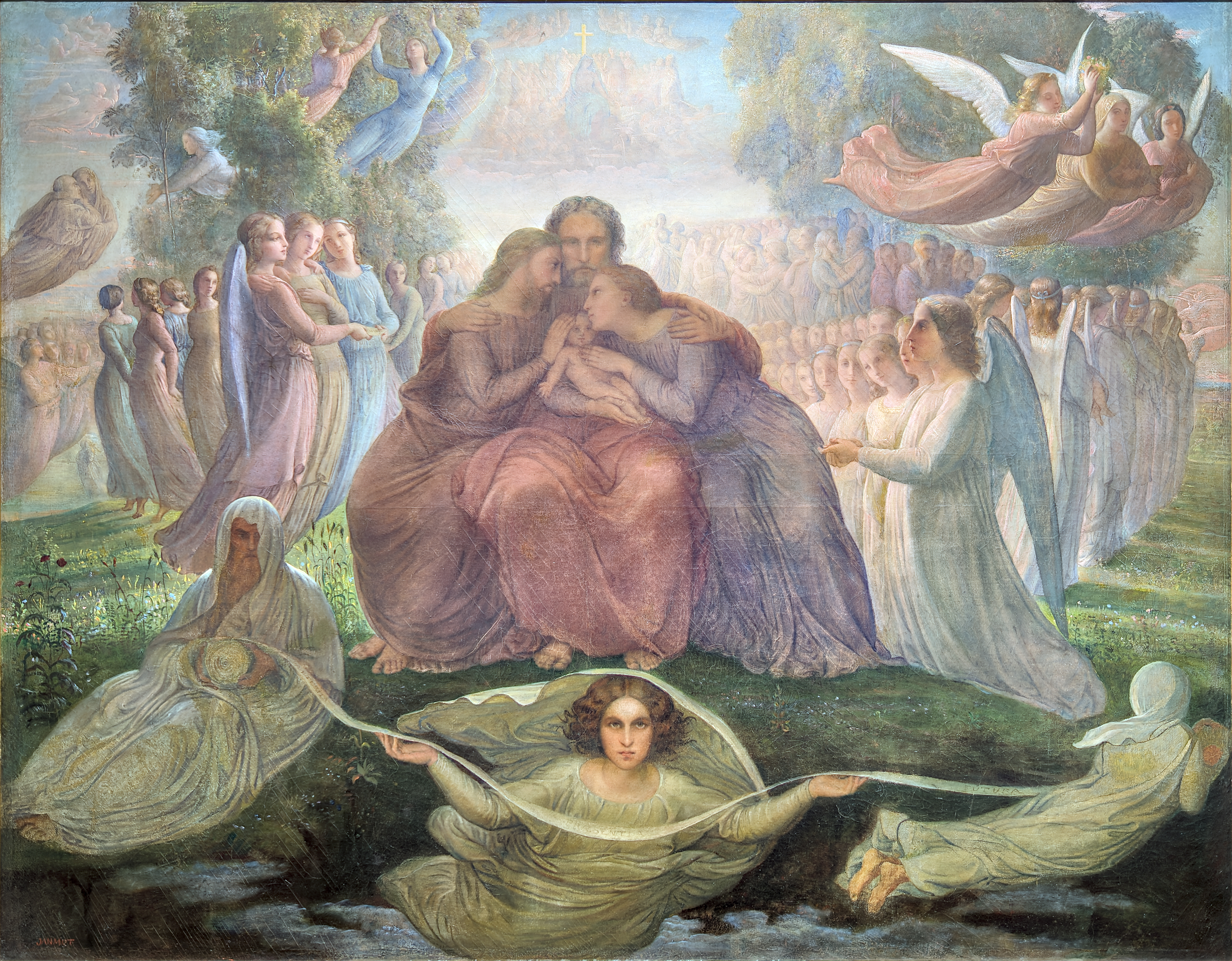
1. Génération divine

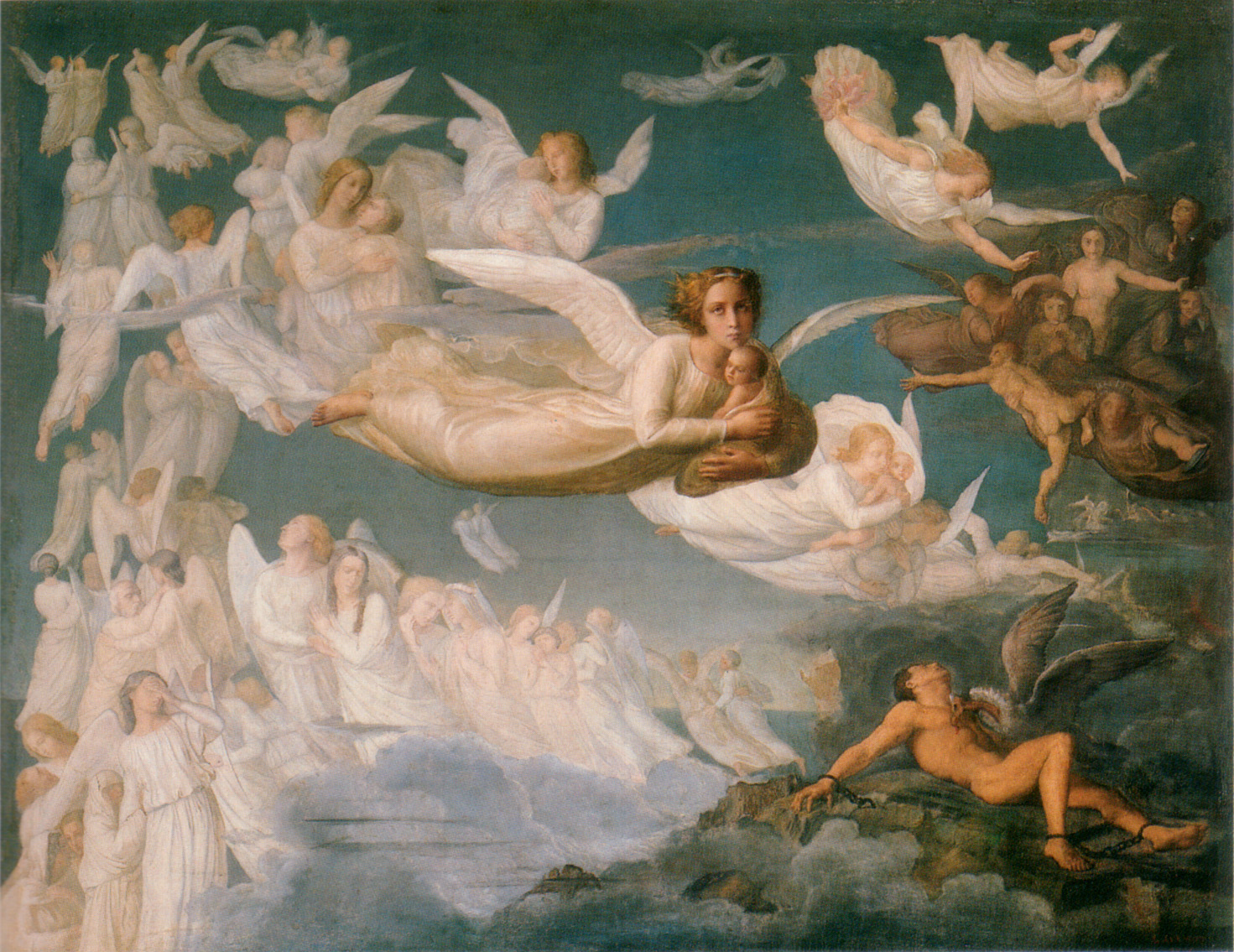
2. Le Passage des âmes

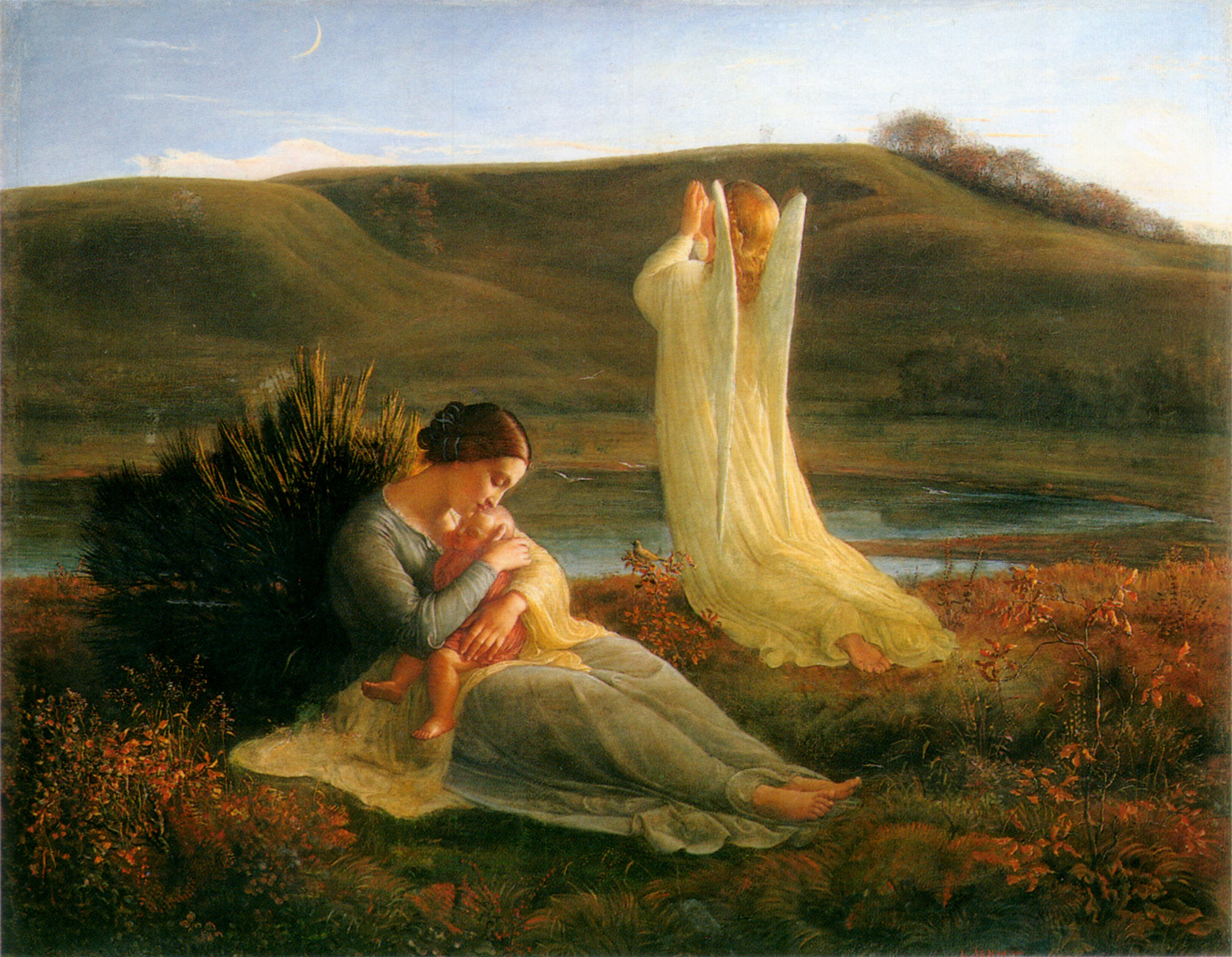
3. L’Ange et la mère

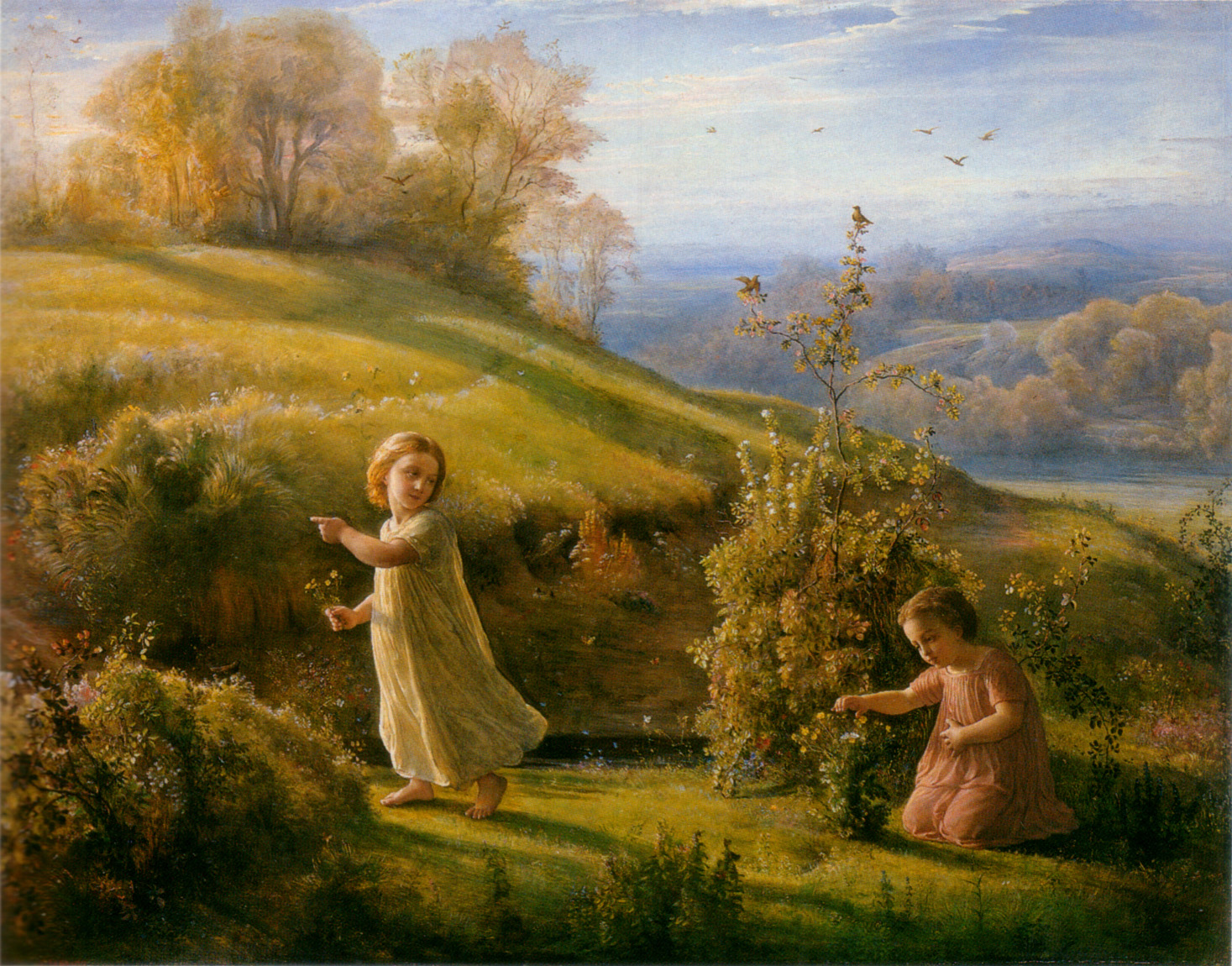
4. Le Printemps

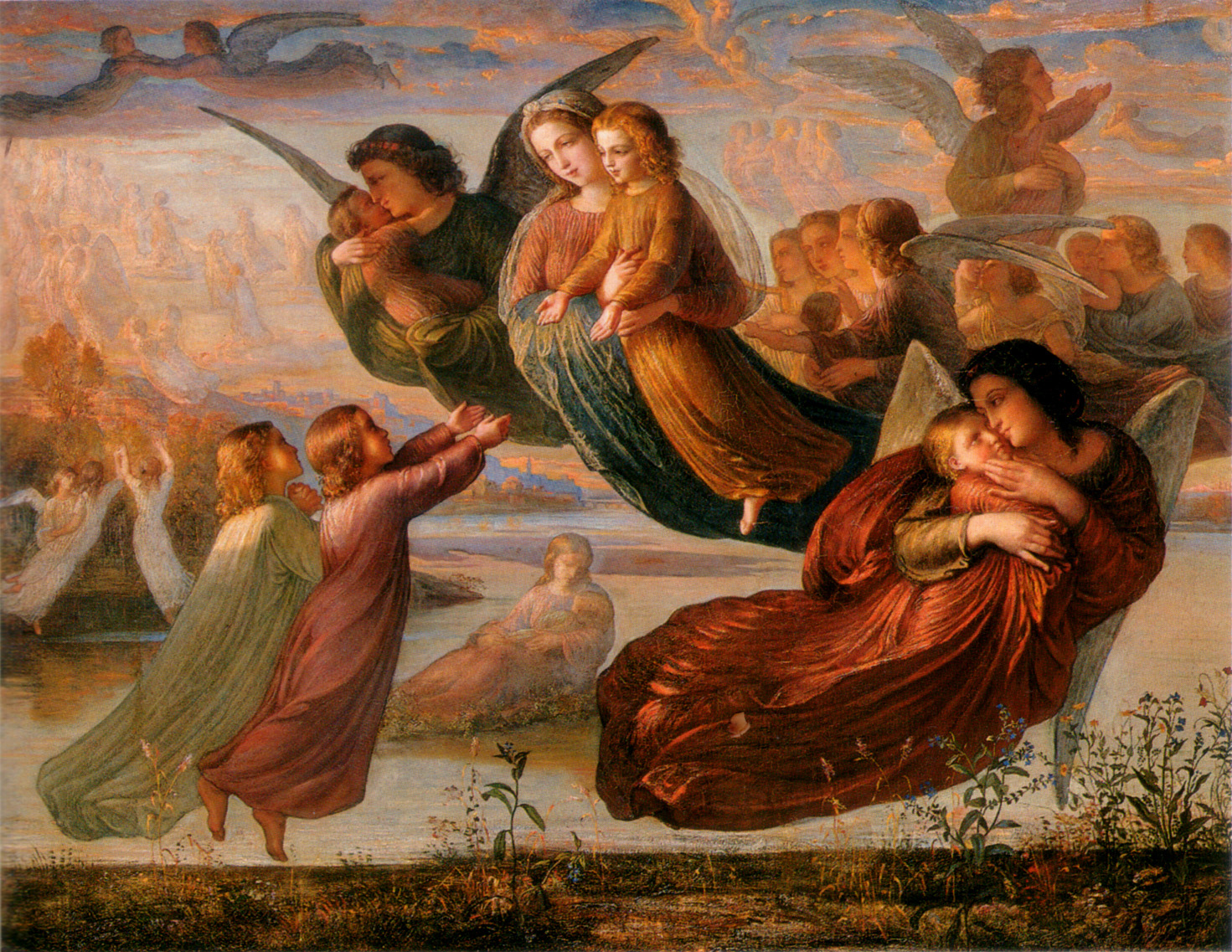
5. Souvenir du ciel

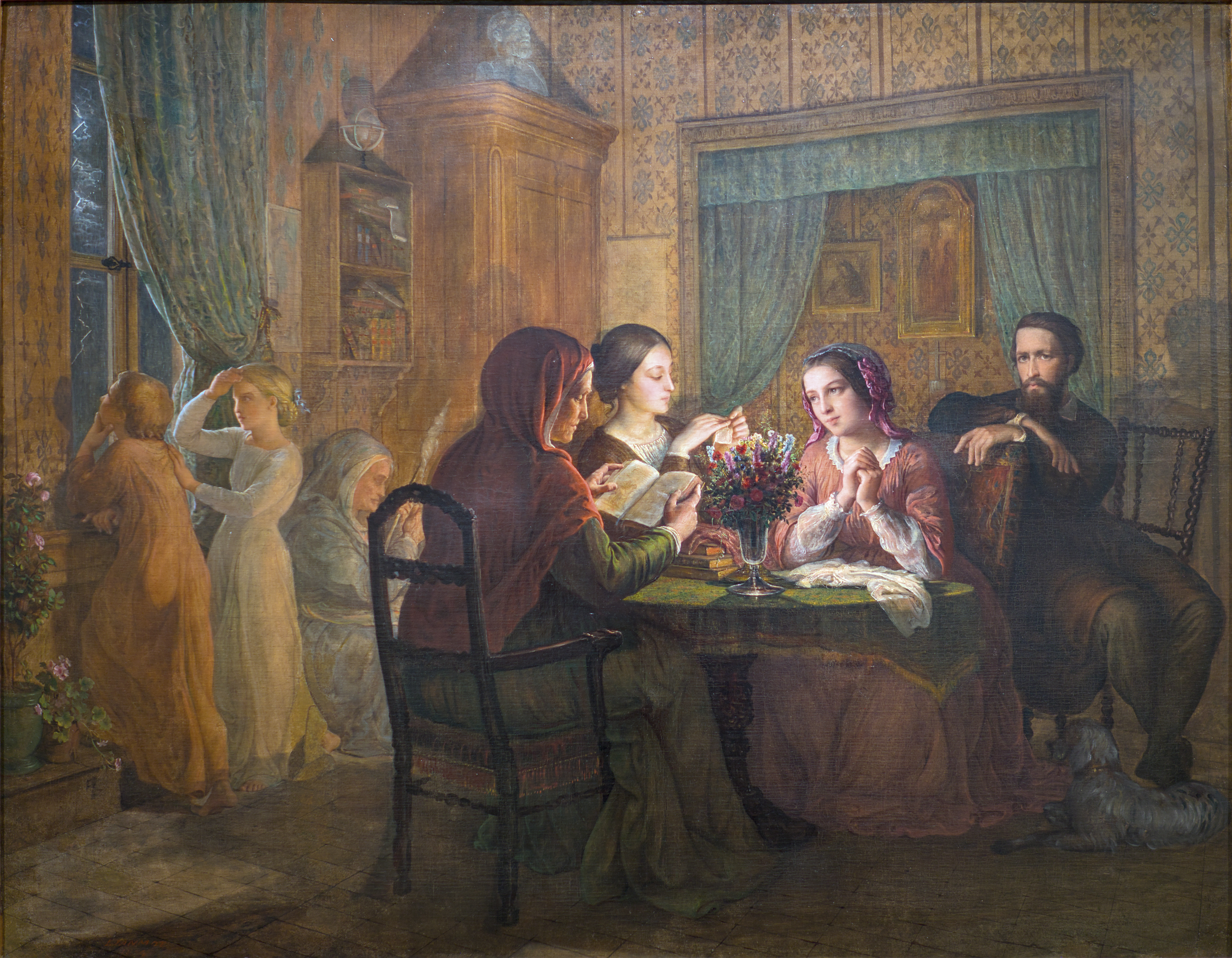
6. Le Toit paternel

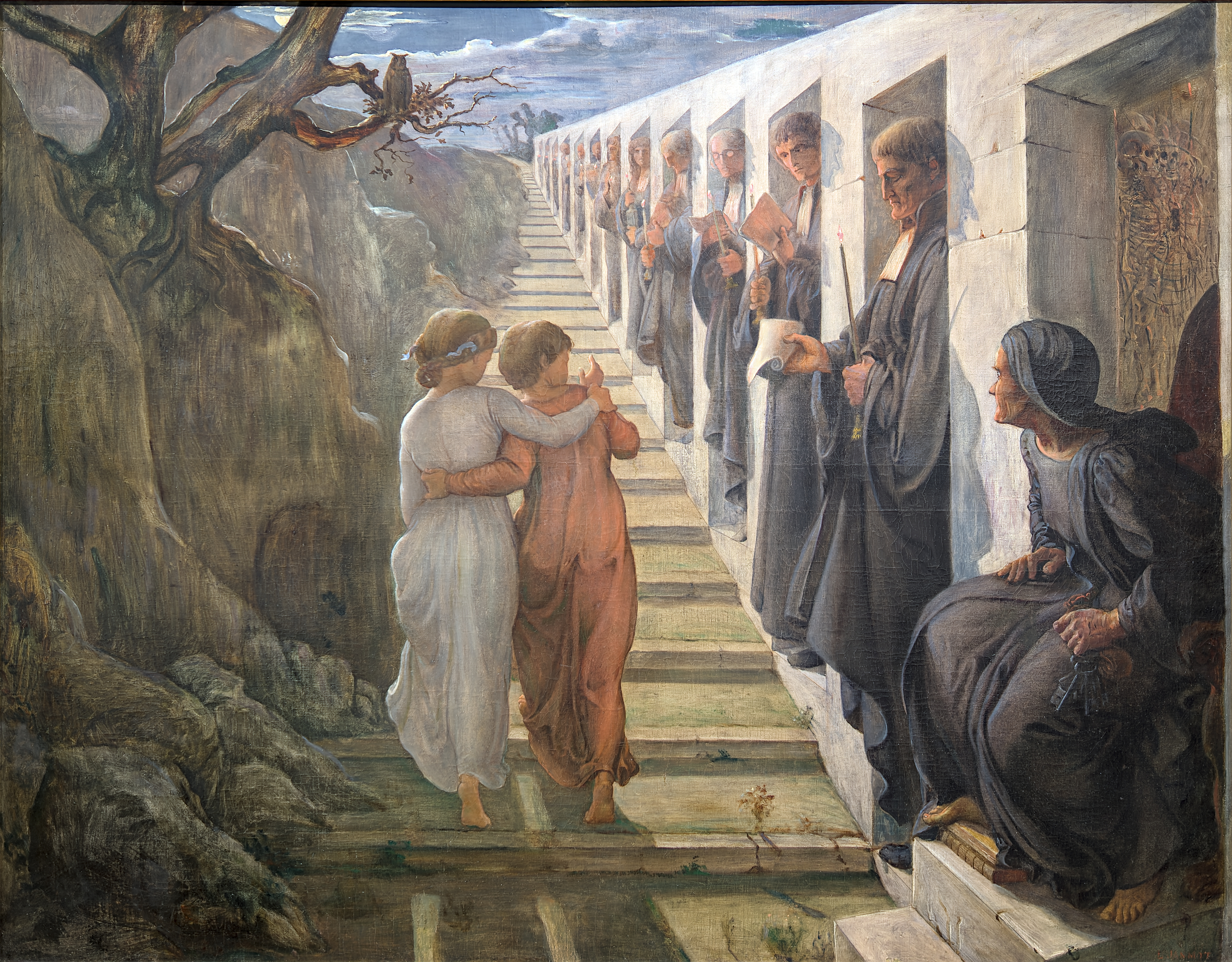
7. Le Mauvais Sentier

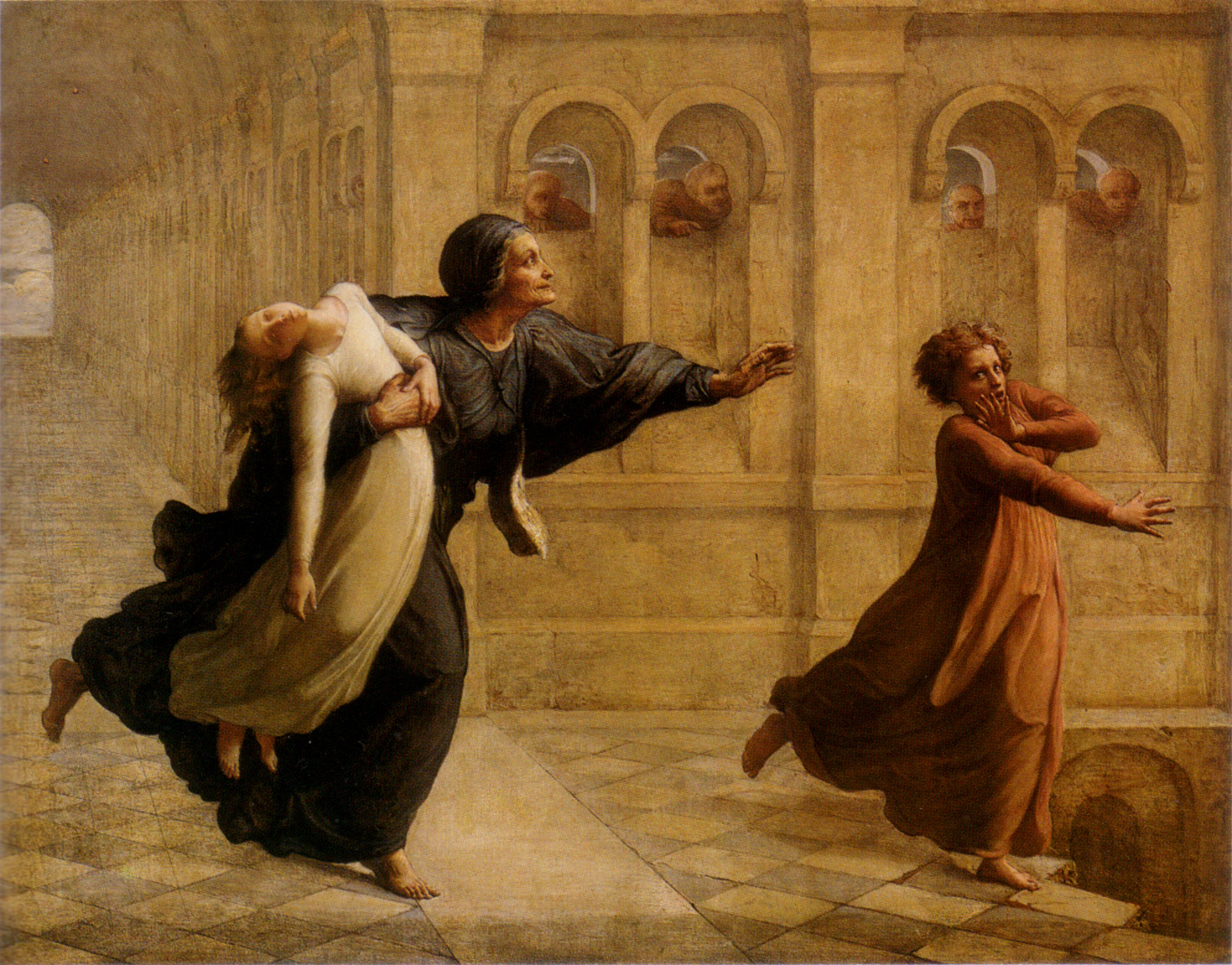
8. Cauchemar

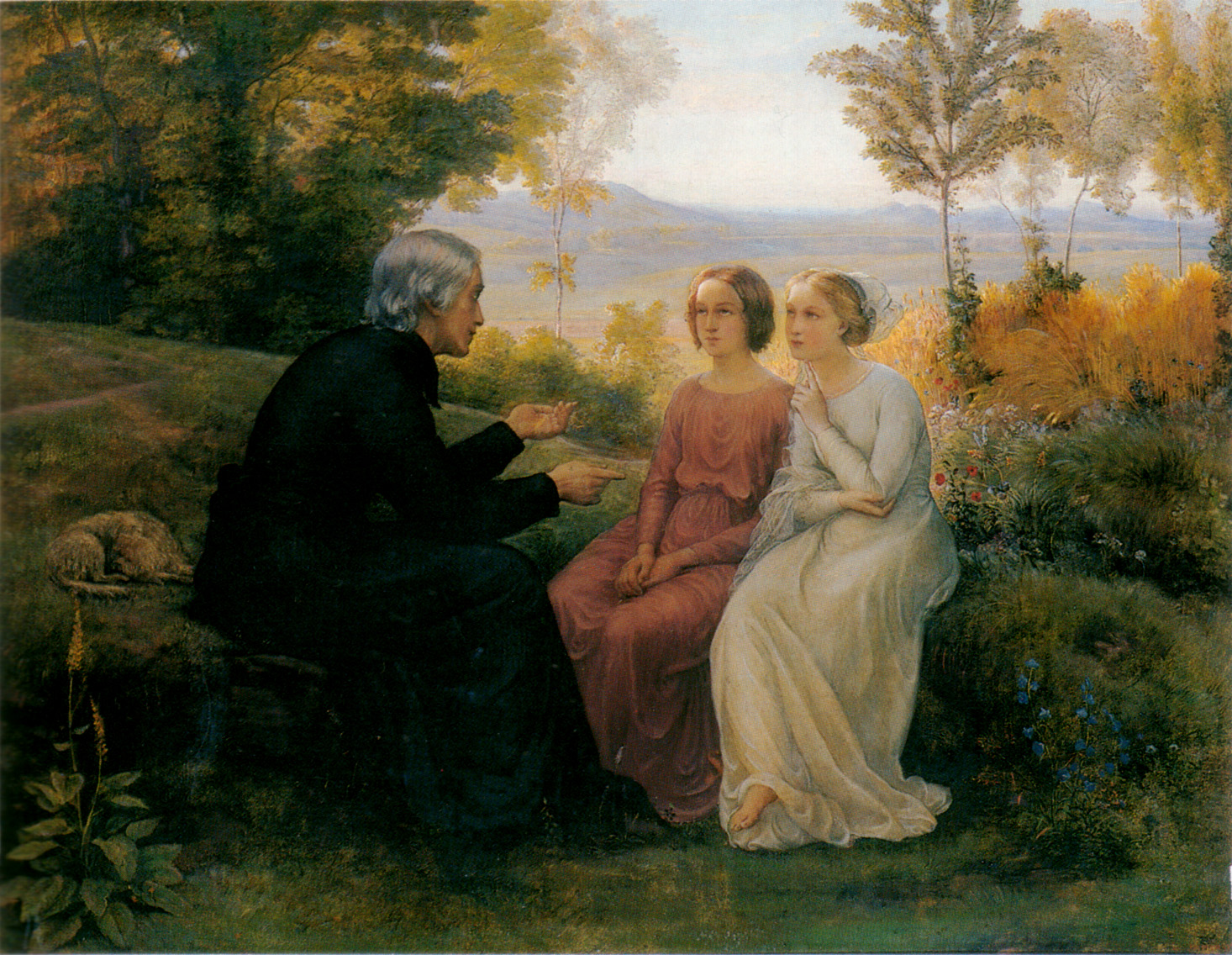
9. Le Grain de blé

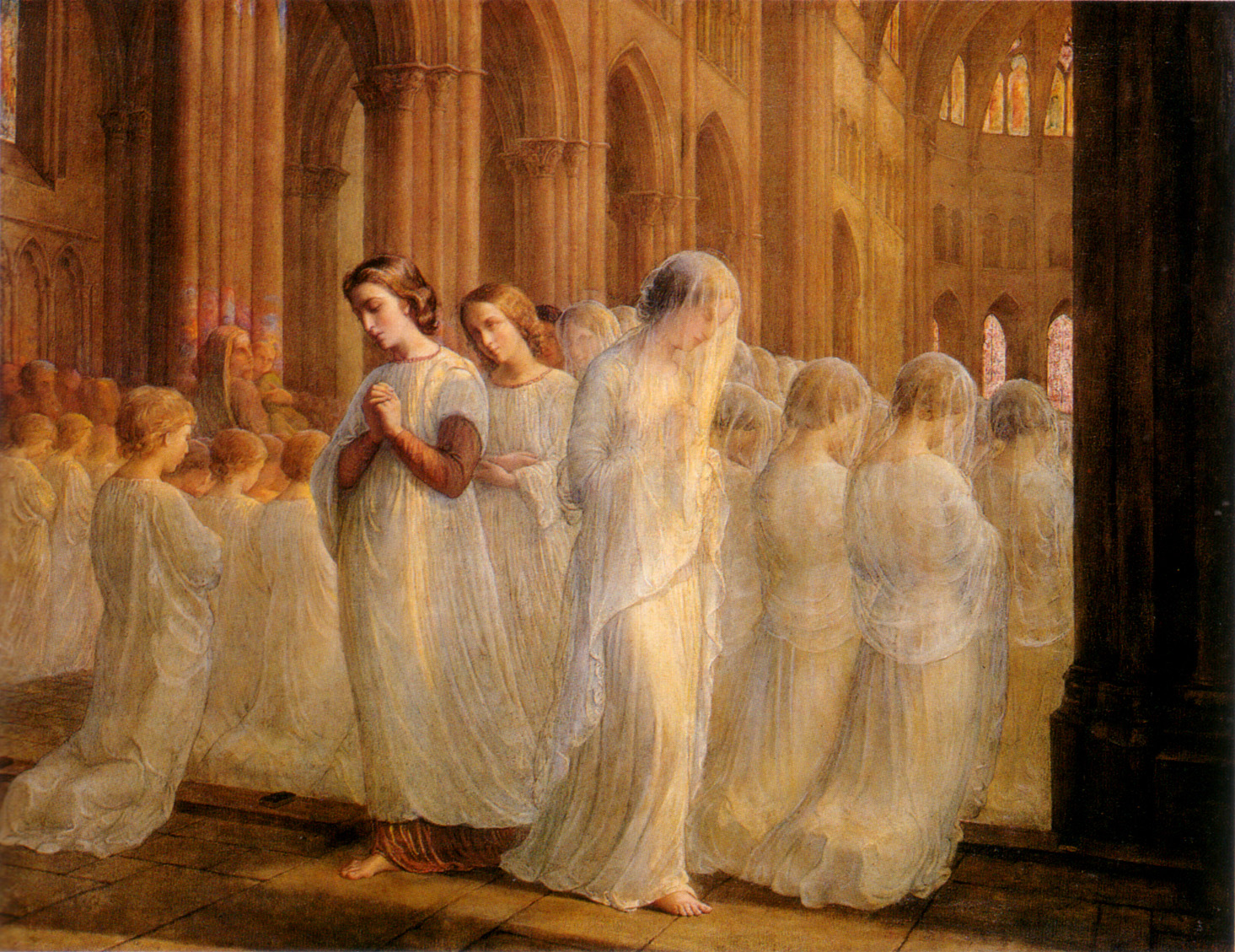
10. Première Communion

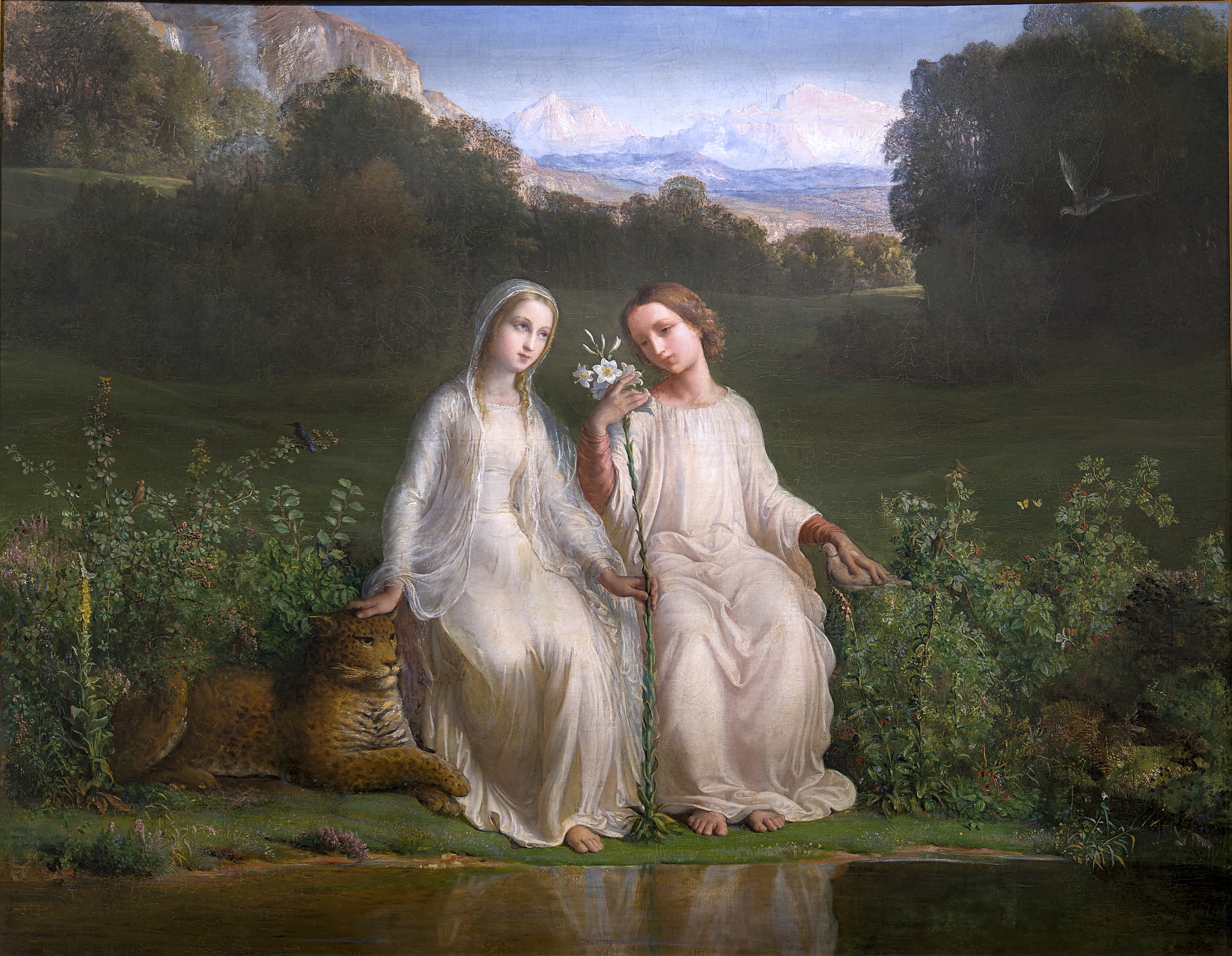
11. Virginitas

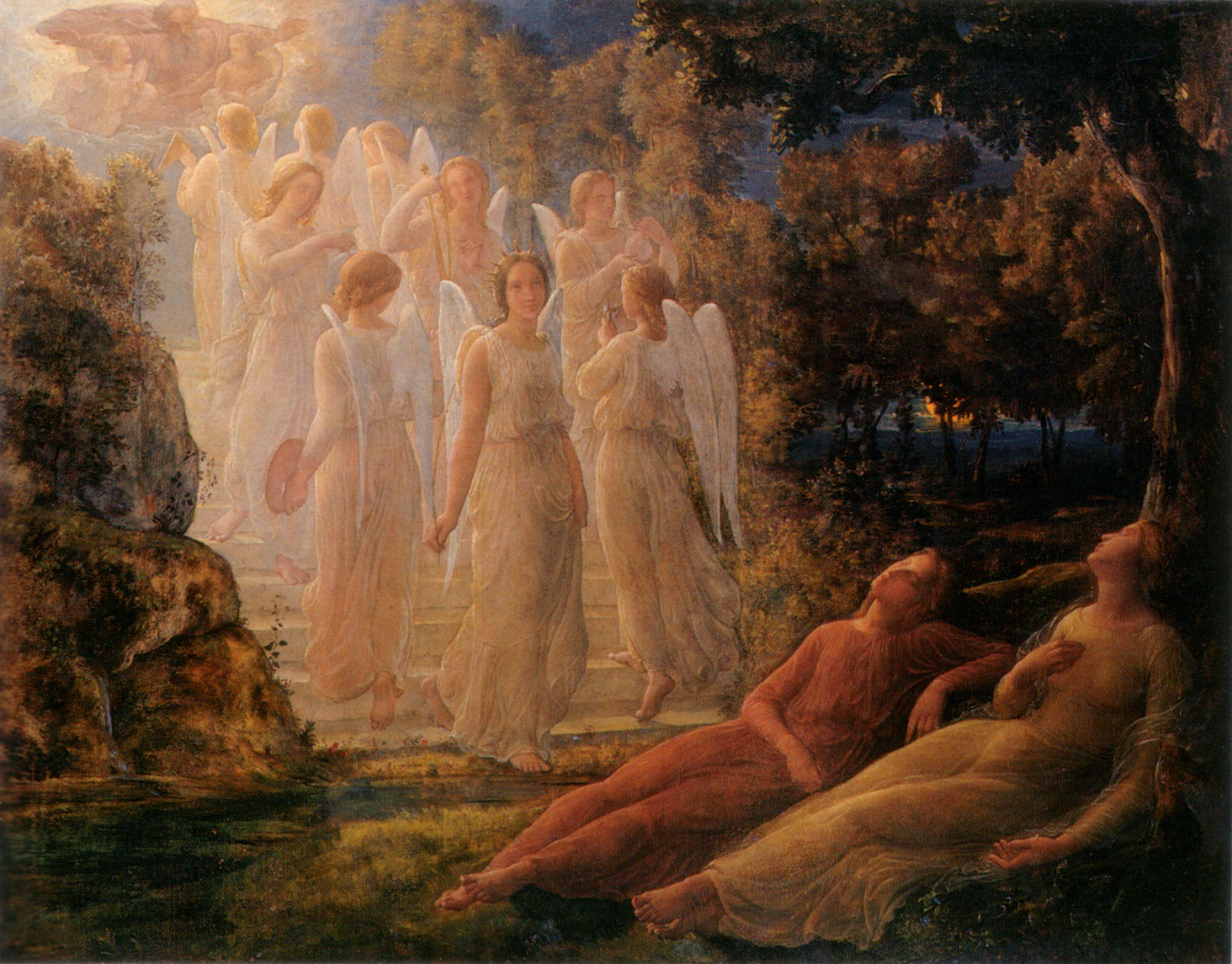
12. L’Échelle d’or

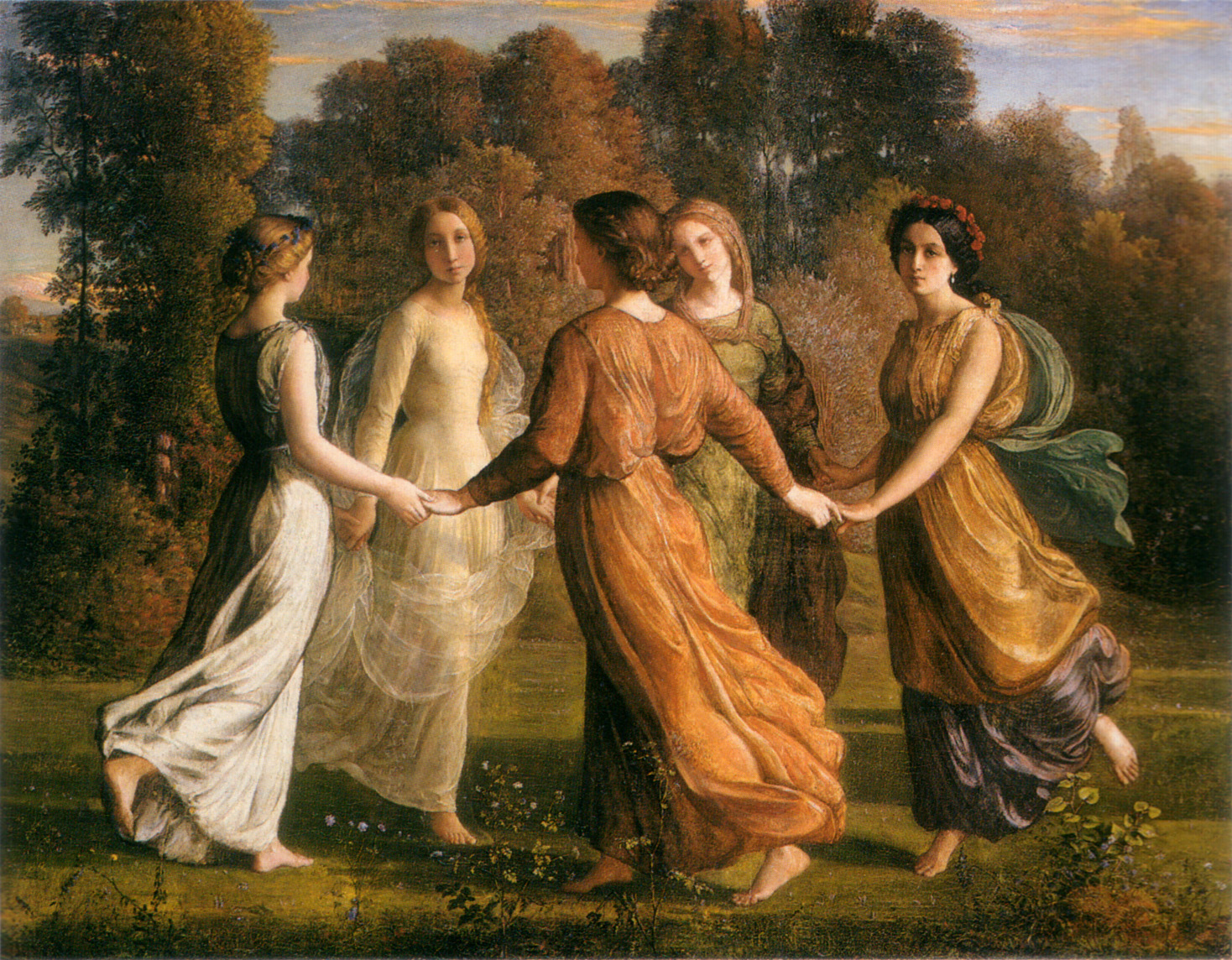
13. Rayons de soleil

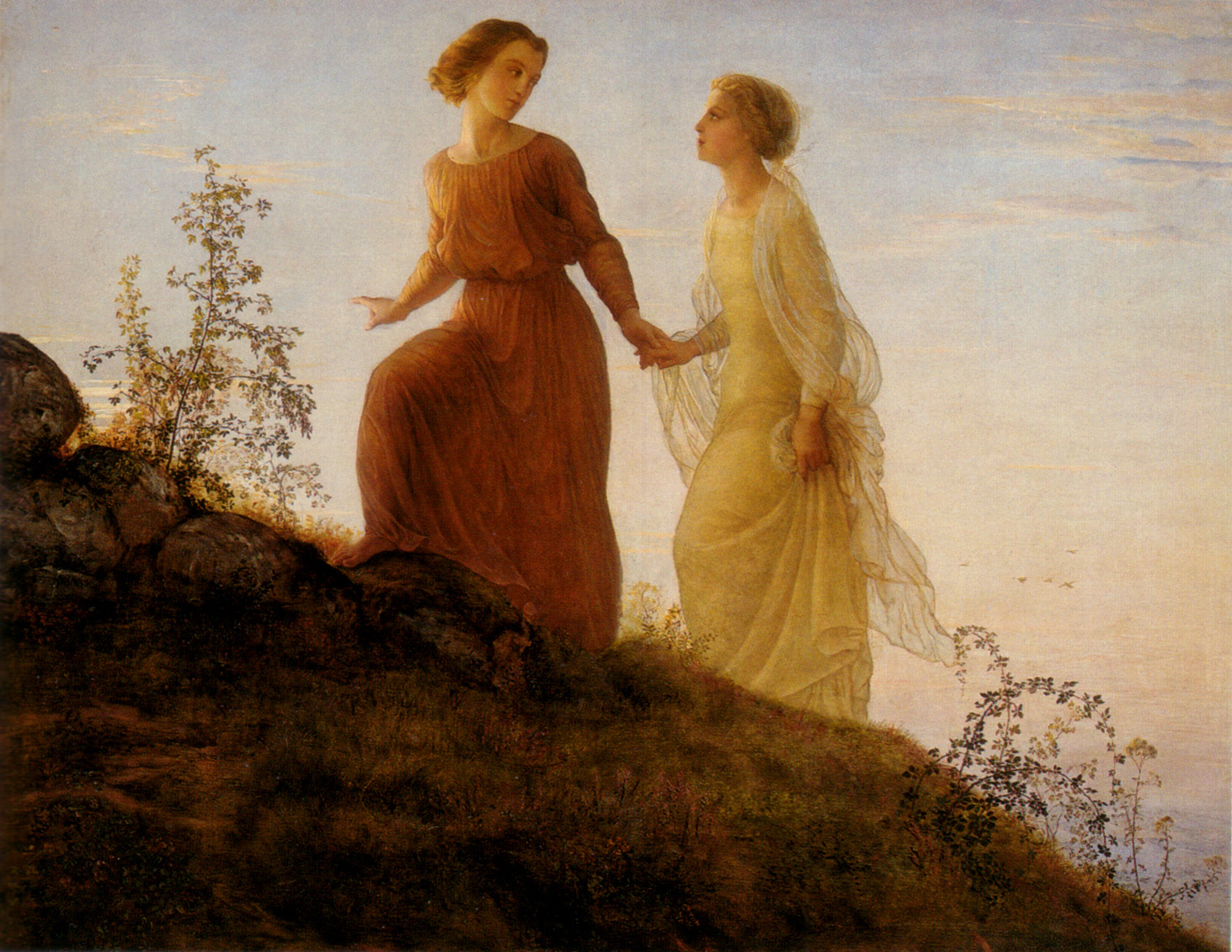
14. Sur la Montagne

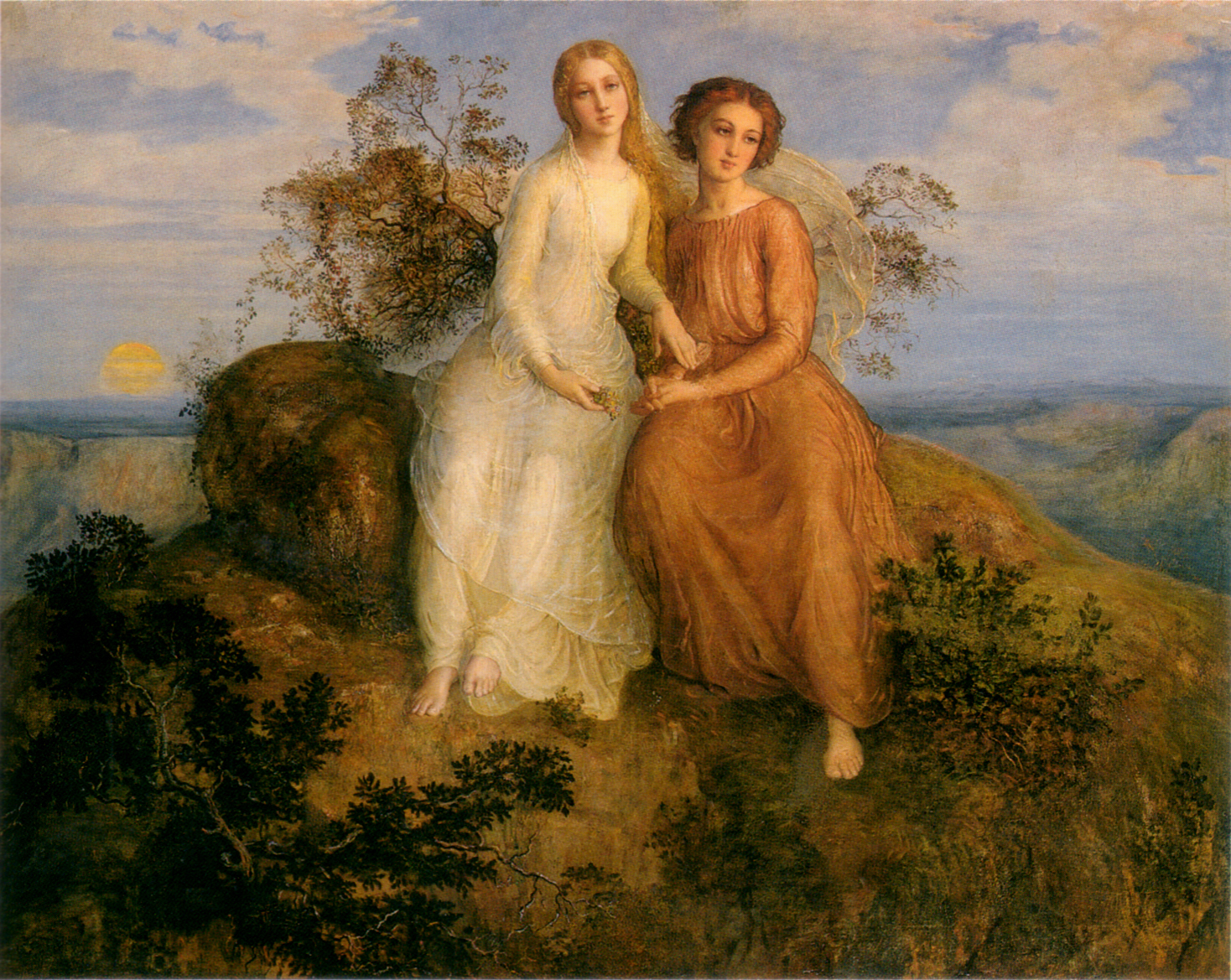
15. Un Soir

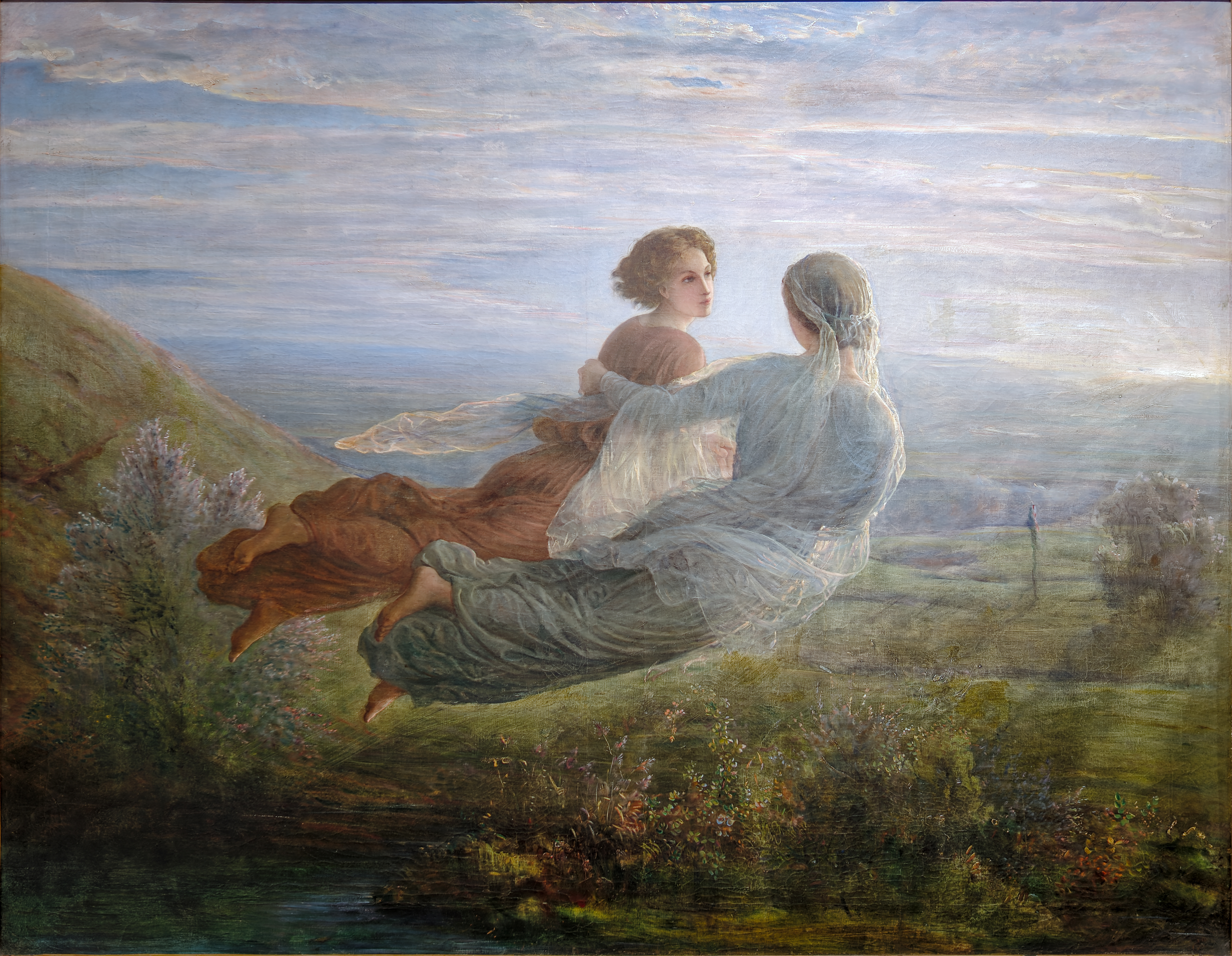
16. Le Vol de l’âme

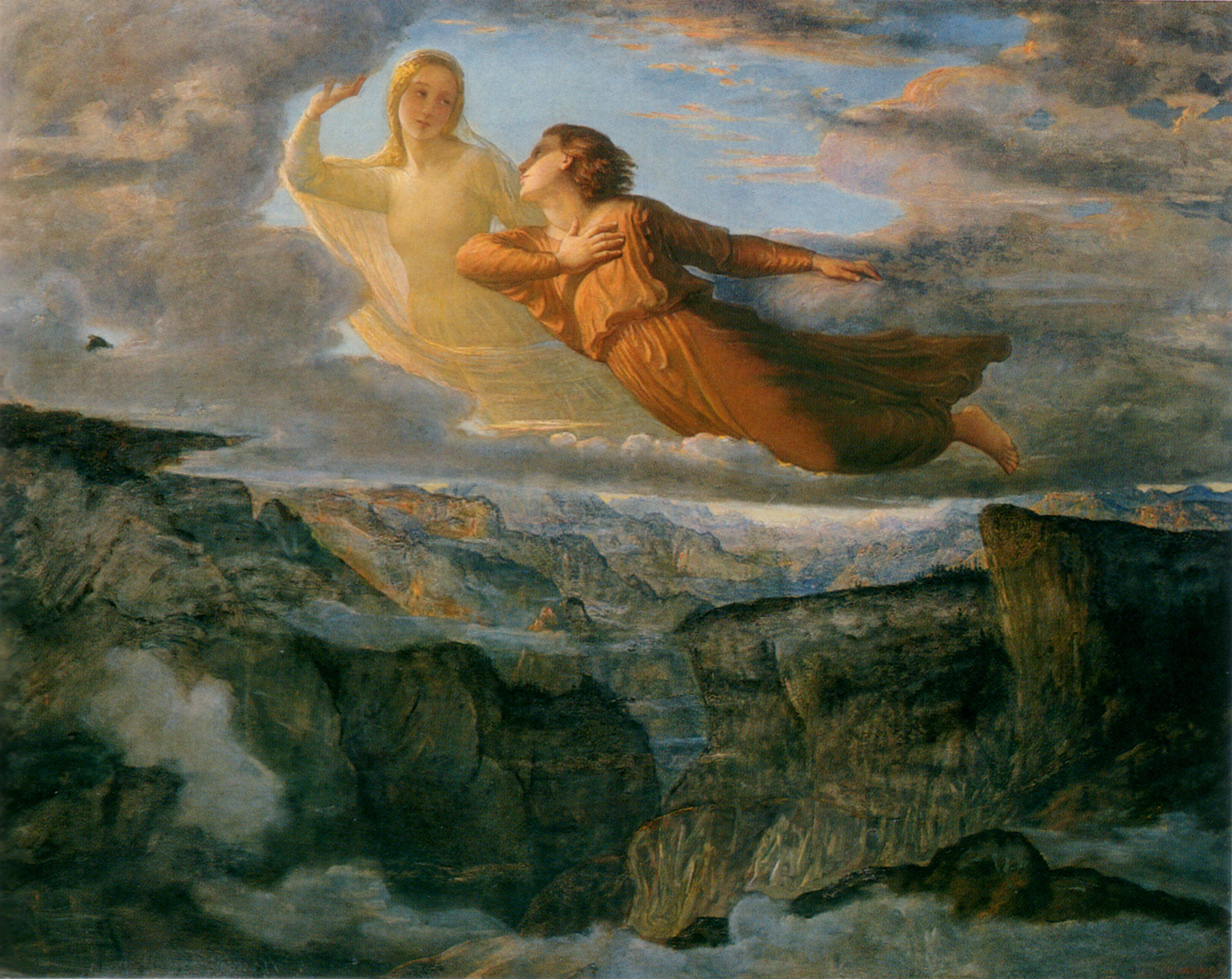
17. L’Idéal

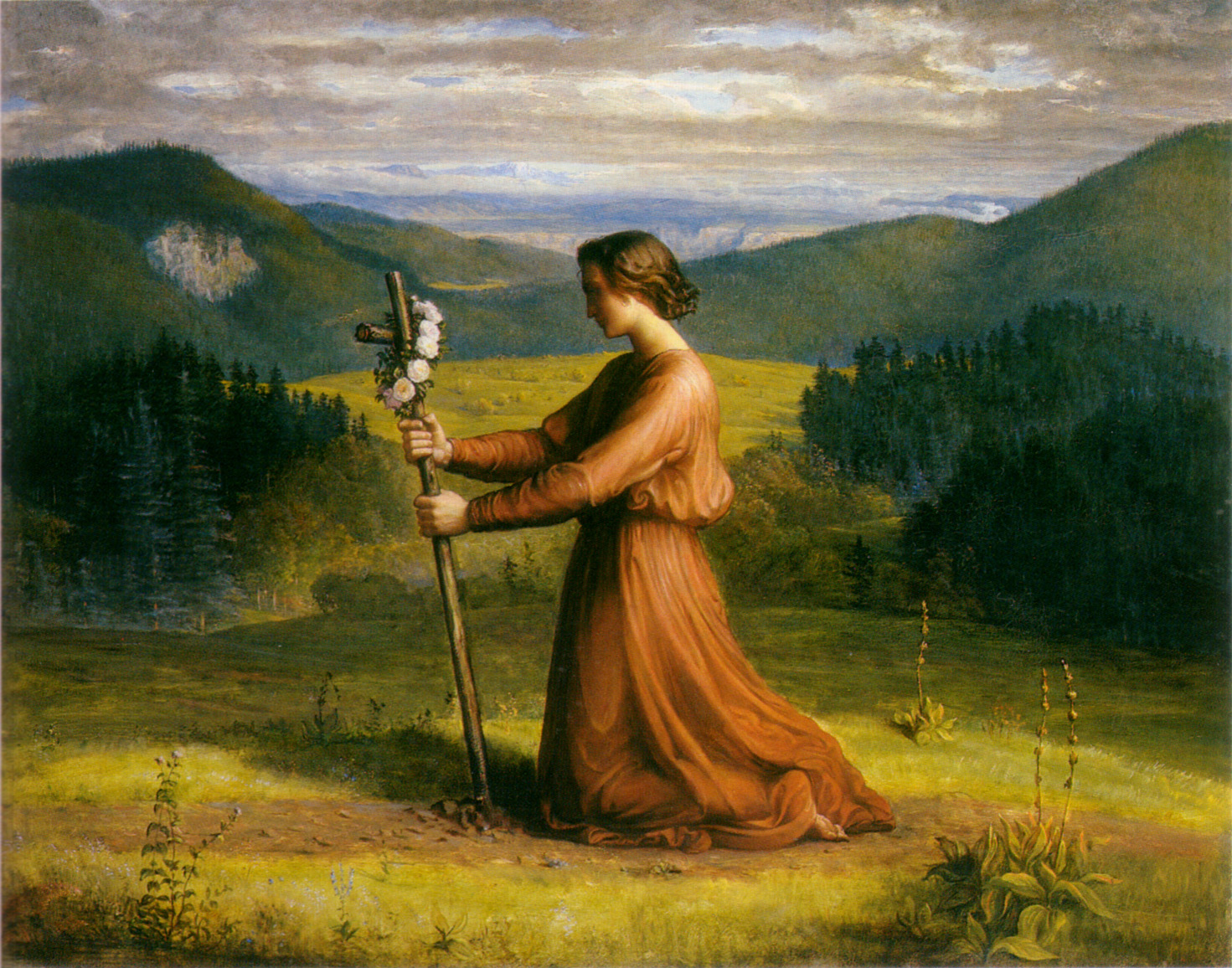
18. Réalité

=== Other works ===
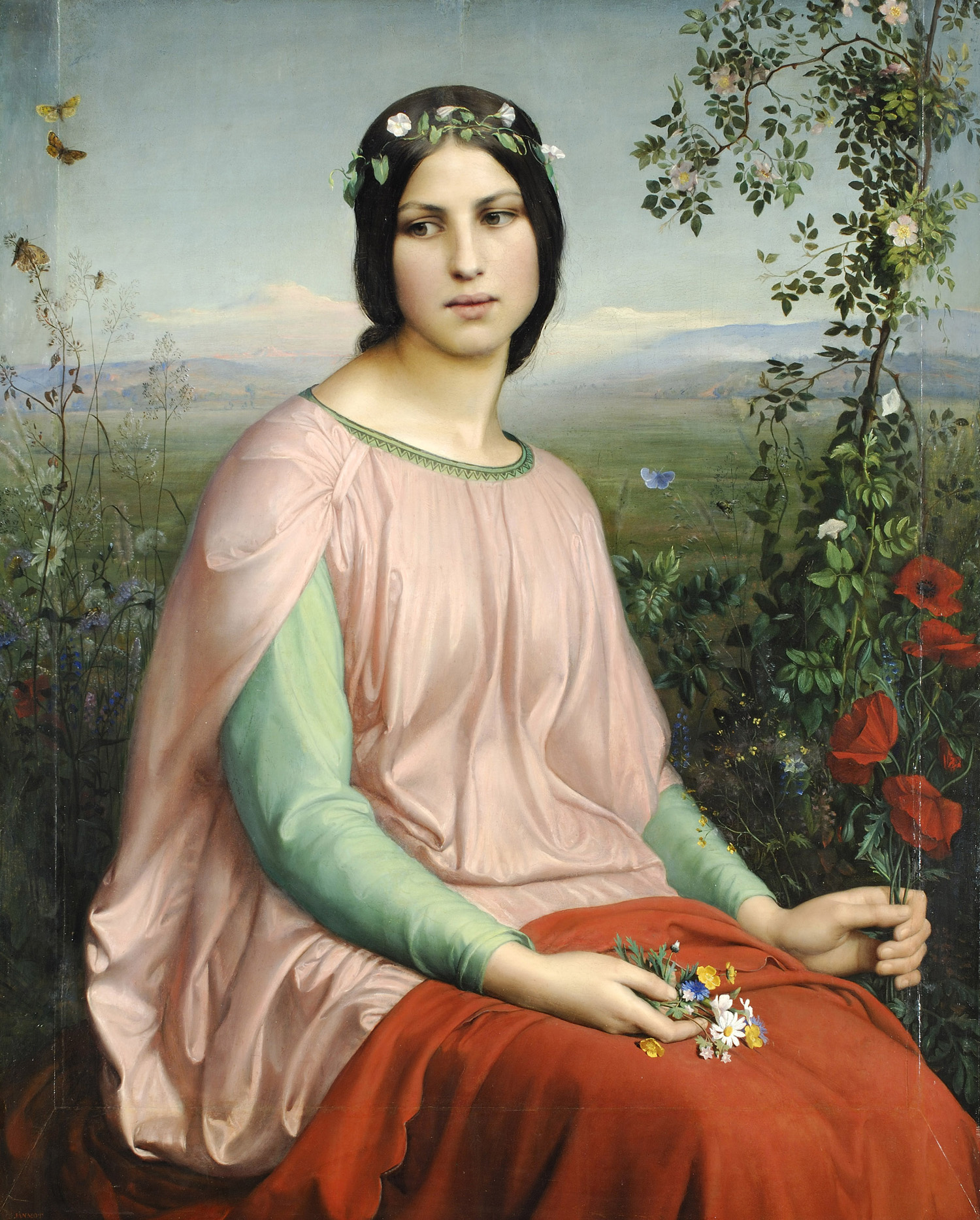
Flower of the Fields (1845)

- Self-portrait (1832), musée des beaux-arts de Lyon
- Le Christ au Jardin des Oliviers (1840), musée des beaux-arts de Lyon
- Flower of the Fields (1845), musée des beaux-arts de Lyon
- L'assomption de la vierge (1845), musée d'art moderne de Saint-Étienne
- Henri Lacordaire (1802-1861), musée national du château de Versailles et de Trianon
- The Torture of Mezentius (1865), musée d'Orsay

== Bibliography ==
- Élisabeth Hardouin-Fugier, Le Poème de l'âme par Louis Janmot, La Taillanderie, Châtillon-sur-Chalaronne, 2007, (ISBN 978-2-87629-358-8)
- Wolfgang Drost, Élisabeth Hardouin-Fugier, Louis Janmot, précurseur du symbolisme, C. Winter, Heidelberg 1994, (ISBN 3-8253-0209-1)
- Élisabeth Hardouin-Fugier, Louis Janmot, 1814–1892, Presses universitaires de Lyon, Lyon 1981, (ISBN 2-7297-0106-0)
- Louis Janmot, Opinion d’un artiste sur l’art, Vitte & Perrussel, Lyon 1887
- Jane Turner, From Monet to Cézanne: late 19th-century French artists? Grove Art, New York, St Martin's Press, (2000) (ISBN 0-312-22971-2)
- Sylvie Ramond, Gérard Bruyère et Léna Widerkher, Le Temps de la peinture, Lyon 1800-1914, Fage editions, Lyon (2007) 335 p. (ISBN 978-2-84975-101-5)
