= Lyon from the First to the Second Empire =

History of Lyon during the 19th-century Napoleonic and Imperial eras

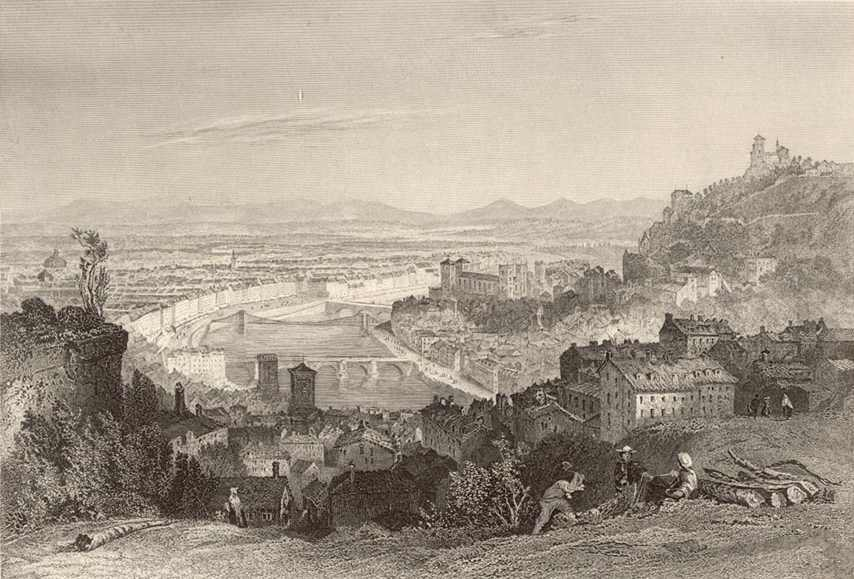
Lyon in 1869 viewed from the Croix-Rousse.

Lyon had undergone a period of considerable evolution. Experiencing an economic "golden age" driven by the silk industry, the city saw massive urban expansion and the beginnings of industrialization. Its population, often at the vanguard of republican and anticlerical movements, rose in revolt on several occasions.

== From a medieval city to an industrial city ==
During the first two-thirds of the 19th century, the city of Lyon was profoundly transformed. This was driven both by the elites, who created large bourgeois districts for themselves, and by the expansion of the silk and industrial sectors, which brought in a massive working-class population. During this period, Lyon expanded beyond its ancient walls, spreading toward Les Brotteaux, La Guillotière, and Vaise.

=== Demographic growth and immigration ===
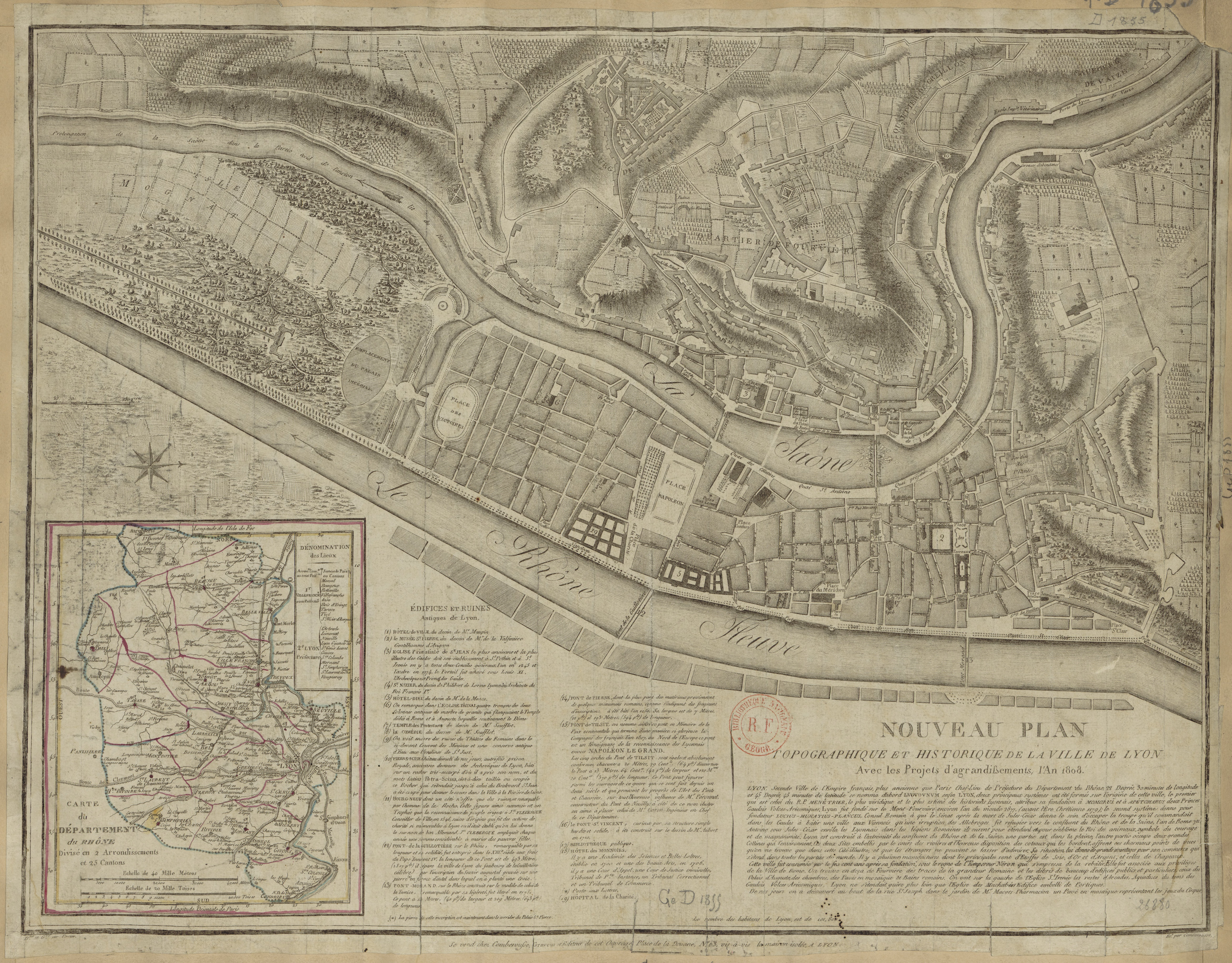
Topographical map of Lyon in 1808. Bibliothèque nationale de France.

Estimating the population of Lyon during this period remains difficult because census methods were inconsistent; certain categories—such as soldiers, seminarians, and hospital patients—were either counted "en bloc," estimated, or ignored entirely.

Overall, the population grew significantly during the 1800s, 1810s, and 1820s, stagnated during the 1830s, and rose sharply again thereafter. At the turn of the century, Lyon emerged diminished from the revolutionary turmoil, having lost 20,000 inhabitants. The population stood at 88,000 in 1800 and reached 94,000 in the census of 1804. Under the First Empire, demographic growth was strong, reaching 121,000 people by 1812. Subsequently, the population reached approximately 150,000 in 1827 and 178,000 in 1847.

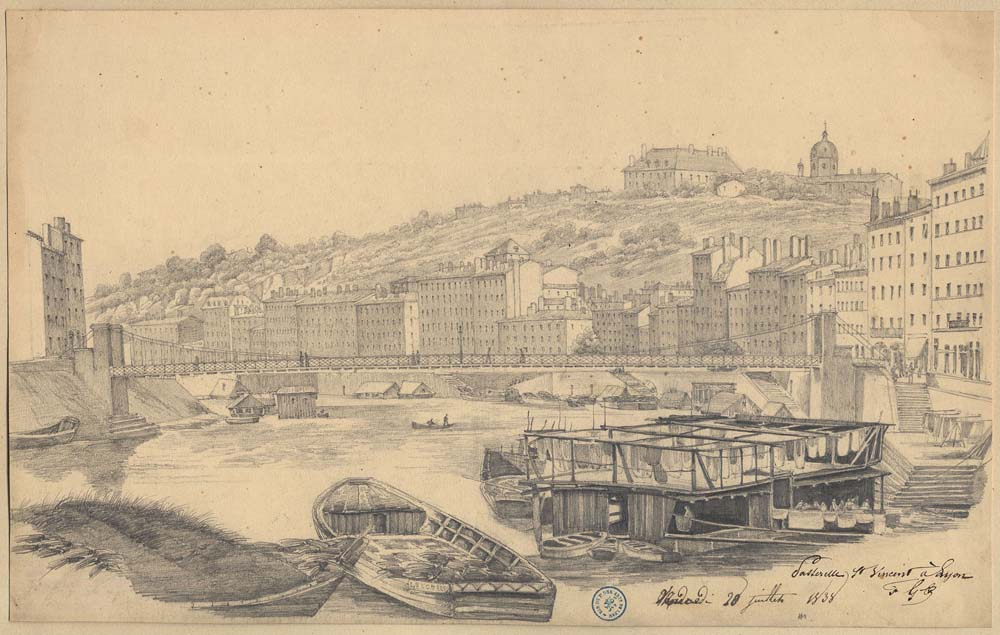
Drawing of the Saint-Vincent Footbridge and western Croix-Rousse in 1838 by François-Amédée Gabillot, showing the hill before urbanization.

Comparing the mid-century population of 178,000 to the pre-Revolution figure of 150,000 might suggest slow growth compared to national trends. However, while the commune of Lyon itself grew moderately, its suburbs experienced a massive influx. In fifty years, Vaise grew from 2,200 to 7,850 residents; La Croix-Rousse from 6,000 to 28,700; and La Guillotière from 6,000 to 41,500. Thus, the Lyon metropolitan area as a whole experienced growth comparable to other major European industrial cities.

In 1852, the city annexed the three communes of Vaise, La Croix-Rousse, and La Guillotière, bringing the total population to 234,531. Subsequent censuses recorded 255,960 in 1856; 297,251 in 1861; 300,761 in 1866; 301,307 in 1872; and 321,596 in 1876. During the Second Empire, population growth occurred mainly outside the city limits in communes that would become the 6th arrondissement of Lyon, Villeurbanne, Vénissieux, Vaulx-en-Velin, Bron, and Oullins. During the same period, central districts—particularly the Peninsula and Croix-Rousse—saw their populations decline.

The vast majority of this increase was due to immigration. In the 1820s, only 40% of the city's population were natives of Lyon. By the 1850s, less than 30% of the working-class population was born in the city. Most immigrants came from neighboring departments: Ain, Isère, Savoie, and Loire. Non-French residents accounted for only 12% of men and 3% of women.

=== Urban transformations ===
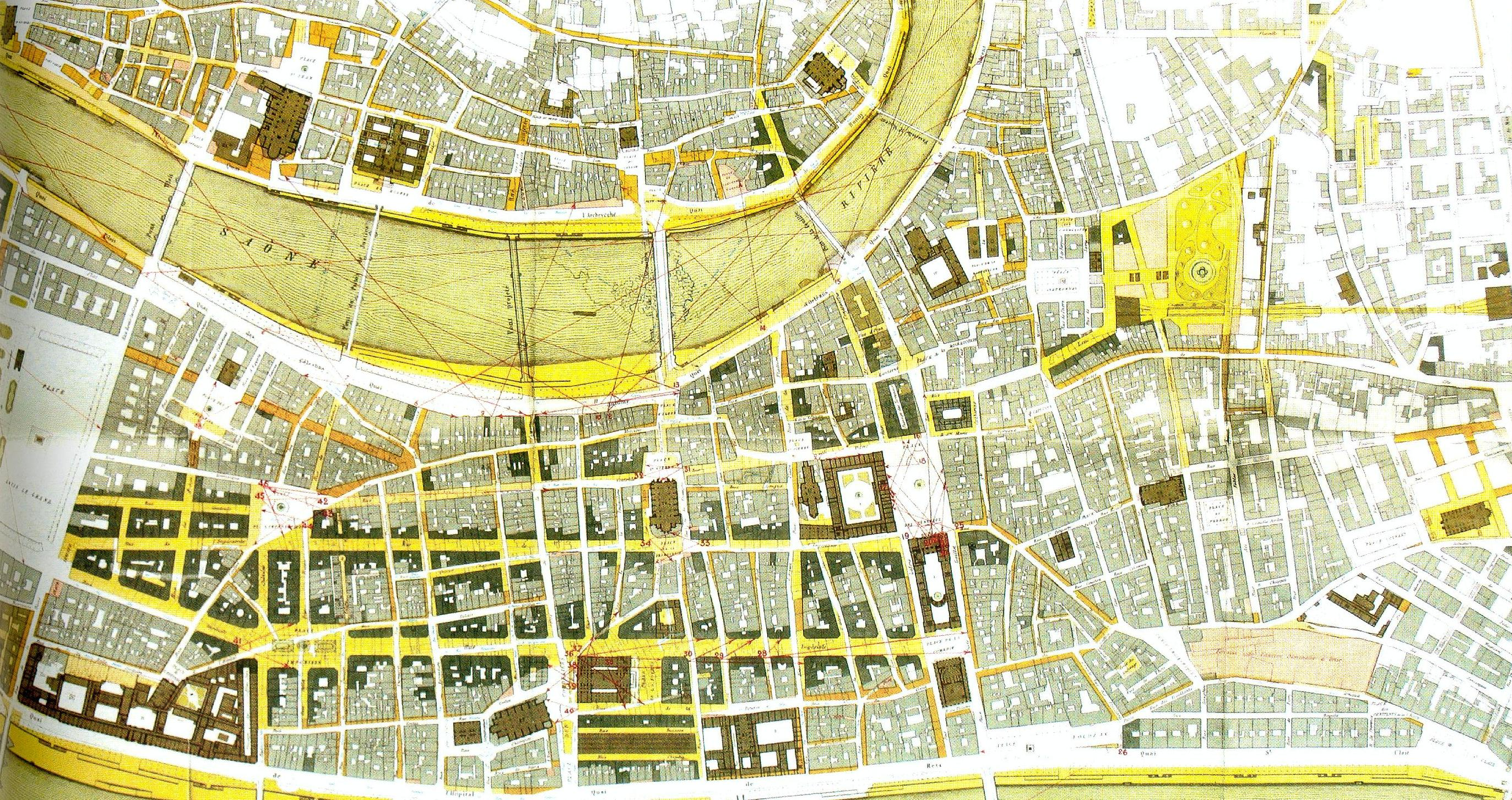
Plan of the roads opened or planned in central Lyon during the Second Empire.

==== General developments ====
Within the original city limits, large spaces were freed during the Revolution by the sale of church property. (Note: Most of these belonged to the Church of Ainay.) These areas were rapidly built upon from the start of the new century. Silk workers, needing to house new and very large looms, migrated from the Saint-Jean and Saint-Paul districts to new buildings specifically designed for this activity in the 1830s and 1840s, notably on the Croix-Rousse hill.

It was under the Second Empire that most major urban renovations took place. The Prefect of the Rhône and Mayor of Lyon, Claude-Marius Vaïsse, (Note: The primary architects of these transformations were City Chief Architect T. Desjardins and Roadway Chief Engineer G. Bonnet.) undertook extensive transformations, similar to Haussmann in Paris, for reasons of both prestige and security. He relied on the chief engineer of roadways, Gustave Bonnet, and the architect Benoît Poncet, who completed the Rue Impériale (now Rue de la République) in the 1850s.

The Peninsula was pierced by two wide avenues (Rue Impériale and Rue de l'Impératrice, now Rue du Président-Édouard-Herriot), bridges were renovated (with tolls removed), and quays were raised to protect new districts from the flooding of the Rhône and Saône. The Parc de la Tête d'Or was created, and railway stations were established in Perrache, Brotteaux, La Guillotière, and Vaise. The left bank of the Rhône developed considerably, with buildings lining major avenues and many bourgeois houses set in green spaces. This part of Lyon experienced two major surges of urbanization in 1853 and 1862.

Finally, a fortification belt was begun in 1830 and built throughout the 19th century, intended to defend the city against foreign attacks.

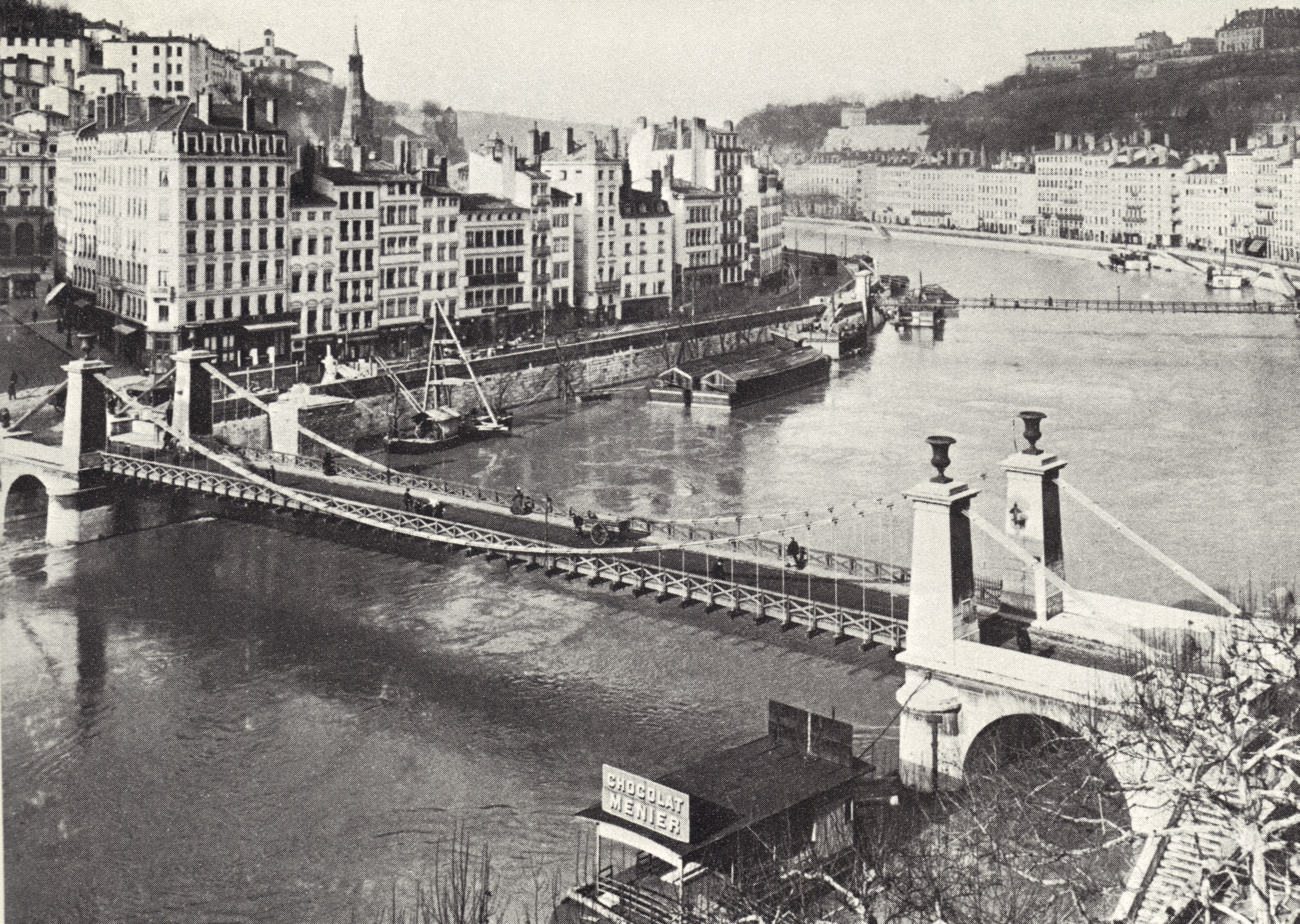
Pont la Feuillée, built in 1831 to link Saint-Paul to the Peninsula (1900 photo).

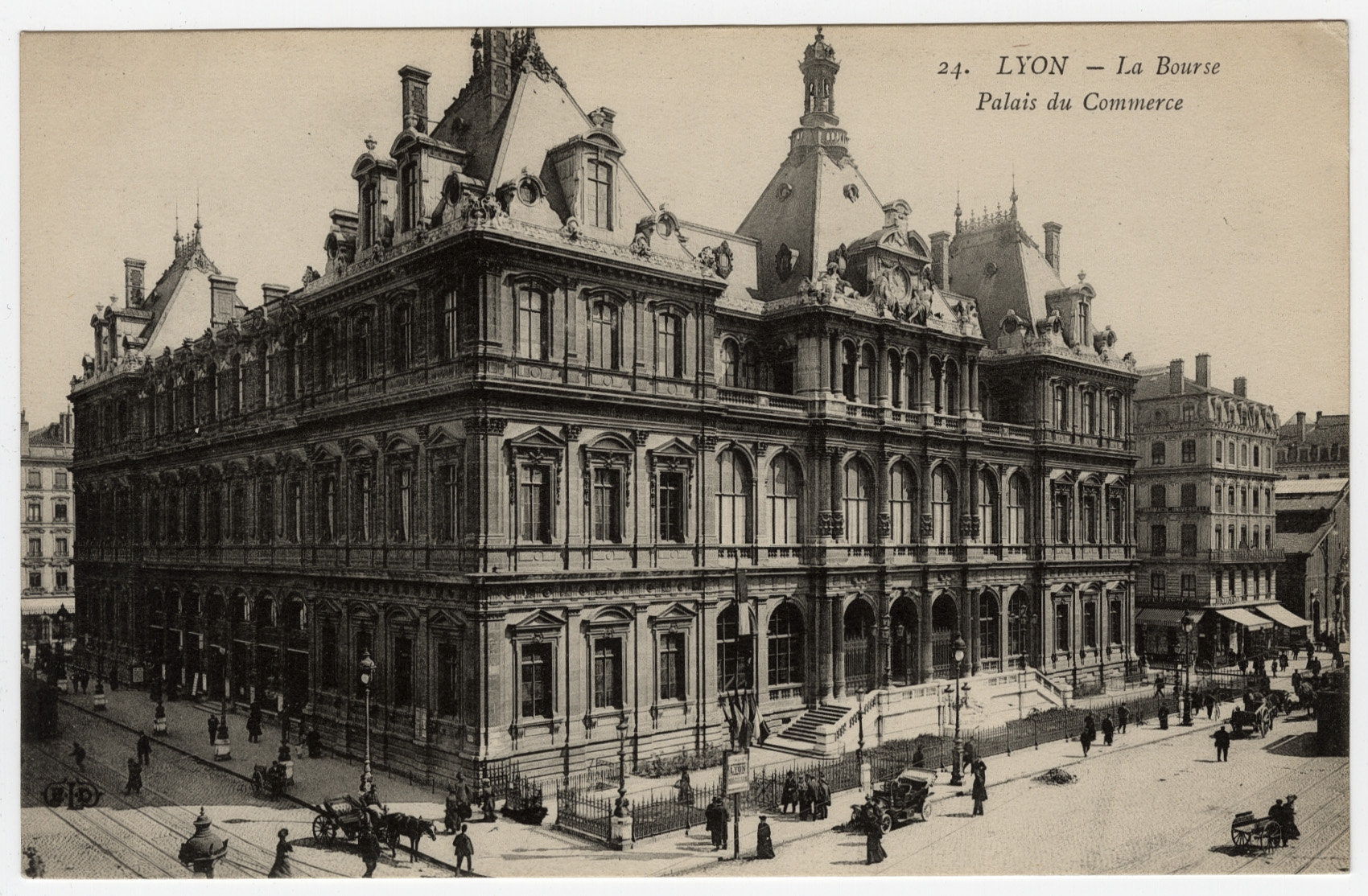
Palais de la Bourse.

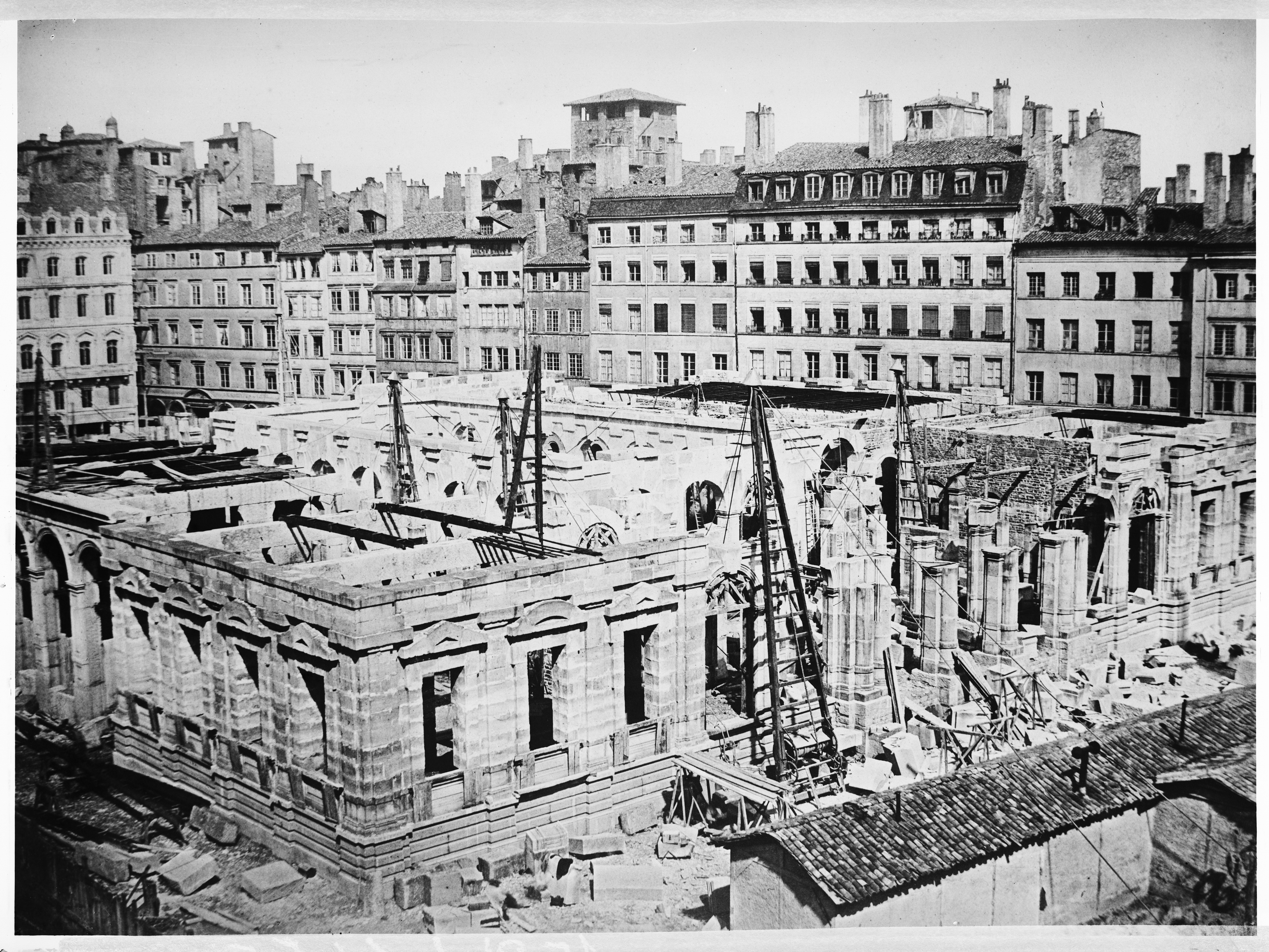
Construction of the Palais de la Bourse and opening of Rue Impériale.

===== Communication routes =====
Mayor Fay de Sathonay inaugurated the Tilsitt Bridge in 1808 and completed the naming and numbering of the city's streets in 1810.

===== Street lighting =====
At the beginning of the 19th century, Lyon's streets were lit by lanterns managed by a company led by M. Fréquent. Until 1826, the streets were lit only from September 15 to April 1; thereafter, they were lit year-round. In 1827, the municipality invested in streetlights using Argand lamps (quinquets), which provided better illumination.

In 1827, a first trial of gas lighting was established in Rue Tupin-Rompu and the Passage de l'Argue. In 1834, the Compagnie d'éclairage par le gaz pour la ville de Lyon was created. Its factory was located in the new Perrache district and became known as the Compagnie de gaz Perrache. It signed a convention with the municipality in 1835 to light the entire city. In 1856, Prefect Vaïsse signed a new 47-year convention, establishing a monopoly for the company, which allowed it to charge high rates to residents.

==== Neighborhood developments ====
Developments across Lyon's neighborhoods were uneven; while central zones received significant attention from authorities, other areas experienced varied transformations.

===== Fourvière =====
The first cemetery outside the city limits was opened at Loyasse in 1808.

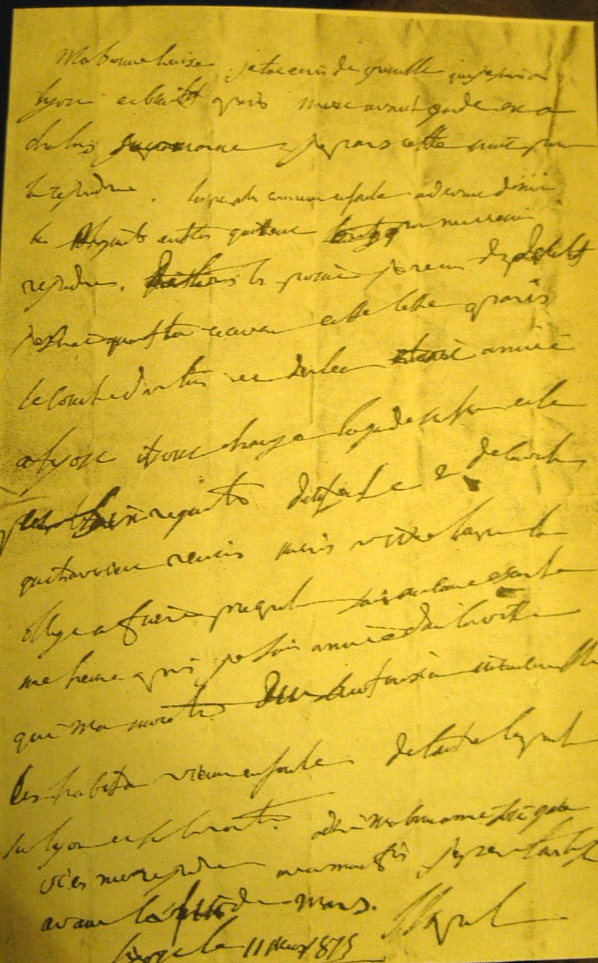
Letter from Napoleon to Marie-Louise of Austria, testifying to the enthusiasm of the Lyonnais during his return during the Hundred Days.

== A political life under surveillance ==
From 1800 to 1870, political life in Lyon was tightly controlled and expressed only within restricted frameworks. The State feared outbreaks of Lyonnais violence and maintained its institutions through the prefect, a compliant municipality, and a vigilant police force. The two main political trends at the beginning of the period were counter-revolution and moderate liberalism. It was not until the reign of Napoleon III that the far-left managed to exist politically.

=== First Empire ===
The seizure of power by Bonaparte was perceived favorably as the end of a dark period and a return to civil peace. Upon stopping in Lyon on June 28, 1800, following the victory at Marengo, Bonaparte laid the first stone for the renovation of the facades of Place Bellecour, promising to work toward the return of the city's prosperity. Regarding civil peace, he undertook energetic measures to combat both banditry and the threat of rebellion.

==== The pacification of Lyon ====
At the end of the revolutionary period, banditry was endemic in the Lyon region. Attacks on mail coaches or isolated individuals were frequent. This task was the priority of the generals who successively headed the 19th military region: Moncey, Gilly, and Duhesme. The situation gradually improved, and by the mid-1800s, the department's roads were much safer. This recurring military presence also facilitated the calming of the city itself.

===== The police commissioners =====
At the same time, an informant network was established by the first two commissioners general of police in Lyon: Noël (1800–1801) and Louis François Esprit Dubois (1801–1809). This well-remunerated network—consuming up to 20% of their budget—extended far beyond the city, maintaining permanent links with all major surrounding towns. They also benefited from the increasingly complete and reliable police files organized by Fouché, allowing them to better identify travelers. Gradually, in the eyes of the central authorities, Lyon lost some of its sulfurous reputation as it became better known.

The commissioners general were appointed directly by the Emperor and received comfortable salaries in large cities like Lyon. Installed in the city hall, the commissioner had a general secretary, a private secretary, and several offices employing about twenty people in departments for passports, military affairs, and minor road inspections. Commissioner Dubois modernized the Lyon police, relying on Ancien Régime practices while introducing innovations. Paid by the city but independent of the prefect, Dubois came into conflict over his remuneration with the mayor appointed in 1805, Nicolas Fay. He left Lyon in 1809 to become the director general of police in Tuscany, which had just been annexed.

===== Assessment =====
The return of prosperity facilitated the support of a large part of the population for the new regime, though the central power maintained close surveillance of Republican and Royalist circles. This support was visible in the acceptance of military conscription and the raising of the National Guard, where resistance was much lower than in the countryside.

==== Political life ====
Under the Empire, all city authorities depended on the central power and were under the supervision of the prefect. In 1800, the city was divided into three districts with three appointed mayors: Parent, Saint-Rousset, and Bernard-Charpieu. Reunified in 1805, it was then led by Fay de Sathonay, followed by André d'Albon. The archbishop, the Emperor's uncle, was Joseph Fesch. The press, like all clubs and societies of notables, was monitored. The only early form of protest came from Catholics, who used the secrecy of congregations to pass information and pamphlets, reactivating the counter-revolutionary networks established by Linsolas. These were uncovered in 1811.

===== Implementation of new institutions (1800) =====
The new Constitution of the Year VIII, approved by plebiscite at the end of 1799 following the November coup, established the Consulate. This regime implemented a political system of restricted suffrage and central appointments for major posts. While a full prosopographical study of the notables who took administrative functions has not been conducted, the most important figure in the city and department was the prefect, who replaced the old departmental administration at the city hall.

===== Municipality of Fay de Sathonay (1805–1812) =====
Fay de Sathonay hailed from the Lyonnais bourgeoisie and quickly sought to make the city hall the center of local political power, leading to occasional tensions with the prefect or the police commissioner. He attempted to revive the Ancien Régime practice of glorifying the sovereign to extract local advantages, particularly financial ones, by celebrating every victory or major event of the reign. Sathonay launched a project for an imperial palace in the Perrache district and a statue of the Emperor on Place Bellecour. Neither gained the favor of the authorities, and the financial flexibility he hoped for did not materialize. In 1812, the municipality lost control of the octrois (local tolls), which were transferred to a state agency. Furthermore, municipal finances were permanently controlled by the prefect to prevent unnecessary deficits.

Sathonay did succeed in carrying out several large-scale works. He purchased new buildings for the Antiquaille Hospital, completed the Tilsitt Bridge (now Pont Bonaparte) over the Saône to relieve the Pont du Change, and opened the Loyasse Cemetery, the city's first external cemetery. In 1810, he finalized the naming and numbering of the streets.

He also allocated funds to enrich cultural institutions, making acquisitions for the Municipal Library of Lyon and the Museum of Fine Arts of Lyon, including floral paintings by Jan van Dael and Jan van Huysum. The municipality also financially supported Lyon's two theaters to maintain programming equal to other major European cities. However, several of his proposals, such as a medical university or a law faculty, were rejected by the central power.

===== Actions of the Prefecture =====
The priorities for the prefects—the masters of the department—were monitoring the population, ensuring local administrations functioned correctly, and reviving trade as a source of wealth and social peace. The post was of great military importance as Lyon controlled the road to the south and the Alpine passes; it was held by eight different people during the Consulate and Empire.

The prefectural administration was directly appointed by the central power, composed of four councilors. Notable early councilors included physician Claude Dechavane, lawyer Nicolas-François Cochard, Plouvyé, and Antoine Defarge. These men provided stability as prefects frequently changed. The council was led by a secretary general, the first being Urbain Jaume.

The first prefect, Raymond de Verninac-Saint-Maur, rebuilt Lyon's local administrations. He appointed mayors, restored the National Guard (abolished since 1793), and re-established the octrois for city revenue. Seeking cultural prestige, he revived the Academy of Lyon under the name "Athenaeum." Verninac welcomed Napoleon on June 29, 1800, after his second Italian campaign, an event that symbolically marked the city's rehabilitation in the eyes of the state.

===== Lyon and the Emperor =====
January 26, 1802: The Consulta of the Cisalpine Republic meeting in Lyon at the Trinité College. Palace of Versailles.

Napoleon also chose Lyon to host the Consulta of Lyon in 1802. Beyond the prestige, Lyonnais merchants used the occasion to reconnect with Italian colleagues and build fruitful commercial ties. Napoleon's popularity was evident during his 1805 visit to be crowned King of Italy, as crowds gathered to cheer him.

The mass of the population remained favorable to the Emperor even after his fall, as shown by the enthusiastic welcome during the Hundred Days. This attachment was also linked to the fact that during the 1814 campaign, following the Battle of Limonest, General Augereau avoided a siege, sparing the city from bombardment and looting.

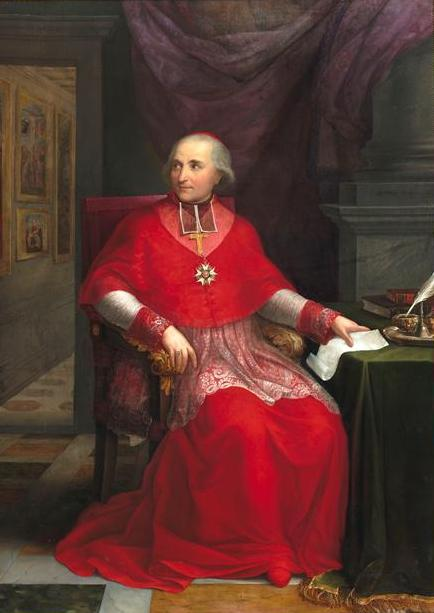
Cardinal Fesch, Palace of Fontainebleau.

==== Religious life - pacification and normalization ====
Authorities moved quickly to restore religious peace, which had been undermined by a powerful refractory church led by Abbé Jacques Linsolas. Following the Concordat of 1801, Napoleon purged the most uncompromising figures from both the Catholic and anti-religious sides.

In Lyon, Linsolas became an obstacle by refusing contact with the former Constitutional clergy. Napoleon ordered his arrest, which Commissioner Dubois achieved on September 15, 1801. Linsolas was exiled to Turin. Peace was only achieved after the First Consul's direct intervention and threats. Napoleon appointed his uncle, Joseph Fesch, as archbishop. A conscientious pastor, Fesch made Lyon a center of Catholic renewal and established good relations with Protestants and the Jewish community.

A major religious event was the visit of Pope Pius VII in 1805 for the imperial coronation. He presided over the reopening of the Fourvière sanctuary, where large crowds sought his blessing.

===== The "Petite Église" of Lyon =====
Despite the official reconciliation, an intransigent fraction rejected the Concordat, refusing any liturgical changes. Mocked as the "Petite Église" (Little Church), they remained a minority but persisted throughout the 19th century. Under the Empire, they were linked to Bourbon loyalists; some, like Claude Desfours de la Genetière, were pursued by the imperial police. Furthermore, a generation of young Catholics organized within secret groups known as "The Congregation" made Lyon a hub for religious opposition to the Empire.

==== Municipal social actions ====
Since the Revolution, municipalities had been responsible for aiding the indigent. In Lyon, welfare offices (bureaux de bienfaisance) distributed food stamps and medical assistance provided by volunteer doctors. Municipal powers relied heavily on donations and legacies, as dedicated taxes (on theater tickets and cemetery concessions) were insufficient.

Social action was largely carried out through the Hospices Civils de Lyon, which included the Hôtel-Dieu (caring for sick children), the Charité (housing the elderly, orphans, and pregnant women), and the Antiquaille Hospital (for the incurable and insane). Despite theoretical public control, private interests dominated the Hospices because municipal subsidies were inadequate. Administration remained a path for old elites to reach high municipal functions.

==== The end of the Empire and the Hundred Days ====
===== The collapse of the Empire =====
By late 1813, military disasters like the Battle of Leipzig forced Napoleon to retreat to France. In the Lyon region, the Austrian army took Geneva, exposing Lyon to attack. On January 12, 1814, Austrian scouts appeared under the walls of Lyon, which were poorly defended.

Marshal Augereau, charged with the city's defense, faced resistance from city authorities who feared reprisals and refused to mobilize the population. He eventually gathered 20,000 men to face 40,000 Austrians under the Prince of Hesse-Homburg. After a decisive defeat at the Battle of Limonest on March 20, Augereau retreated to Valence to spare Lyon a siege. Municipal authorities surrendered the keys to the Austrians the following day. When Napoleon passed through the city toward exile on the Isle of Elba, Lyon remained silent.

===== First Restoration =====
The First Restoration began in Lyon with a population divided between monarchists, Bonapartists, and republicans. To lead the city, the Count of Artois appointed Count Alexis de Noailles. Noailles negotiated the departure of Austrian troops and rallied local elites to the Crown. He limited administrative purges and sidelined radical monarchists. When he left Lyon in July 1814, the city was peaceful.

== Lyonnais society ==
=== Charitable works ===
Faced with rapid demographic growth and industrial shifts, Lyon's high society reactivated or created religious and secular structures to provide assistance to the city's impoverished population. Debates frequently occupied wealthy circles regarding the best means and methods to aid the destitute.

=== Mutual aid societies ===
A number of districts remained largely outside the network of charitable works, particularly those on the periphery such as Vaise, La Croix-Rousse, and La Guillotière. These areas were feared by the bourgeoisie, who rarely ventured into these new neighborhoods populated by recent arrivals seeking work, who were often viewed as foreigners. Over time, to fill this void, social systems of self-help were established in the form of mutual aid societies (sociétés de secours mutuels).

== An economy dominated by silk ==
Between 1800 and 1870, Lyon regained a prominent position in the national economy. This was largely achieved through its traditional silk industry, which "represented the leading item of French exports." Nevertheless, other industries gradually emerged alongside it, supported by a very active banking sector.

=== The Napoleonic period and economic reconstruction ===
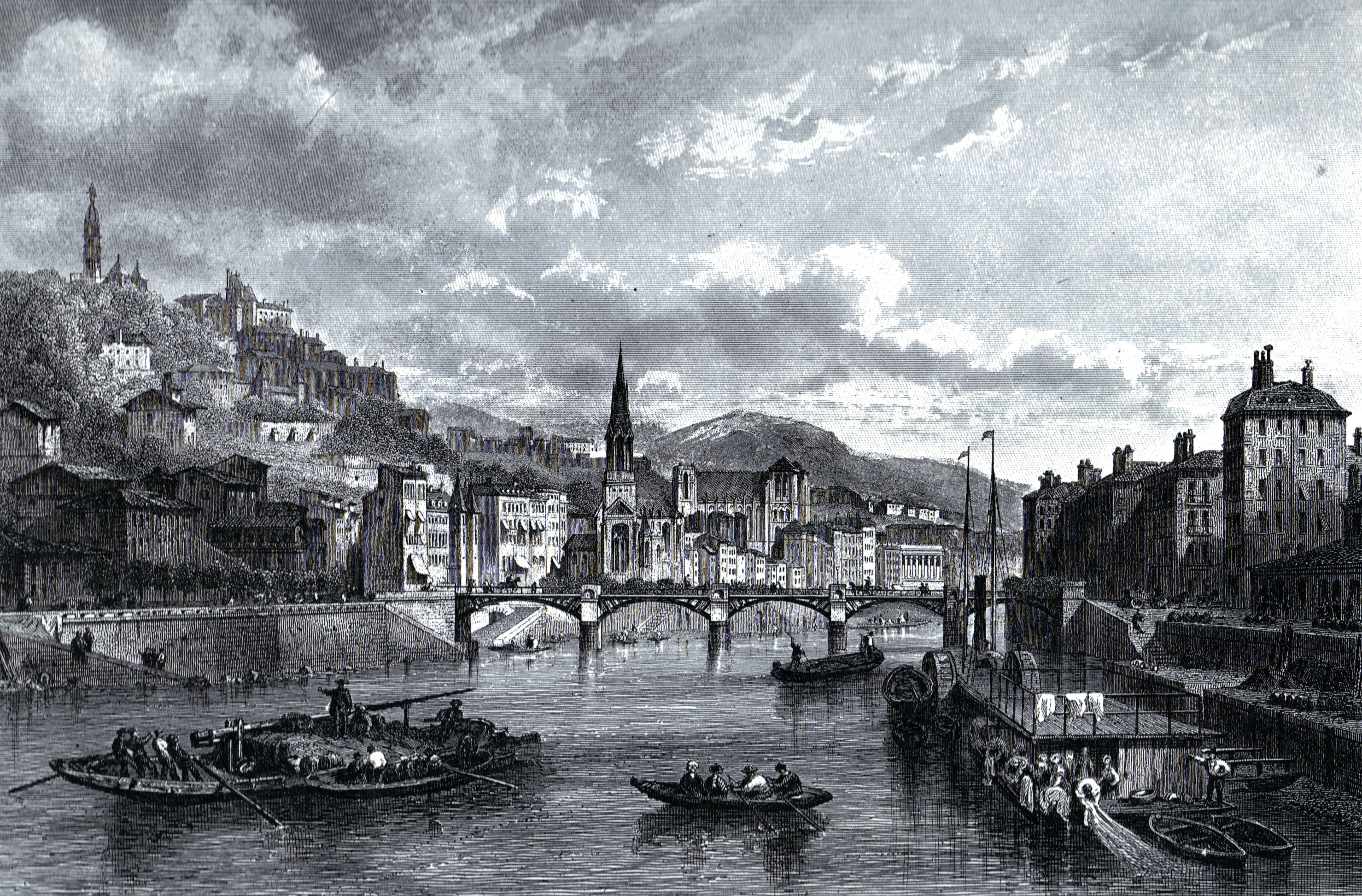
Boatmen on the Saône, 1860 engraving showing the view of Fourvière and Saint-Georges.

Emerging from the Revolution, Lyon was a devastated and ruined city. Much of the economic elite, especially foreigners, had fled. A third of the population had deserted a city without work, with numbers falling from approximately 150,000 to 100,000 between 1788 and 1800. Market opportunities were severely reduced. The First French Empire worked to relaunch the economy; during his stop in Lyon on June 28, 1800, Bonaparte promised to restore the city and took numerous measures to do so throughout his reign. Prestige orders from the state strongly revived activity. These largely went to Claude-Camille Pernon, who enjoyed the Emperor's favor and benefited from the development of the Jacquard machine in his workshops, which accelerated production.

To compensate for the lack of capital caused by the disappearance of the four annual fairs, a branch of the Bank of France was established in 1808, though it was poorly received by bankers wary of fiat money and the regime's stability. The "worker's book" (livret ouvrier), ill-suited to the world of the Fabrique (the silk collective), was repurposed to document relations between weavers and merchants. Conversely, the Condition des soies (Silk Condition House), created in 1805 to unambiguously measure the humidity and quality of the silk, was adopted immediately. A purely Lyonnais creation also proved its utility: the industrial tribunal (conseil de prud'hommes). Created in 1806, it originally functioned for conciliation and arbitration, smoothing relations between social groups with firmly antagonistic positions.

Overall, the city's economic record during the Napoleonic period was positive; the workforce returned, and the activity of major merchants resumed vigorously.

=== The golden age of Lyonnais silk ===
The 19th century was the apogee of Lyonnais silk. Production, diversity, and commercial expansion reached unprecedented levels. Following the Napoleonic relaunch, the city lived entirely by its weaving and trade, which drove other industrial and banking sectors. Silk brought world renown to the city, notably through participation in the Universal Exhibitions.

==== Renaissance under Napoleon ====
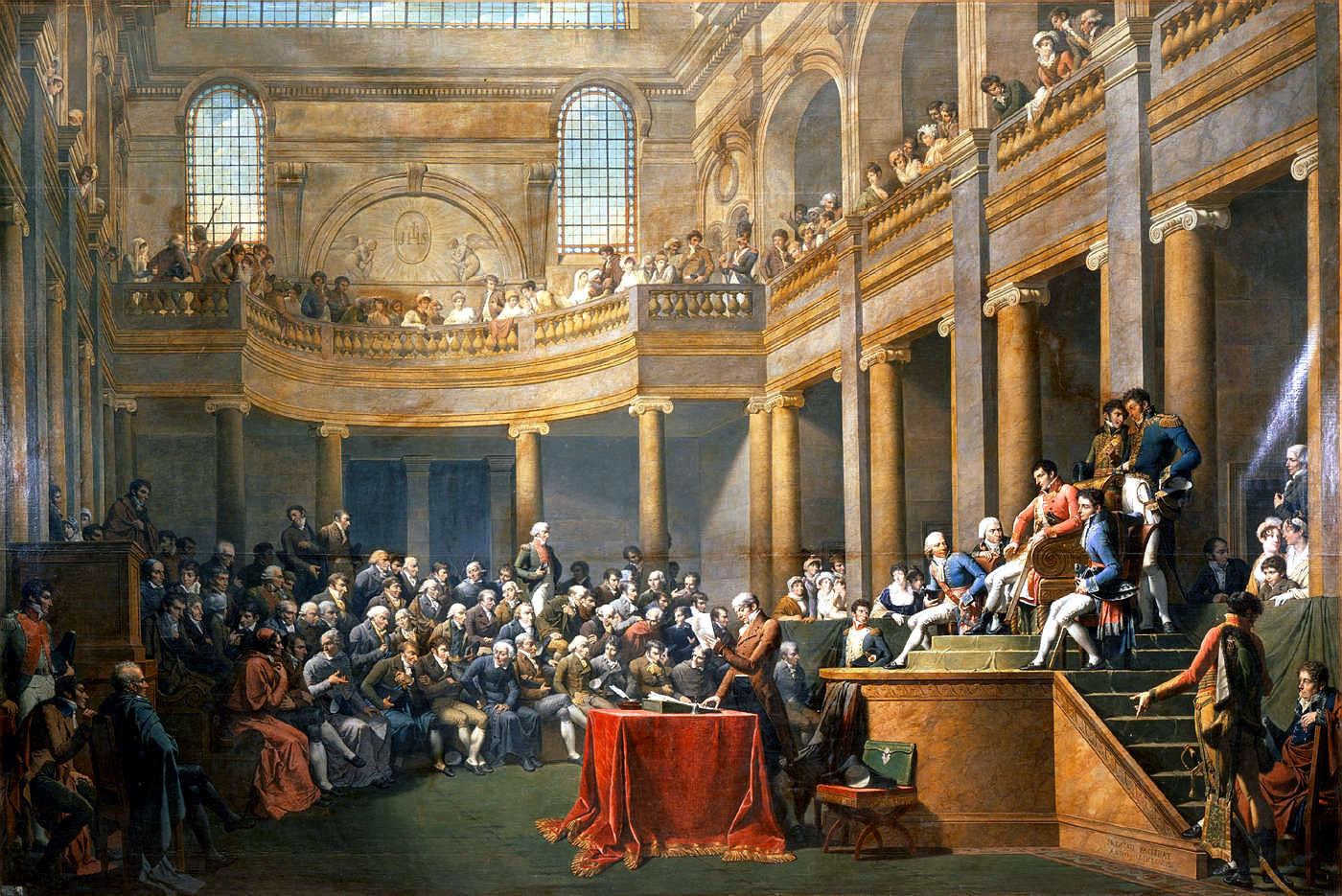
Painting by Nicolas-André Monsiau depicting the Consulta of Lyon of the Cisalpine Republic held in January 1802.

Under the Napoleonic Empire, the Fabrique slowly rebuilt its production capacity, welcoming foreign investors and fostering a more modern and efficient work environment. To mitigate the labor shortage and accelerate production, a decisive breakthrough was made with the perfection of the Jacquard mechanism.

===== Imperial commissions and industry restoration =====
At the start of the 19th century, the silk industry rose from its ashes under the impetus of Napoleon I. Aware of silk's economic potential, he investigated the state of the Rhone economy, notably during his three-week stay for the Consulta of Lyon in January 1802. He placed massive orders for the Imperial palaces. The first was granted solely to the merchant-manufacturer Pernon in 1802 for the Château de Saint-Cloud, followed by a second in 1807 for the throne room at the Palace of Versailles. Between 1808 and 1810, several manufacturers (Lacostat & Trollier, Bissardon, Cousin & Bony, and Grand-frères) produced pieces for various rooms at Versailles and the Château de Meudon.

The most significant order arrived in 1811, totaling an exceptional 2,000,000 francs for over 80,000 meters of fabric. It was closely monitored by the administrator of crown furniture, Alexandre Desmazis, who spent a month in Lyon supervising its execution. The order was divided among a dozen Lyonnais silk houses including Lacostat, Bissardon, Cousin & Bony, Grand-frères, Chuard, Dutillieu & Theoleyre, Corderier, Seguin, and Gros.

Despite official purchases, production growth remained slow during the Empire, limited to about 1.7% per year. However, it allowed the industry to regain and surpass 1789 levels. While silk fabric production in 1801 was 35% lower than on the eve of the Revolution, it recovered to that level by 1810.

===== A supportive environment =====
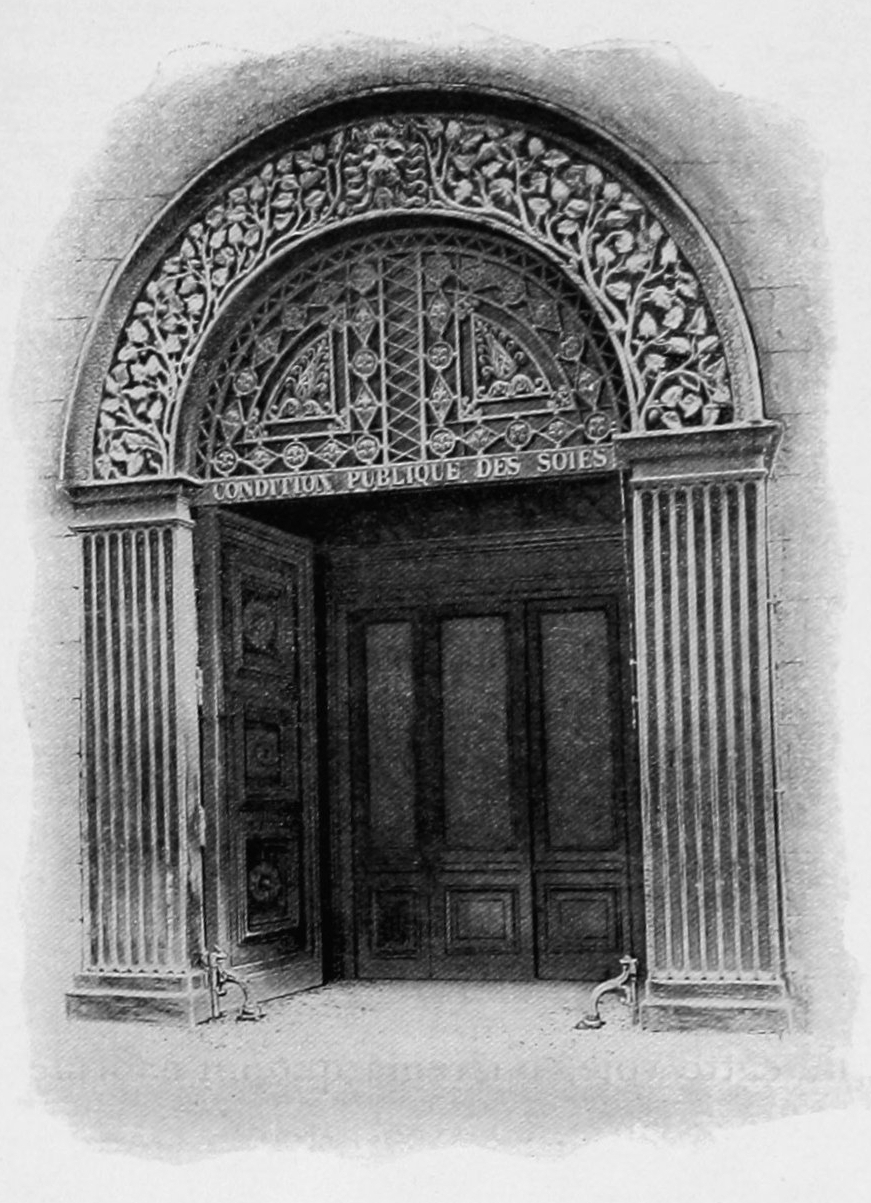
Entrance to the Condition des soies, one of the instruments for developing the Lyonnais textile industry in the 19th century.

Since the destruction of the guild regulations during the Revolution had led to profound disorganization, the Imperial power—strongly urged by Lyonnais silk workers—undertook several reforms to re-establish professional organization. This included the restoration of the Chamber of Commerce (1802), the creation of the Condition des soies (1805), and the establishment of the very first labor court (conseil de prud'hommes), then solely dedicated to Lyon silk. The silk workers formed the Société des amis du commerce et des arts, which supported the establishment of a provident fund for weavers, regulated tariffs, and professional training to ensure workforce quality. To support artistic skills, an Imperial School of Fine Arts was founded at the Palais Saint-Pierre, alongside a museum in 1807. Finally, the worker's book was adapted to the specific needs of the Fabrique, introducing more flexibility into hierarchical relations. With growth, social peace returned.

In the sector of chemistry, dyeing made significant progress in Lyon. Following the discovery of defects in the initial Pernon order, Lyonnais scientists researched more stable, beautiful, and cheaper dyes. Napoleon ordered the creation of a chemistry school in Lyon. Its first director, Jean-Michel Raymond, discovered a process to produce Prussian blue using a form of cyanide, which was far less expensive than traditional methods.

This era also saw the first "Exhibitions of National Industrial Products." Camille Pernon was the first to exhibit in 1802. Subsequently, silk workers became increasingly numerous, and exhibition catalogs allow one to track the evolution of techniques and styles.

Because the silk sector struggled to find local investors capable of relaunching production, many foreign firms were welcomed. Numerous branches opened in the city, ordering simple fabrics for export to Europe and beyond. These firms brought significant capital to Lyon, including Swiss firms from Geneva (Diodati, Odier & Juventin, Dassier), German firms from Leipzig (Feronce & Crayen) and Frankfurt (H. Reiss), and Italian firms from Milan (Soresi) and Turin (Travi).

The Lyonnais Fabrique also benefited at this time from the Continental System, which limited competition from English fabrics.

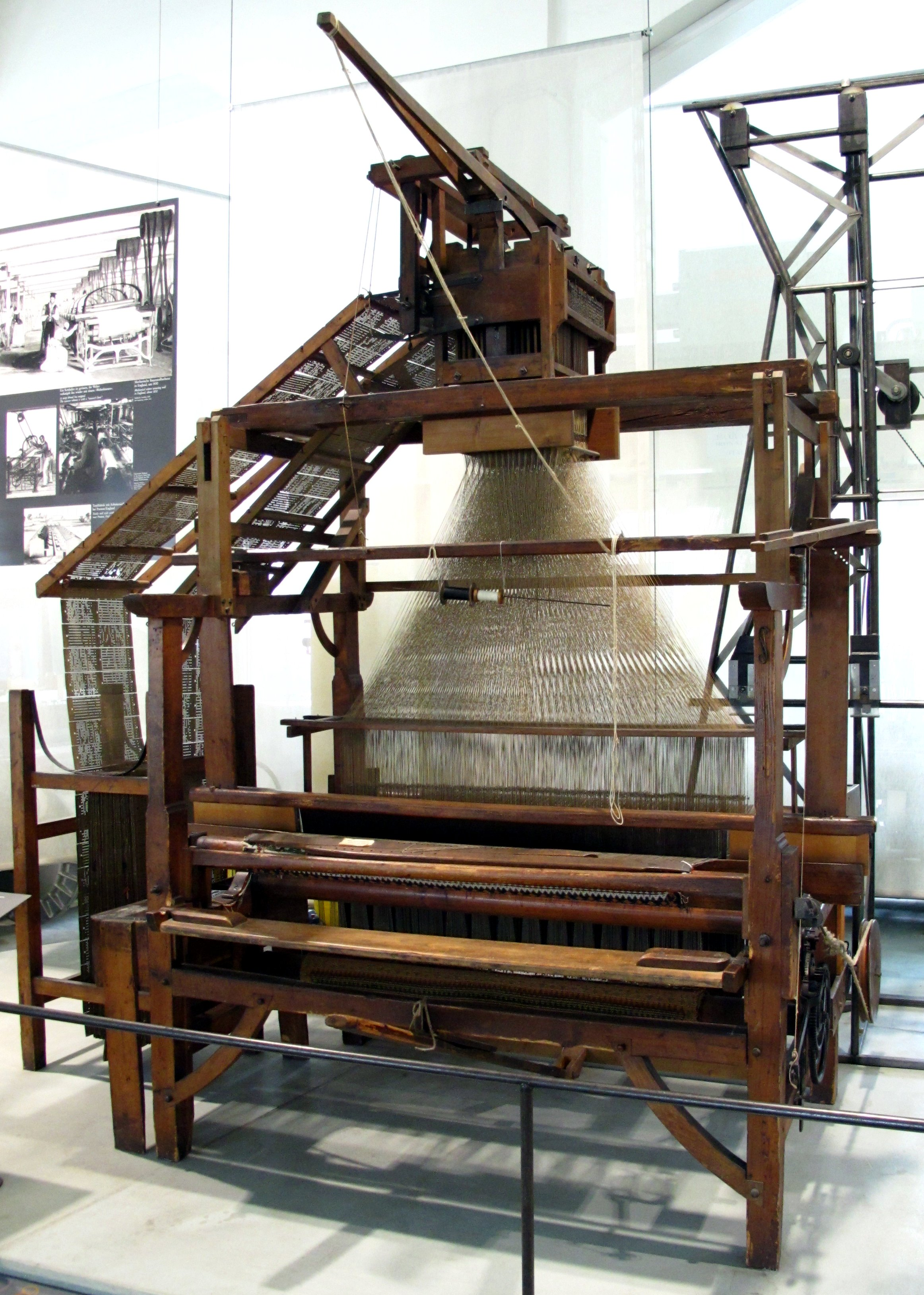
A Jacquard loom from circa 1860, preserved at the Deutsches Museum.

===== Mechanization: The Jacquard Loom and its consequences =====
In response to a prize offered in 1801 for improving looms, Joseph Marie Jacquard proposed a mechanism allowing a single worker to produce complex fabrics. He drew on the earlier research of Basile Bouchon, Jean-Baptiste Falcon, and the automatic cylinder mechanism of Jacques Vaucanson.

Initially unreliable, the Jacquard mechanism was continuously perfected by others, such as Albert Dutillieu and Jean-Antoine Breton (who developed the card-chain drive in 1817). Despite these collective improvements, the machine retained the name "Jacquard Loom."

Investment in mechanization was driven by a permanent labor shortage. Indeed, the population of Lyon was only 102,000 in the early 1800s, compared to 150,000 on the eve of the Revolution, and only reached 120,000 by the end of the Empire.

During the 19th century, the mechanized loom became standard for plain or simple patterned silks. The Jacquard loom, once perfected, was a great success; the number of such looms rose from 41 in 1811 to 1,879 in 1820.

==== From the Restoration to the Third Republic: Expansion and Apogee ====
The upheaval of social structures saw the rise of the bourgeoisie who, like the nobility, desired silk. The 1814 Restoration also allowed the industry to diversify into liturgical vestments. By mid-century, Lyonnais silk was dominant globally. During the Second French Empire, it was France's most important export industry. This prosperity resulted from three factors: the silk merchants (soyeux) who invested in new markets; a mass of independent weavers (Canuts) with high levels of skill; and a scientific/artistic sector allowing for permanent innovation.

===== Organization of the "Fabrique" =====
Fabric production within the Fabrique was highly fragmented. It was rare for merchant-manufacturer houses to employ weavers directly. Instead, they acted as contractors, hiring workshop masters (chefs d'atelier). Similarly, merchants often sold through agents (commissionnaires) who placed products in cities worldwide.

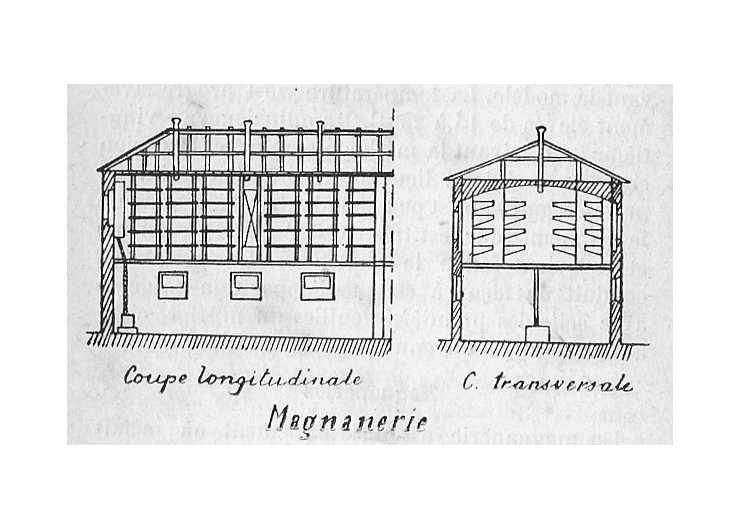
Schematic diagram of a silkworm nursery (magnanerie).

====== Silk supply ======
Between 1815 and 1849, silk consumption quadrupled. Silk houses had to constantly find new sources of raw silk or "greige" silk.

Masters of the Fabrique generally did not own their own production fields, instead buying from specialized firms or foreign intermediaries. Until mid-century, raw silk came equally from the Cévennes and from Piedmont or Asia. A few companies invested in production units, such as Palluat-Testenoire, which owned five factories near Mount Lebanon, or Charles Payen, who established a thriving spinning business in India starting in 1845.

The Lyonnais presence in China was more notable, facilitated by the commercial exploration mission of Théodore de Lagrené (1843–1846). Commissioned by the French government, the stay lasted two years and gathered a large collection of textiles and reports on Chinese weaving techniques. The first house to settle there was that of Paul Desgrand. Trade flourished thanks to the foreign concessions, the establishment of a direct maritime line between Marseille and Shanghai, and the creation of warranting structures.

In the 1850s, Cévennes silkworm farms were hit hard by diseases: pébrine, flacherie, and muscardine. Despite the work of Louis Pasteur, production collapsed. Silk workers then procured raw materials primarily from China. Control over this sector was facilitated by the 1860 free-trade treaty with the United Kingdom, allowing Lyon to dominate English competitors in the raw silk trade. At the end of the Second Empire, Japan also became a supplier. The house of Hecht, Lilienthal & Co. gained a near-monopoly there, supplying equipment to the Imperial Japanese Army and being paid in raw silk.

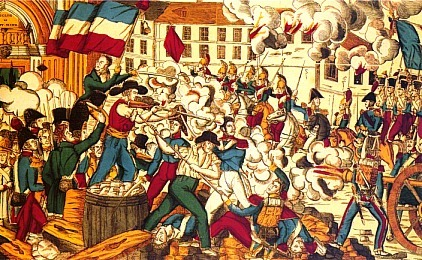
Battle in the streets of Lyon during the Canut Revolt, October 1831.

====== Production ======
Beneath a very tight elite, a large mass of workers populated the Fabrique, which during the July Monarchy was "perhaps the largest European concentration of workers employed in a single industry." Unlike other industries, Lyonnais silk remained artisanal for a long time. The first power loom was only installed in 1843, and there were only 7,000 by 1875. In 1866, there were 30,000 looms in Lyon and 95,000 in the surrounding countryside.

Initially concentrated in the city, particularly on the hill of La Croix-Rousse (an independent commune until 1851, exempt from the city's toll), production later dispersed into the Lyonnais, Beaujolais, Dauphiné, and Savoy. It was during this time that the term "Canut" emerged to describe the Lyonnais silk weaver.

Production was carried out by independent artisans paid by the piece. Tensions with contractors led to the Canut revolts of 1831 and 1834, where weavers unsuccessfully attempted to impose a minimum price for fabrication. Despite these revolts, general prosperity allowed weavers' living standards to gradually improve.

====== Markets ======
The silk merchants entirely controlled the outlets for production; workshop masters never sold the fabrics they made. Before 1815, most were distributed across the continent to European courts. Afterward, high customs barriers shifted sales toward the United Kingdom and the United States. By the 1870s, these two countries absorbed 70–80% of Lyonnais silk purchases.

Over the century, 80% of production was exported from France. This success ended other national production centers (Tours, Nîmes, Avignon). European competitors (Krefeld, Zurich, Manchester) also fell behind the Lyonnais Fabrique, often relegated to low-end products. The customer base also evolved, adding the rising European and American bourgeoisie to the traditional aristocracy.

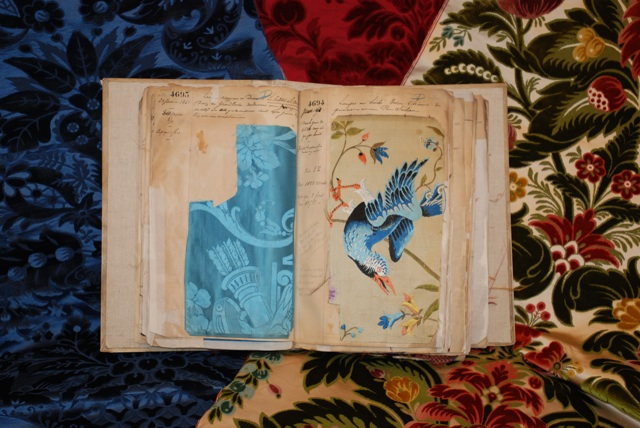
Pattern book from the Prelle house, 1861.

====== Major silk houses ======
Major names in 19th-century silk included: Arlès-Dufour, Baboin, Bellon & Couty, Bonnet, Dognin & Isaac, Falsan, Gindre, Giraud, Girodon, Gourd, Grand-frères (later Tassinari & Chatel), Guérin, Martin, Monterrad, Montessuy & Chomer, Payen, Pignatel, Riboud, and Testenoire. Dyeing houses included the Gillet family, Guinon, and Renard (founders of fuchsine).

The number of silk entrepreneurs doubled in the first fifty years of the century, eventually stabilizing at around 350 to 400 merchant-manufacturers. Concentration occurred; by 1867, the thirteen largest firms provided 57% of the silk woven in the region. These powerful houses had the funds to invest in machinery and integrate ancillary businesses such as dyeing and finishing. Geographically, these houses were concentrated at the base of the slopes of the Croix-Rousse, in the Tolozan and Croix-Paquet districts.

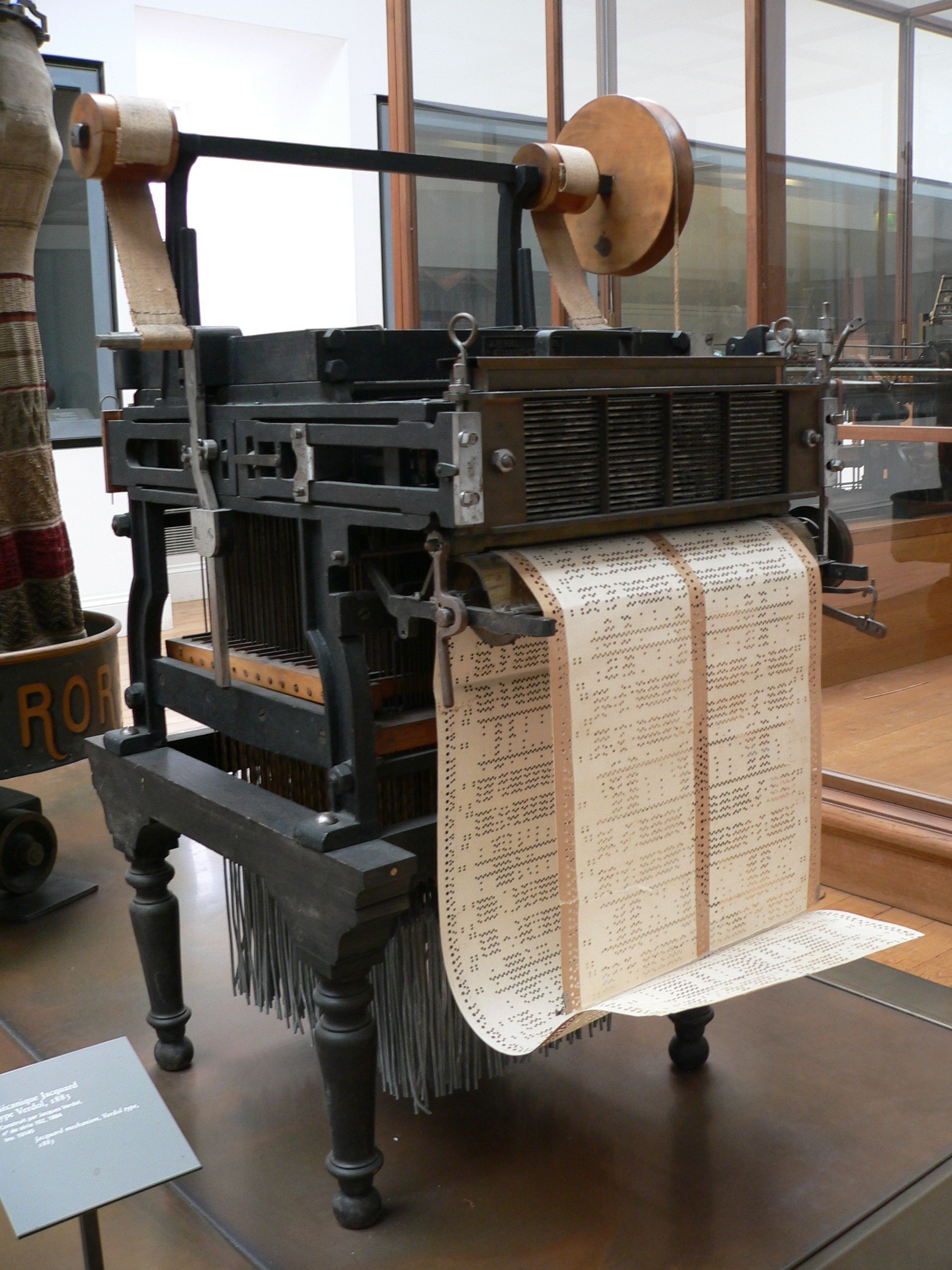
A Jacquard loom, the tool of Lyonnais prosperity, at the Musée des Arts et Métiers.

====== Economic success of the sector ======
During the first two-thirds of the 19th century, silk production drove the city's wealth, with annual growth rates of approximately 4%, while the French average was 1.5%.

== Lyon as an industrial and banking center ==
While Lyon's textile enterprises were almost exclusively structured around a family nucleus, other 19th-century industries often adopted more modern organizational forms, such as the limited partnership (commandite) or joint-stock company. This industrial takeoff began in the 1820s.

=== Non-silk textiles ===
Alongside the main silk industry (the Fabrique), and often fueled by its success, several other textile sectors experienced significant growth.

- Precious metal thread: The production of gimp and the drawing of gold and silver into precious metal threads flourished, directly linked to the luxury orders received by the silk trade. Under the First Empire, Lyon had 112 houses in this sector, concentrated around the Place des Terreaux.
- Trimmings and ribbons: This sector gradually lost importance as production shifted to Saint-Étienne and Saint-Chamond. The workforce, once totaling 600 people, steadily declined.
- Hosiery and tulle: This activity grew from the First Empire onwards. At the time, 9,000 people were employed in the trade, and major firms attempted to compete with the industry elite: English tulle.
- Embroidery: Grouped into 45 houses during the First Empire, over 500 embroiderers shared a fortune similar to the Fabrique. Closely tied to silk activities, embroidery firms were headquartered between Place des Terreaux and Croix-Paquet.
- Cotton: A marginal sector after the French Revolution, it developed under the First Empire due to high demand and the 1806 blockade against England.
- Hatmaking: A sector in decline since the First Empire, its workshops eventually relocated to Grigny and Chazelles.

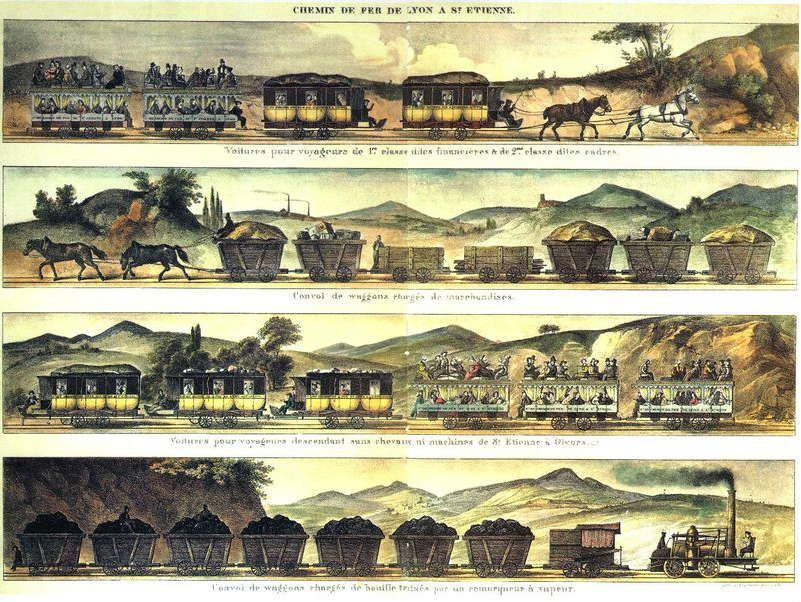
Four trains on the Saint-Étienne – Lyon line: passenger and freight trains with horse traction; a descending passenger train without traction; and a coal train pulled by a pre-1835 locomotive.

=== Transport ===
The development of transport was the most prominent indicator of Lyon's industrial transformation. Between 1826 and 1832, the engineer Marc Seguin built a connection between Lyon and Saint-Étienne, which was one of the first railways in the world and the first in France. In 1854, the Vaise station established a link with Paris, and by 1857, the excavation of a railway tunnel under Fourvière allowed the Paris–Lyon line to connect at Perrache station with the Lyon–Marseille line, forming the Paris-Lyon-Méditerranée (PLM) network. Three river ports (gares d'eau) were created during these years at Perrache, Givors, and Vaise to absorb the increasing Rhône traffic, which grew by 122% between 1828 and 1853. Throughout this period, numerous transport companies, often highly profitable, exploited both waterways and railways.

==== River shipping ====
Before the advent of the steam engine, river transport relied on flat-bottomed boats carrying up to 200 tons with a crew of three to five mariners. Descending the Rhône took a few days, but the return journey (la remonte), aided by mules or horses, lasted one to three months. In 1826, an entrepreneur named Dubost started a steam tugboat company; unfortunately, his boat exploded on March 4, 1827, near the Pont de la Guillotière, causing about twenty deaths. The Société des bateaux à vapeur pour la navigation du Rhône, created in 1829, built a 19-meter wooden boat named "Le Pionnier" which could reach Arles in 13.5 hours.

By 1839, companies like the Compagnie des Papins and the Compagnie des Sirius used boats built at Le Creusot that could travel from Lyon to Avignon in 12 to 15 hours. Shipping continued to prosper until the mid-century, with 20 companies headquartered in Lyon. The fleet peaked in 1853 with 60 boats on the Rhône and 34 on the Saône. However, the completion of the railway between Lyon and Avignon in 1855 effectively ended large-scale river transport.

==== Metallurgy and mechanics ====
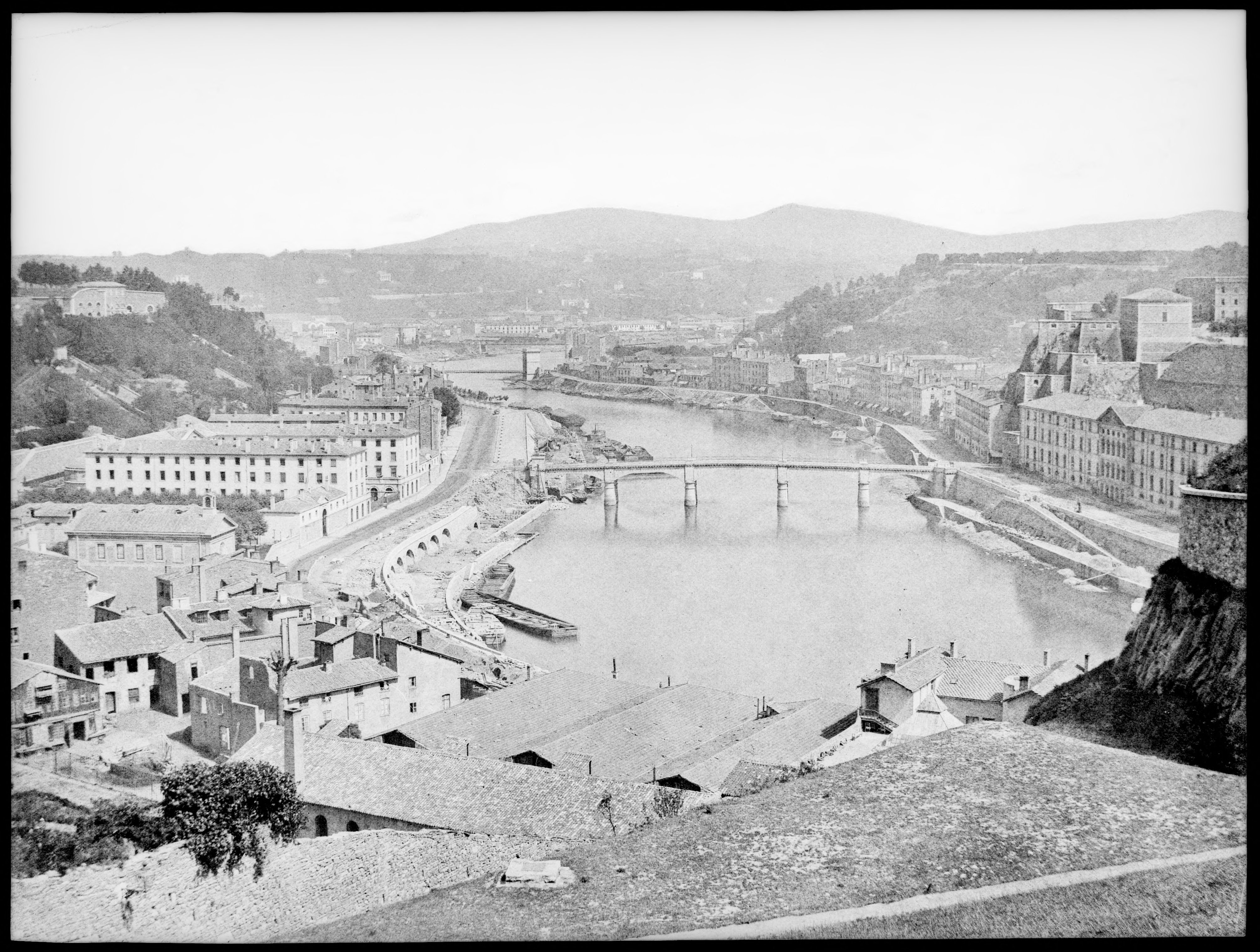
The Vaise district, a major center of Lyonnais industrial development during this era.

Metallurgy and mechanical engineering saw strong growth in Lyon. The implementation of the Jacquard loom spurred a culture of complex mechanical systems. Subsequent inventions, such as Barthélemy Thimonnier's sewing machine and the Lumière brothers' cinematograph, were indebted to the mechanical techniques of the silk loom. Metallurgy benefited from easy access to raw materials from Saint-Étienne by both water and rail. The most powerful metallurgical firm was that of the Frerejean family, which became Lyon's first joint-stock company in 1821 and grew to be France's leading metallurgical company by mid-century.

=== Chemistry ===
The chemical industry was well-represented in Lyon because silk preparation and dyeing required mastery of numerous chemicals, many derived from sulfuric acid. From the Napoleonic era, many entrepreneurs established artisanal workshops in peripheral districts to provide basics for silk dyeing. Key industrial houses emerged, such as the Perret-Olivier factory (absorbed by Saint-Gobain in 1872) and the Maison Renard, which achieved success through the exploitation of fuchsine. In 1856, the discovery of mauveine by William Henry Perkin sparked intense interest in synthetic dyes, leading Lyonnais chemists like Emmanuel Verguin to synthesize fuchsine in 1858.

=== Technical education and banking ===
Technical education began early in Lyon with the 1826 founding of the École de la Martinière. To meet the growing need for technicians, the École Centrale de Lyon was founded in 1857, followed by a Business School in 1872. In the banking sector, the development began with the Banque de Lyon in 1835. It was not until the 1860s that modern retail banking arrived, notably with the 1863 founding of Crédit Lyonnais by Arlès-Dufour and Henri Germain.

== Religious life ==
The Concordat reconstruction in Lyon was exceptionally rapid and brilliant. With the formation of new congregations, the rise of Marian devotion, and the emergence of a vibrant "social Catholicism," the city remained a Catholic stronghold.

=== Revival after the Revolution ===
Under the leadership of Joseph Fesch, Lyon did not experience significant religious detachment after the Revolution. During the Imperial period, the number of ordinations surged. Fesch worked to make Lyon a model for religious restoration, renovating seminaries and developing institutions like the Christian Brothers.

During the first half of the century, Lyonnais Catholicism saw a vigorous revival through groups like the "Congregation of Lyon," a secret religious and royalist body. Simultaneously, Pauline-Marie Jaricot founded the "Reparatrices of the Heart of Jesus" and played a pivotal role in funding global missions through the "Mission Penny" (sou des missions). While a solid Jewish community established itself with the Great Synagogue of Lyon in 1864, anti-clerical currents also grew, fueled by socialist and anarchist ideals.

=== The social question ===
The rapid growth of the working class forced Catholics to address the "Social question." Through figures like Frédéric Ozanam, founder of the Society of Saint Vincent de Paul, and Cardinal de Bonald, who denounced the injustices suffered by workers, social outreach became central to Lyonnais faith. Another innovative institution, the Prado, was founded by Father Antoine Chevrier to provide education and spiritual support to the poor of the La Guillotière district.

=== The Mystic School of Lyon ===
In the early 19th century, an original current known as the Mystic School of Lyon sought unity between experimental sciences and authentic Catholicism. Its most famous proponents were the scientist André-Marie Ampère and the philosopher Pierre-Simon Ballanche. This thought was disseminated through the Revue du Lyonnais, founded by Léonard Boitel and François-Zénon Collombet.

== Cultural and intellectual life ==
On a cultural level, this era was marked by the birth and prosperity of the Lyon School of Painting, which was closely linked to the mystical currents unique to the city. In parallel, the emergence and formalization of the "Lyonnais spirit" shaped the collective mentality of the population. One of the most enduring symbols of this spirit is the puppet Guignol; initially popular among laborers and craftsmen, he eventually became a figure representing all of Lyon.

=== The Lyon School of Painting ===
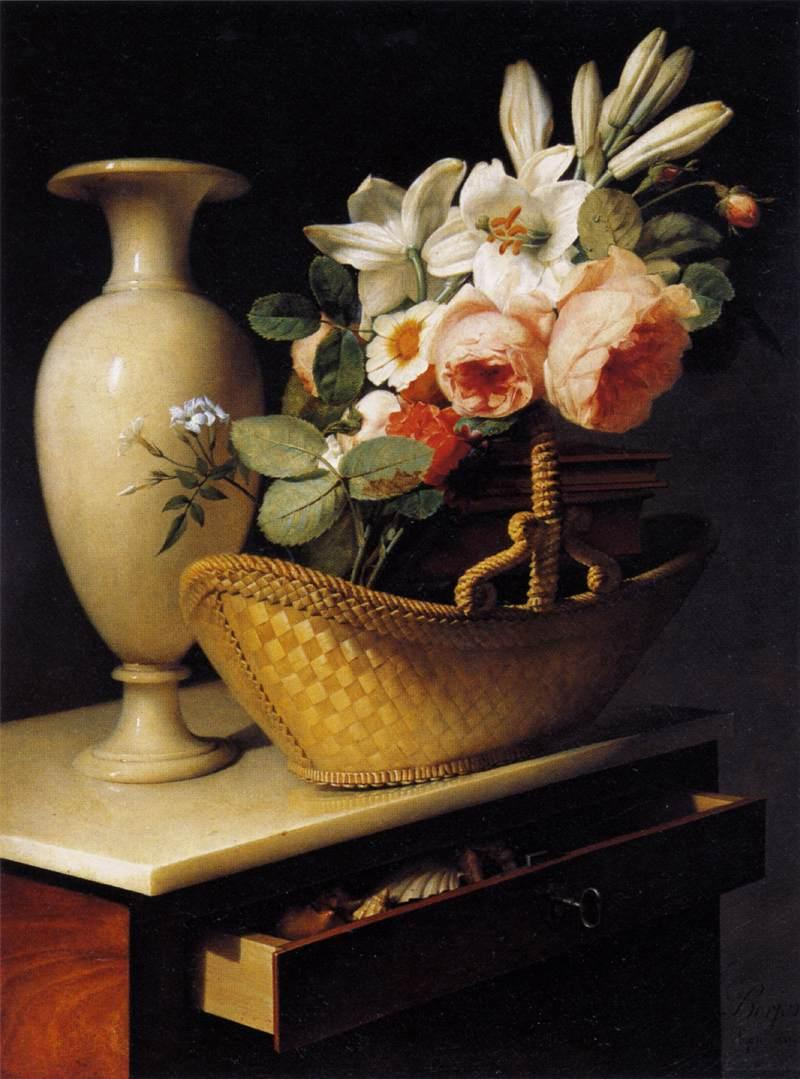
Antoine Berjon, Still-Life with a Basket of Flowers in a Basket on a Chiffonier, 1814, Louvre

From the 1810s throughout the century, Lyon was the center of a recognized pictorial movement, gaining national acclaim as early as the Paris Salon of 1819.

==== The Lyon School of Fine Arts ====
The Lyon School of Painting grew around the Imperial School of Fine Arts (École impériale des Beaux-arts), which evolved from a revolutionary-era flower-drawing school. Founded in 1807 alongside the Museum of Fine Arts of Lyon and housed in the Palais Saint-Pierre, the school's first director was François Artaud. Its founding professors included Joseph Chinard, Pierre Revoil, Alexis Grognard, Jacques Barraband, Pascal Gay, and Antoine Leclerc. Influenced by Romanticism, they viewed art as a sacred calling intended to "shape the taste of nations."

==== Early developments ====
In its early years, the style included the Troubadour style, floral painters in the Dutch tradition—who were often designers for the silk industry—and landscape painters. A key figure was Antoine Berjon, who was trained in silk design but turned toward easel painting. He taught his floral decorative techniques to numerous students, leaving a lasting mark on 19th-century Lyonnais painting.

The founders of the Troubadour style in Lyon were Pierre Revoil and Fleury Richard. Trained by Alexis Grognard and supported by Jean-Jacques de Boissieu and Berjon, they refined their skills in the studio of Jacques-Louis David. Their work focused on the Middle Ages with a high degree of historical accuracy, typically executed in small formats with soft lighting and somewhat static figures. This movement eventually paved the way for Pre-Raphaelitism.

Meanwhile, genre painting was highly favored in the city, represented by Michel Grobon, Jean-François Bellay, Antoine Duclaux, and Alexandre Dubuisson. They focused on scenes of rural life, craftsmanship, and landscapes, sharing the Troubadour school's meticulous attention to detail. Grobon is considered a founder of the local school and a precursor to local pleinairism.

==== Peak of the movement ====
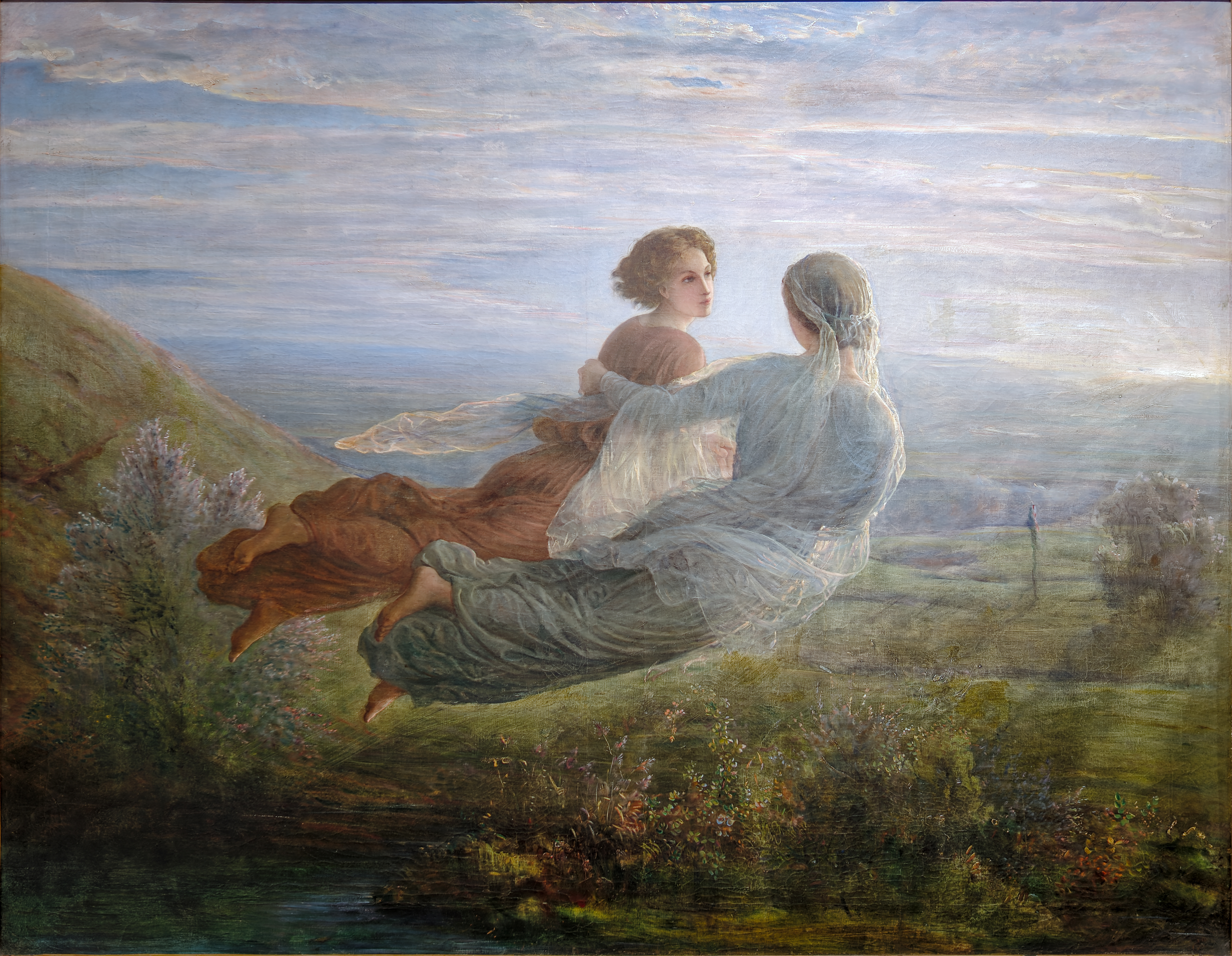
Louis Janmot, The Flight of the Soul, Museum of Fine Arts of Lyon

In the 1830s, the school distinguished itself with a movement inspired by Lyonnais mystical and Illuminist currents, featuring themes related to Freemasonry. This group was represented by two generations: first by Victor Orsel, and later by the Lyon students of Ingres, most notably Hippolyte Flandrin, Louis Lamothe, and Auguste Chavard.

Like the British Pre-Raphaelites, they drew from philosophical, moral, and religious themes, influenced by the Nazarene movement. They were prolific in religious painting, decorating major churches such as Notre-Dame-de-Lorette and the Abbey of Saint-Germain-des-Prés in Paris, as well as the Basilica of Saint-Martin d'Ainay in Lyon. This tradition continued with Louis Janmot and concluded with figures like Pierre Puvis de Chavannes and pre-impressionists such as Joseph Guichard and François-Auguste Ravier.

=== The "Lyonnais spirit" ===
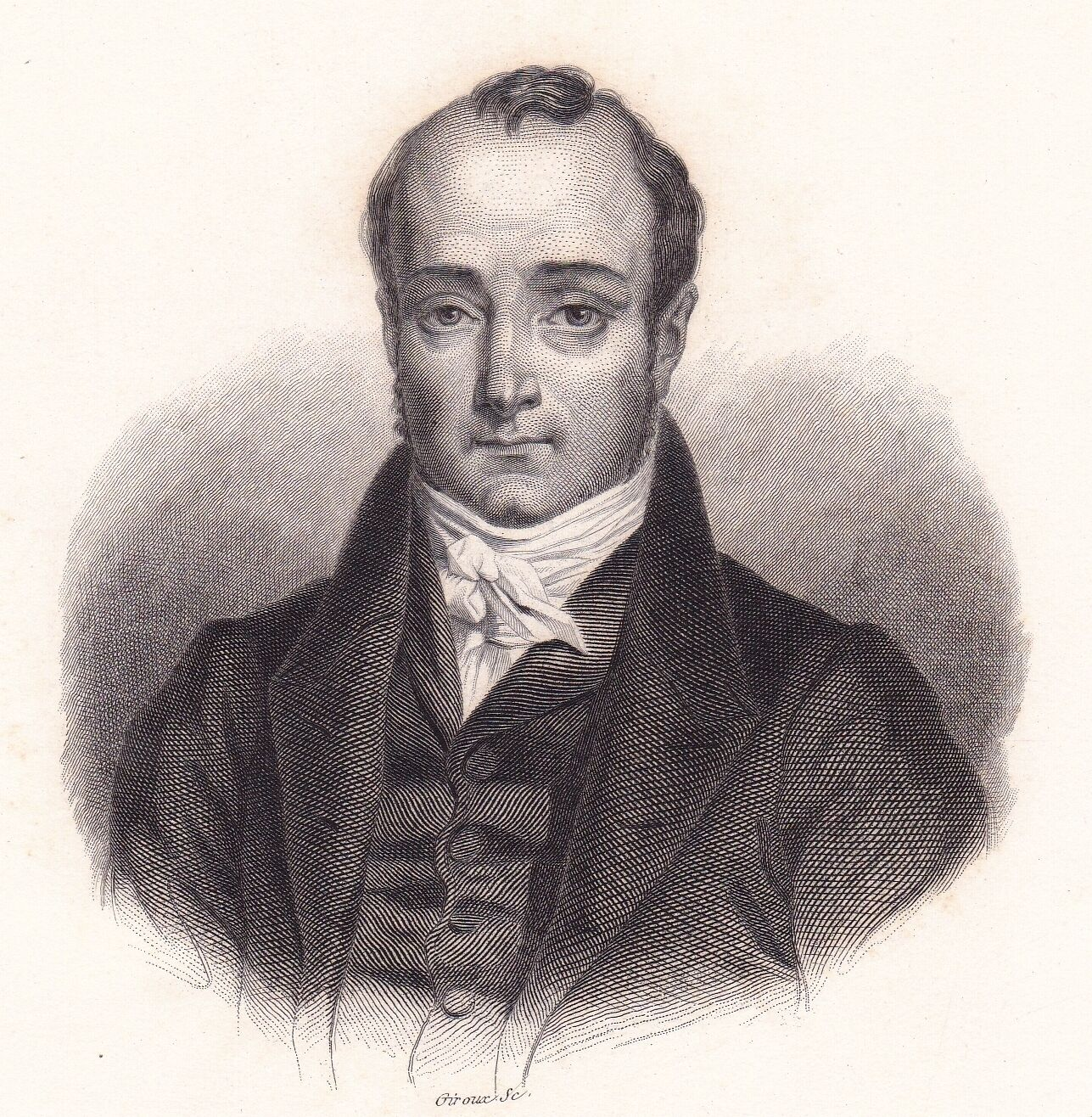
Paul Sauzet, a major promoter of the esprit lyonnais

Until the 18th century, the inhabitants of Lyon defined themselves by their geography, privileges, or trade (especially silk), but not as a distinct cultural group. The concept of a social "Lyonnais spirit" (l'esprit lyonnais) emerged in the 1830s, aligning with the rise of European nationalisms and positioned philosophically between Romanticism and German philosophy.

This identity was initially formalized in scholarly and literary circles, primarily through the Revue du Lyonnais (est. 1835). Various socio-political groups adopted the concept: Saint-Simonians saw it as a union of labor and religion; Legitimists viewed it as a stable model against a changing world; and Liberals saw it as evidence of local vigor capable of rivaling Paris.

The politician Paul Sauzet brought the debate into the political sphere. In 1868, he defined the Lyonnais spirit as the "union of two major traits: the love of religion and the love of work."

=== Guignol: A new form of popular theater ===
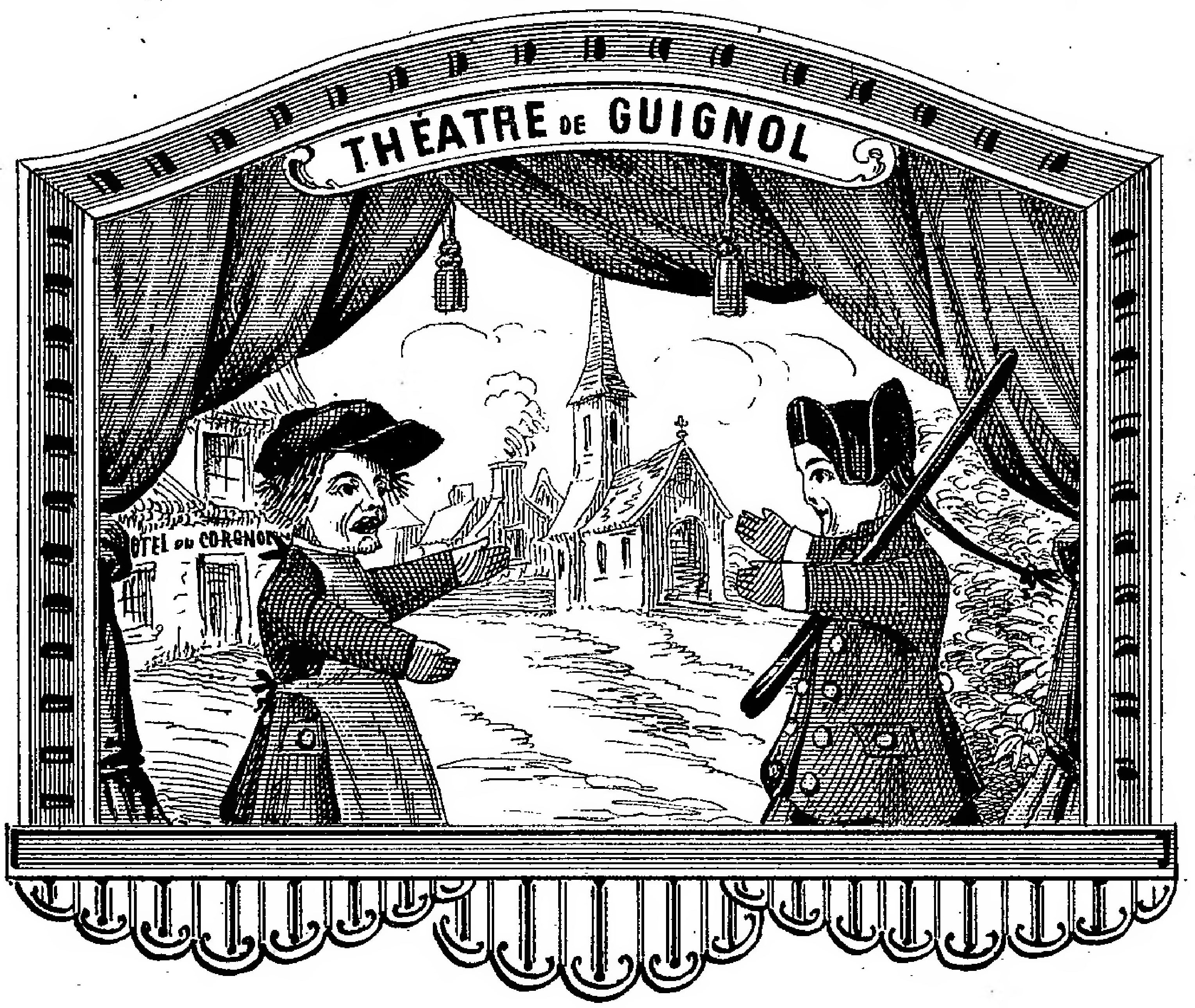
Engraving illustrating the play Le déménagement de Guignol, 1876

During the Bourbon Restoration, Laurent Mourguet, who had created the Guignol puppet a few decades earlier, performed primarily for poor laborers, dockworkers, and canuts. His troupe, formed in 1820, toured the region and performed in a cellar in Lyon near Ainay.

By the 1840s, Guignol theaters multiplied. During the Second French Empire, authorities closely monitored these performances to prevent anti-government criticism or social unrest. Censure measures requiring the submission of scripts before performance ironically helped preserve these plays, which had previously been improvised and unwritten.

== Notes and references ==
=== Bibliography ===
- Angleraud, Bernadette; Pellissier, Catherine (2003). Les dynasties lyonnaises: Des Morin-Pons aux Mérieux du XIXe siècle à nos jours [The Lyonnais Dynasties: From the Morin-Pons to the Mérieux from the 19th Century to the Present] (in French). Paris: Perrin. ISBN 2-262-01196-6.
- Béghain, Patrice; Benoit, Bruno; Corneloup, Gérard; Thévenon, Bruno (2009). Dictionnaire historique de Lyon [Historical Dictionary of Lyon] (in French). Lyon: Stéphane Bachès. ISBN 978-2-915266-65-8.
- Boudon, Jacques-Olivier (2017). La police sous le Premier Empire [The Police under the First Empire] (in French). Paris: Nouveau Monde Éditions. ISBN 978-2-36942-536-6.
- Cayez, Pierre; Chassagne, Serge (2006). Les patrons du Second Empire : Lyon et le Lyonnais [The Patrons of the Second Empire: Lyon and the Lyonnais] (in French). Paris: Picard / Éditions de la Maison des sciences de l'homme. ISBN 978-2-7084-0745-9.
- Cayez, Pierre (1993). L'industrialisation lyonnaise au xixème siècle: du grand commerce à la grande industrie [Industrialization in Lyon in the 19th century: from large-scale commerce to large-scale industry] (in French). Lyon: Université Lyon II.
- Chaudenneret, Blandine (2007). "L'enseignement à l'École des Beaux-Arts" [Teaching at the School of Fine Arts]. In Vincent, S. (ed.). La Peinture lyonnaise au XIXe siècle [Lyonese Painting in the 19th Century] (in French). Lyon: Mona Lisa. ISBN 9782859171933.
- Chaudenneret, Thérèse (1982). "L'enseignement du dessin à Lyon : l'école de Saint-Pierre" [The teaching of drawing in Lyon: the school of Saint-Pierre]. Revue de l'Art (in French). 57 (1): 57–65. doi:10.3406/rvart.1982.347936.
- Chopelin, Paul; Souriac, Pierre-Jean (2019). Nouvelle histoire de Lyon et de la métropole [New History of Lyon and the Metropolis]. Histoire des villes et des régions (in French). Toulouse: Privat. ISBN 978-2-7089-8378-6.
- Coural, Jean (2002). Soieries de Lyon: commandes royales au XVIIIe s. (1730–1800) [Silk fabrics from Lyon: royal orders in the 18th century (1730–1800)] (in French). Lyon: Musée des tissus de Lyon.
- Forray-Carlier, Anne; Valantin, Florence (2002). L'art de la soie: Prelle, 1752-2002: des ateliers lyonnais aux palais de l'Europe [The Art of Silk: Prelle, 1752-2002: From Lyonnais Workshops to European Palaces] (in French). Paris: Réunion des Musées Nationaux. ISBN 978-2-87900-713-7.
- Fournel, Paul (2008). Guignol, les Mourguet [Guignol, the Mourguets] (in French). Lyon: Éditions lyonnaises d'art et d'histoire. ISBN 978-2-84147-193-5.
- Gadille, Jacques; Fédou, René; Hours, Henri; de Vregille, Bernard (1983). Gadille, Jacques (ed.). Histoire du Diocèse de Lyon [History of the Diocese of Lyon]. Histoire des diocèses de France (in French). Vol. 16. Paris: Beauchesne. p. 128. ISBN 978-2701001982.
- Hardouin-Fugier, Elisabeth (1995). La peinture lyonnaise au XIXe siècle [Lyonnais Painting in the 19th Century] (in French). Paris: Editions de l'amateur. ISBN 2-85917-193-2.
- Latreille, André (1958). "Félix Rivet, La navigation à vapeur sur le Saône et le Rhône (1783–1863)" [Félix Rivet, Steam Navigation on the Saône and the Rhône (1783–1863)]. Revue de Géographie de Lyon (in French). 33 (4): 407–409.
- Lequin, Yves; Bayard, Françoise; Dubesset, Mathilde (1991). Rhône-Alpes : 500 années lumière : mémoire industrielle [Rhône-Alpes: 500 light years: industrial heritage] (in French). Lyon: Platypus Press. ISBN 2-259-02447-5.
- Léon, Pierre (1974). Géographie de la fortune et structures sociales à Lyon au XIXe siècle [Geography of Fortune and Social Structures in Lyon in the 19th Century] (in French). Vol. 88. Lyon: Centre d'histoire économique et sociale de la région lyonnaise. pp. 110–112. Archived from the original on December 21, 2017.
- Fierro, Alfred; Palluel-Guillard, André; Tulard, Jean (1995). Histoire et dictionnaire du Consulat et de l'Empire [History and Dictionary of the Consulate and the Empire] (in French). Paris: R. Laffont. ISBN 2-221-05858-5.
- Pelletier, André; Rossiaud, Jacques; Bayard, Françoise; Cayez, Pierre (2007). Histoire de Lyon: des origines à nos jours [History of Lyon: From Origins to the Present Day] (in French). Lyon: Éditions lyonnaises d'art et d'histoire. ISBN 978-2-84147-190-4.
- Privat-Savigny, Maria-Anne; Le Cacheux, Cécile; Chivaley, Sandrine; Ronze, Marie-Paule (2009). Lyon et la Chine : la collection Lagrenée [Lyon and China: The Lagrenée Collection] (in French). Lyon: Musée des tissus et des arts décoratifs. ISBN 978-2-908955-33-0.
- Rivet, Félix (1949). "La navigation à vapeur sur la Saône et le Rhône, 1783-1863" [Steamboat navigation on the Saône and Rhône rivers, 1783–1863]. Les Études rhodaniennes (in French). 24 (2): 97–107. doi:10.3406/geoca.1949.4635. ISBN 9782705959012.
- Saunier, Pierre-Yves (1993). "L'esprit lyonnais : XIXe-XXe siècle" [The Lyonnais Spirit: 19th-20th Century]. Vingtième Siècle. Revue d'histoire (in French) (40): 286–289. doi:10.3406/xxs.1993.3009.
- Tassinari, Bernard (2005). La soie à Lyon : de la Grande Fabrique aux textiles techniques [Silk in Lyon: From the Grande Fabrique to Technical Textiles] (in French). Lyon: Éditions lyonnaises d'art et d'histoire. ISBN 2-84147-151-9.
- Vernus, Pierre (2006). Art, luxe et industrie. Bianchini Férier, un siècle de soieries lyonnaises 1888-1992 [Art, luxury, and industry. Bianchini Férier, a century of silk manufacturing in Lyon, 1888–1992] (in French). Lyon: Éditions lyonnaises d'art et d'histoire. doi:10.4000/dht.1088.
- Vincent, Madeleine (1956). La peinture des XIXe et XXe siècles [Painting in the 19th and 20th centuries] (in French). Lyon: Éditions de Lyon. ISBN 978-2-914830-07-2.
- Zins, Ronald (2005). Lyon sous le Consulat et l'Empire [Lyon under the Consulate and the Empire] (in French). Reyrieux: Horace Cardon. ISBN 2-913020-05-4.
- Zins, Ronald (1998). 1814, l'armée de Lyon: ultime espoir de Napoléon [1814, the Army of Lyon: Napoleon's last hope] (in French). Reyrieux: Horace Cardon. ISBN 2-913020-02-X.
