= Jean-François Bony =

French painter (1754–1825)

- Born: 24 February 1754; Givors, France
- Died: 1825 (aged 70–71); Paris, France
- Occupations: Painter, draftsman, embroiderer, silk manufacturer, flower painter
- Known for: Fabric designer for Marie Antoinette, Empress Marie Louise, and Napoleon

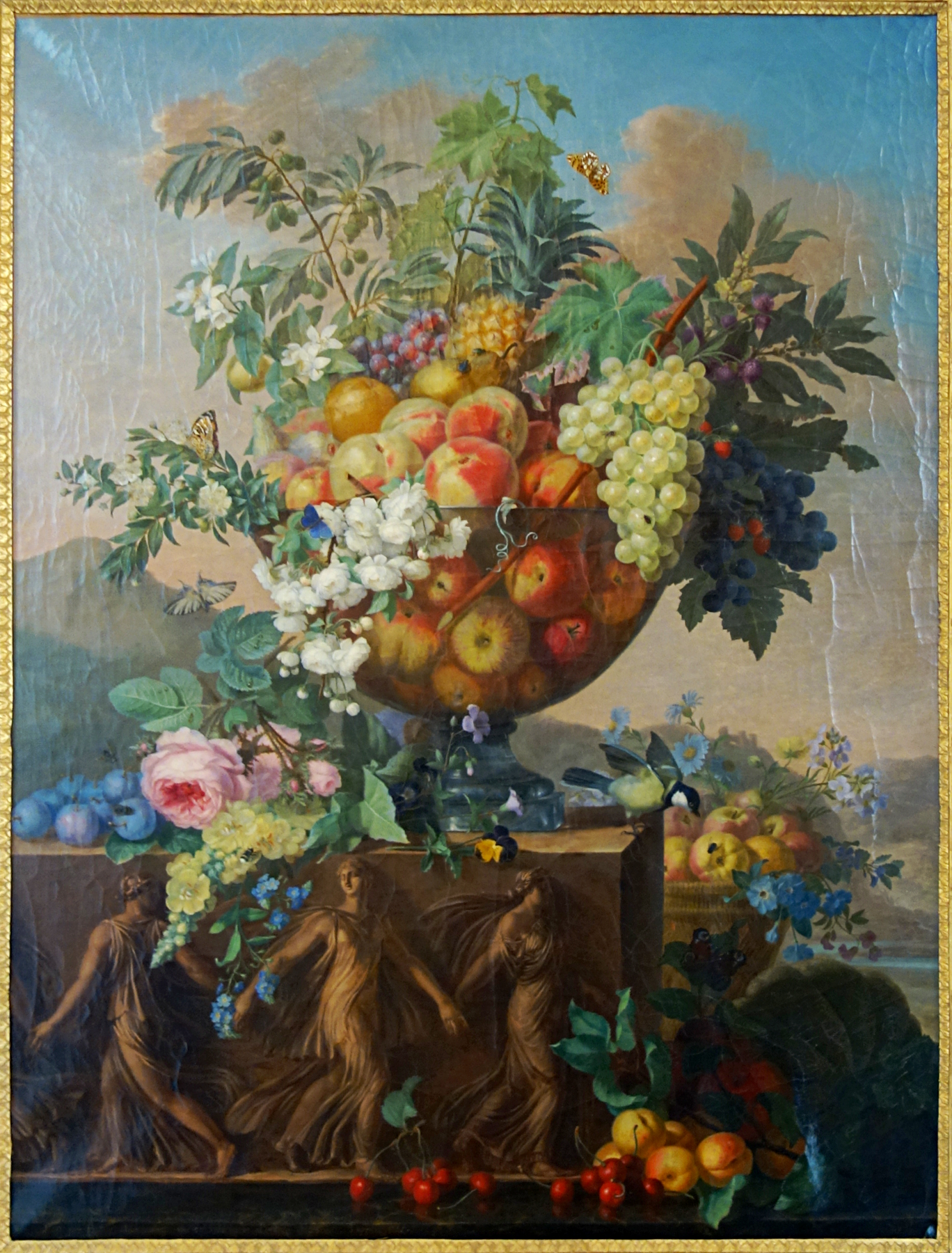
"Group of Flowers and Fruits"

Jean-François Bony (24 February 1754 – 1825) was a French painter, draftsman, embroiderer, silk manufacturer, and flower painter. A talented artist, his designs include studies of a dress and mantle proposed for the wearing of Joséphine de Beauharnais at the coronation of Napoleon. Bony was active before, during and after the French Revolution, also designing fabrics for Marie Antoinette, Empress Marie Louise and Napoleon himself.

== Life ==
Jean-François Bony was born on 24 February 1754 in Givors. He was the son of Nicolas Bony, a master baker, and Antoinette Mussieux. He was apprenticed to Nicolas Peillon, and then began his training at the École de dessin de Lyon (School of Art and Design in Lyon) at the age of 25. The École was designed to aid Lyon's silk trade. He may have added to his artistic education in Paris. He worked for the manufactory of Marie-Olivier Desfarges on many works, including a furniture project for Marie Antoinette's state room. In 1789, he took part in riots in Givors. In 1792 he was married to Jeanne-Marie Drevet (1764–1846).

After the Revolution, he continued to work as an embroiderer, possibly for the company of Rivet in Lyon. He worked on the chiffon dress which won the company of Camille Pernon a gold medal at "l’Exposition des produits de l’industrie" (The Exposition of Industrial Products) in the year X of the Revolutionary Calendar (1802). It was the beginning of a fruitful collaboration between Bony and Pernon. In 1804 Bony submitted paintings to the Paris Salon (which are now exhibited at the Musée des beaux-arts de Lyon). When Napoleon and his empress visited Lyon in 1805, Bony was named as the manufacturer of his own designs. In 1806 Bony won a silver medal at the l’Exposition des produits de l’industrie for his embroidery; he was the only medalist awarded his prize due to the beauty of his design rather than the innovation of his technique. He was one of the founders of the company of Bissardon, Cousin and Bony, a Lyon silk manufacturer.

A pupil of Gonichon in Lyon, Bony replaced Jacques Barraband as the Professor of Flower Painting at the École de dessin de Lyon in 1809, on Barraband's death. He retired from his professorship in June 1810 when Antoine Berjon arrive to replace Barraband. In that year, the city of Lyon commissioned Bony to produce a coat and dress as a gift for the Empress Marie Louise. The company of Bissardon, Cousin and Bony dissolved in 1816 with the death of Jean-Pierre Bissardon. On the restoration of the French monarchy, Bony continued to be recognised as a craftsman during royal visits by Louis XVIII.

In 1820, Bony moved to Paris. In 1825, after losing a great deal of money in financial dealings with an associate, he committed suicide. His widow returned to Givors, and the city of Lyon bought parts of her husband's collection in 1829 and 1844 in order to give financial help to the widow Bony.

== Works ==
Bony's works are displayed at a variety of museums.

- "Group of Flowers and Fruits" at the Palais de Beaux-Arts, Lille.
- "Fleurs devant une fontaine antique : Le Printemps (Flowers in front of an Antique Fountain: The Spring)" (1804), "Groupe de fleurs et de fruits, devant la statue de Cérès : L'Été (Group of Flowers in front of a statue of Ceres: The Summer)", (1804) and "Vase de fleurs (vase of flowers)", (1812) at the Musée des beaux-arts de Lyon.
- His designs for fabrics worn by Marie Antoinette, Empress Josephine and Napoleon can be found in le musée des Tissus. The Musée des Tissus also holds the only remaining self-portrait of Bony. The museum also holds most of his other remaining works in silk and two of his known paintings.

Several of his works are also owned by the Metropolitan Museum of Art and the musée de la Vie romantique.

Bony twice exhibited at the Paris Salons. In 1804, he exhibited Deux tableaux de fleurs et de fruits, faisant pendant, listed as "Boni (de Lyon)", and in 1819 he exhibited Fleurs et fruits dans un vase de cristal as "BONY à Lyon, place Saintclair, n.8".
