= Paul Jean Pierre Sauzet =

French lawyer and politician

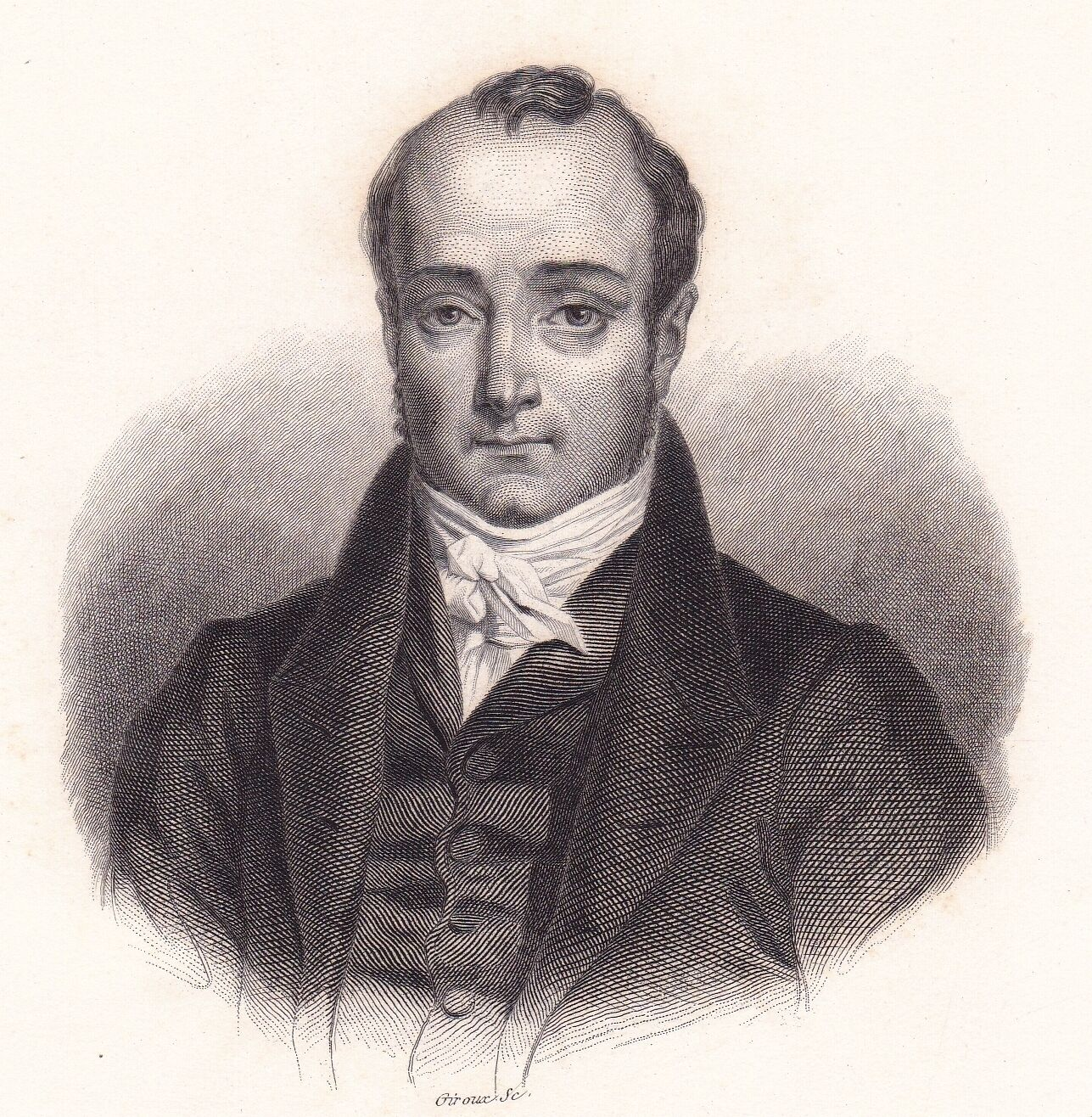
- Born: 23 March 1800; Lyon, Rhône, France
- Died: 12 July 1876 (aged 76); Lyon, Rhône, France
- Occupations: Lawyer, politician
- Known for: Minister of Justice and Religious Affairs

Paul Jean Pierre Sauzet (23 March 1800 – 12 July 1876) was a French lawyer and politician from Lyon who was Minister of Justice and Religious Affairs for a few months in 1836 and was President of the Chamber of Deputies from 1839 until the February Revolution of 1848.

== Early years ==
Jean-Pierre-Paul Sauzet was born on 23 March 1800 in Lyon. His father was chief doctor at the hospice de la Charité in Lyon. Sauzet received a bachelor's degree at the age of fifteen with a dispensation for his age. He was sent to the school of law in Paris, where he was distinguished for his speaking ability. After completing his studies he joined the bar in Lyon.

Sauzet pleaded in trials that ranged from major criminal cases to complex questions of commerce or administration. He was noted for his clarity of expression, lively speech and extraordinary ability to improvise. His reputation spread quickly and Jean Joseph Antoine de Courvoisier, formerly Attorney General in Lyon and now Minister of Justice, offered him a position at the Royal Court of Paris, which he refused.

== July Monarchy ==
Sauzet did not participate in the July Revolution of 1830, but welcomed the new government. Jean de Chantelauze, former keeper of the seals of King Charles X of France, chose Sauzet to defend him at the Court of Paris. Sauzet argued with great eloquence that the ministers had done their duty to the king, but after his fall had no further responsibility. His performance made his reputation. He was offered public office but preferred to remain an advocate. In 1833 Sauzet undertook the defense of General Saint-Priest, implicated in the affair of Carlo Alberto, and obtained his acquittal.

On 21 June 1834 Sauzet was elected Deputy for two districts of Rhone, Lyon and Villefranche, and chose to represent Lyon. He was liberal and independent, and sat on the center left. He was made vice-president of the chamber in 1836. Sauzet was appointed Minister of Justice and Religious Affairs in the cabinet headed by Adolphe Thiers announced on 22 February 1836. Sauzet left office on 6 September 1836 when the Molé-Guizot ministry began. He was one of the leaders of the coalition against the Molé ministry. Sauzet was re-elected on 4 November 1837, 2 March 1839, 9 July 1842 and 1 August 1846. On 4 May 1839 he was elected president of the chamber, remaining in this position until 1848. He always supported constitutional monarchy.

== Later years ==
Sauzet's political career ended with the February Revolution of 1848. He left Paris for Lyon, where he spent his time writing and studying legislative and religious subjects. He made several trips to Italy, and spent a long time in Rome. He was elected president of the Academy of Lyon three times. He died in Lyon on Lyon 12 July 1876, aged 76.

== Works ==
Sauzet's works included:

- La Chambre des députés et la révolution de février, Paris, 1851
- Réflexions sur le mariage civil en France et en Italie, Lyon, 1853
- Considérations sur les retraites forcées de la magistrature, Lyon, 1854
- Discours sur l'éloquence académique, Lyon, 1859
- Éloge de M. de Chantelauze, Lyon, 1860
- Rome devant l'Europe, Paris, 1860
- Les deux politiques de la France et le partage de Rome, Lyon, 1862

== Sources ==
- Chantelauze, Régis de (1865). Biographie de Paul Sauzet ancien président de la Chambre des députés. Impr. d'Aimé Vingtrinier.
- Muel, Léon (1891). Gouvernements, ministères et constitutions de la France depuis cent ans: Précis historique des révolutions, des crises ministérielles et gouvernementales, et des changements de constitutions de la France depuis 1789 jusqu'en 1890 ... Marchal et Billard.
- Robert, Adolphe; Couchy, Gaston (1891). "SAUZET (Paul Jean Pierre)". Dictionnaire des Parlementaires Français comprenant tous les membres des Assemblées Françaises et tous les Ministres Français depuis le 1er mai 1789 jusqu'au 1er mai 1889. Bourloton.
