= Aimé Vingtrinier =

French writer

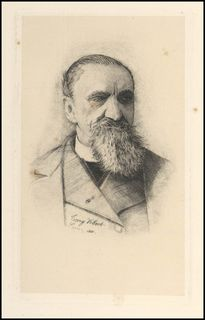
- Born: 31 July 1812; Lyon
- Died: 8 April 1903 (aged 90); Lyon
- Occupation: Printer

Aimé Vingtrinier (31 July 1812 – 8 April 1903) was a French printer, writer, amateur historian, figure of the 19th-century scholar.

He succeeded Léon Boitel as director of the Revue du Lyonnais after he took over the latter's printing press in 1852. He was head librarian of the city of Lyon in 1882.

== Publications ==
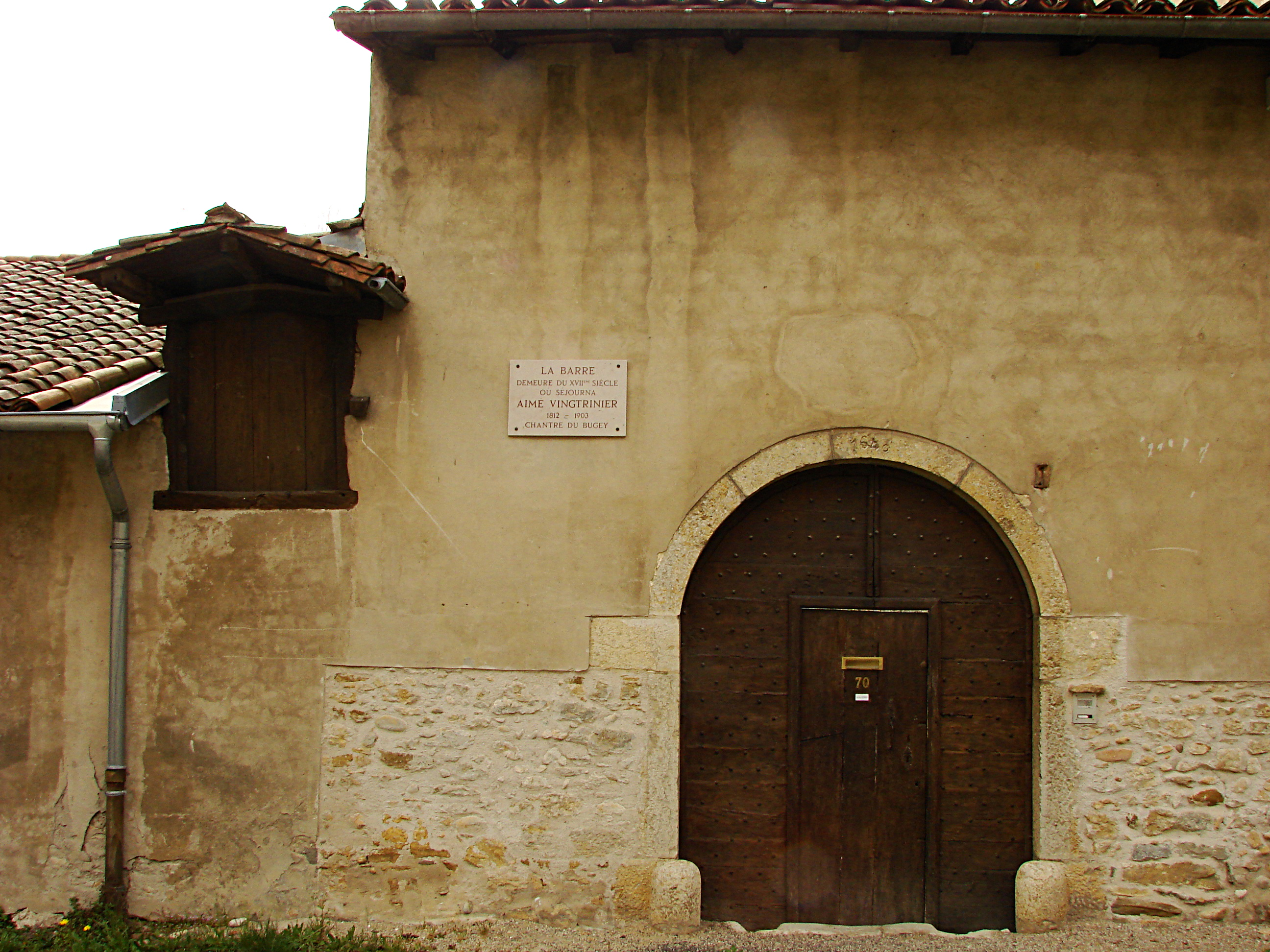
The house of la Barre where Aimé Vingtrinier lived.

- Fleury Epinat, peintre, 1854
- Traditions populaires comparées: mythologie, règnes de l'air et de la terre. (in collaboration with Désiré Monnier), 1854
- Note sur l'invasion des Sarrasins dans le Lyonnais, 1862
- La Paresse d'un peintre Lyonnais (Anthelme Trimolet), 1866
- Esquisse sur la vie et les travaux de Arthur de Viry, docteur-médecin, 1869
- Histoire du Château de Varey, 1872
- Vieux Papiers d'un imprimeur, 1872,
- Croyances populaires recueillies dans la Franche-Comté, le Lyonnais, la Bresse et le Bugey, 1874
- Paul Saint-Olive, archéologue lyonnais, 1877
- Henri Marchand et le Globe terrestre de la bibliothèque de Lyon, 1878
- La Statuette d'Oyonnax, 1880
- Les Vieux Châteaux de la Bresse et du Bugey, 1882
- À l'école, les bancs, les tables, la santé et l'éducation, 1882
- Lettre au sujet de deux inscriptions lyonnaises du musée de Lyon, 1882
- Fantaisies lyonnaises, 1882
- Zigzags lyonnais autour du Mont-d'Or, 1884
- Histoire de l'imprimerie à Lyon, 1884
- Une poype en Bresse, 1885, (read in the Sorbonne, 9 April 1885)
- Imprimeurs lyonnais. Jean Pillehotte et sa famille, 1885
- Inauguration du buste de Simon Saint-Jean, peintre de fleurs : le 26 juillet 1885, à Millery, 1885
- Notice sur Antoine Ponthus-Cinier : peintre lyonnais, 1885
- Soliman Pacha - Colonel Sève, généralissime des armées égyptiennes, ou Histoire des guerres de l'Égypte de 1820 à 1860, 1886
- Notice sur Hector Allemand : peintre lyonnais, 1887
- Un exemplaire d'Hippocrate annoté par Rabelais, 1887 (Le courrier de Lyon et du Sud-Est)
- Les incunables de la ville de Lyon et les premiers débuts de l'imprimerie (in collaboration with Marie Pellechet).
- De trois anciens voyages en Terre-Sainte, 1888
- L'escrime encore et toujours à Lyon (in collaboration with Cavalcabo and Ernest Gayet), 1889
- À la mémoire de Joséphin Soulary, 1891
- De Lyon à Uriage : épître à madame la marquise de Montrecoul, 1893
- Catalogue de la bibliothèque lyonnaise de M. Coste, 1893
- La famille des Jussieu et les deux Alexis, 1896, Correspondance historique et archéologique
- Étude populaire sur la Bresse et le Bugey, 1901

== Hommages ==
- Être Lyonnais. Collection : Identité et régionalité. Hommage à Aimé Vingtrinier. Texts collected by Benoit Bruno and Gardes Gilbert. Jacques André Editeur, 4 November 2005, Lyon. ISBN 978-2915009705, Foreword by Gérard Collomb; postface by Jean-Jack Queyranne.
