= Revue du Lyonnais =

Revue du Lyonnais was a French scholarship review based in Lyon, established by Léon Boitel and published from 1835 to 1924. It was subtitled, recueil historique et littéraire. In 1852, Léon Boitel sold his printing press to Aimé Vingtrinier (1812-1903) who continued the publication of the review until 1880.
