= Antoine Berjon =

French painter and designer (1754–1843)

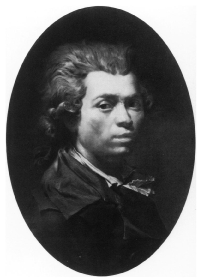
Grayscale image of Berjon's pastel Self-Portrait, late 1790s. The original suggests his accomplishment with color and light.

Antoine Berjon (17 May 1754 – 24 October 1843) was a French painter and designer, among the most important flower painters of 19th-century France. He worked in a variety of media including oil, pastel, watercolour, and ink.

Berjon was born in St Pierre de Vaise, a commune near Lyon, to the son of a butcher, and he first studied drawing with the local sculptor Antoine-Michel Perrache (1726–1779). His early history is not clear; according to his uncorroborated biographer J. Gaubin, he may have studied medicine or a religious vocation, learning flower painting during his novitiate. He went to work as a designer of textiles in Lyon's important silk industry until its collapse with the French Revolution.

Berjon's paintings from the 1780s are untraced. In 1791, the Paris Salon accepted four of his works, including Still Life of Peaches and Grapes. He visited Paris often in the early 1790s and moved there in 1794, becoming a friend of Jean-Baptiste Jacques Augustin (1759–1832), a painter of miniatures, and of Claude-Jean-Baptiste Hoin (1750–1817), a portraitist. Living in Paris for 17 years, he exhibited at the Salon at least five times.

By the time of his return to Lyon in 1810, his reputation had increased, and he became the professor of flower design at the newly established École des Beaux-Arts, which had been founded by Napoleon's decree in 1807 to revive Lyon's silk industry. He was dismissed in 1823 after a 13-year appointment, replaced by his gifted pupil Augustin Thierrat (1789–1870). His temperament probably put him in conflict with the school's administration; he was known for his stubbornness, and some contemporaries viewed him as egotistical, a characterization that remained throughout his life. He set up his own studio in Lyon, giving private instruction, and continued to make art for the last two decades of his life. He died in Lyon at the age of 89.

== Art ==
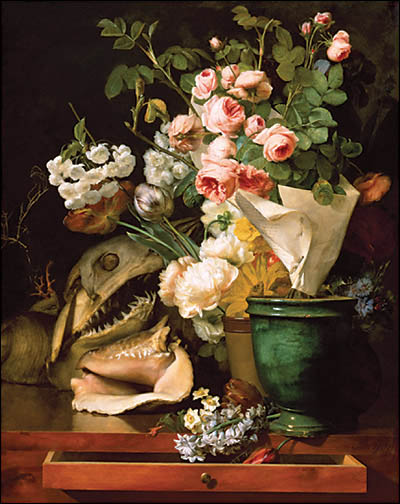
Still Life With Flowers, Shells, a Shark's Head, and Petrifications (1819), Philadelphia Museum Of Art

One of Berjon's important works is his Still Life With Flowers, Shells, a Shark's Head, and Petrifications (1819). He completed the painting while still professor at the École des Beaux-Arts. The work's detailed depictions of blossoms recall the Dutch flower painters of two centuries earlier, but the items accompanying the flowers suggest no ordinary still life. The skeletal shark's head and the seashells are at first incongruous, but show that Berjon has adapted his style to the era of the Enlightenment, diversifying the subject matter to represent the age's new sense of nature. The freshness and delicacy of the blooms contrasts with the age and permanence of the petrifications.

Bouquet of Lilies and Roses in a Basket Resting on a Chiffonier (1814), held by the Louvre, is also characteristic of his work. Berjon was a portraitist as well, and his portrait work includes J. Halévy with his Brother and Sister (1820).
