= Lyon during the Renaissance =

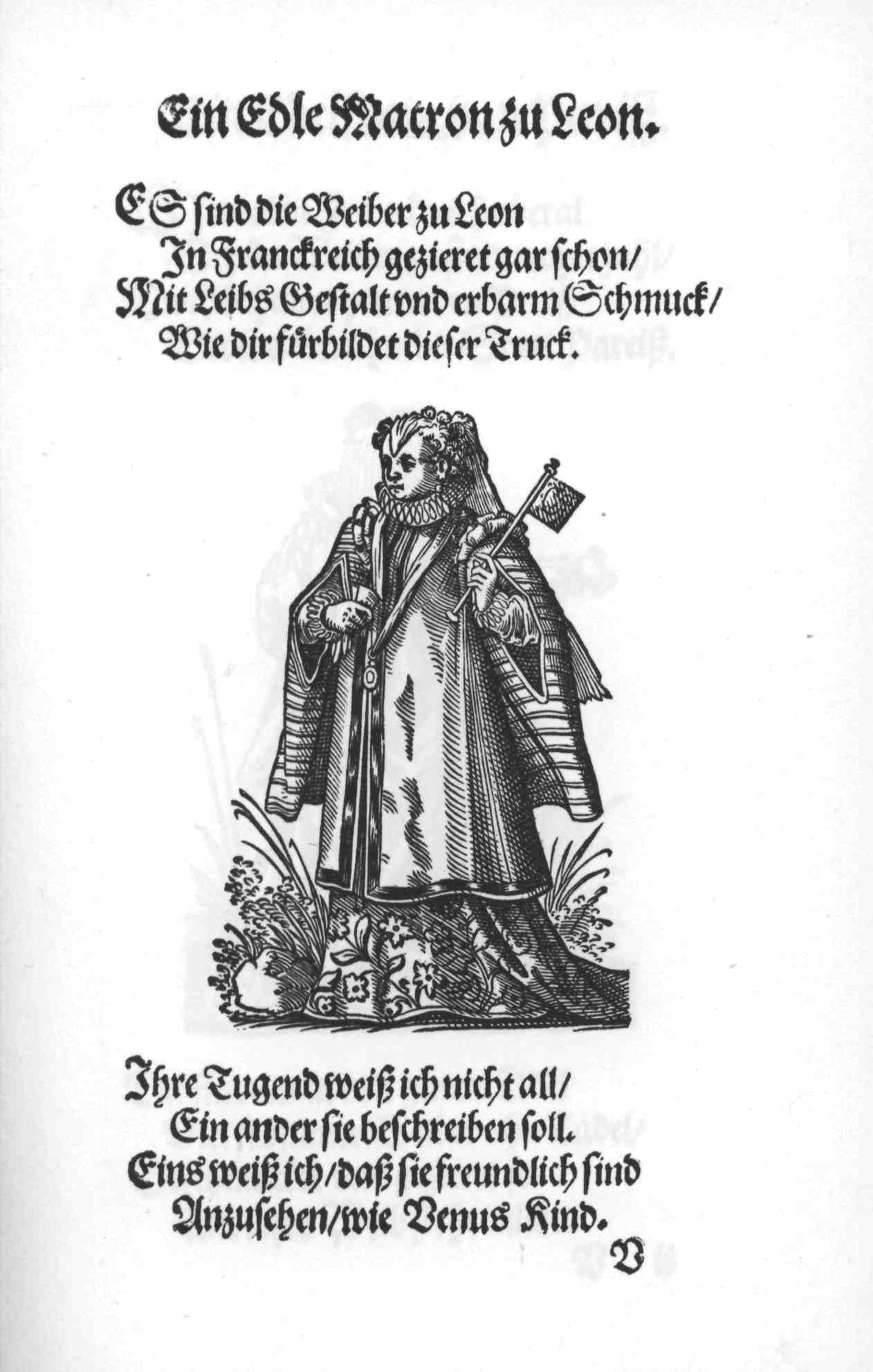
Lyon, depicted as a woman in the work of Conrad Lautenbach, known as "x, Torrentinus Mutislariensis" from 1586, engraved drawing by Jost Amman.

The Renaissance in Lyon concerns the history of the city of Lyon during the Renaissance.

It began in the middle of the 15th century with the establishment of the Fairs of Lyon by the French king Charles VII. This event placed the city at the center of major European commerce and revitalized the former episcopal city. Numerous foreigners, especially Italians, soon settled in the city, which became an important center of Renaissance culture, with significant banking and publishing activities. This era also saw the introduction and early development of the silk industry. During the Wars of Religion, the city experienced a brief Protestant occupation, followed by the Lyonnais vespers, a massacre of Protestants in the wake of the St. Bartholomew's Day massacre. Initially aligned with the Catholic League, Lyon submitted to King Henry IV after his conversion to Catholicism; the king subsequently reformed the consulate to secure the city's loyalty.

== The city and its inhabitants ==
The city along the Rhône experienced significant demographic and urban expansion during the Renaissance. While its boundaries did not expand substantially, it densified through the raising of buildings and the subdivision of undeveloped areas. Supported by increasing prosperity, numerous stone structures were erected, though no large prestigious public buildings appeared.

The most prominent Lyonnais institution was the consulate, which connected with the populace primarily through the pennons for policing duties and the General Alms for welfare. The political landscape was rounded out by the governor and the foreign nations.

=== Topography and architecture ===
Plan of the city of Lyon in the mid-16th century. (Note: 2 & 3: Saint-Vincent gate; - 4, 5, 6 & 7: Fortifications; - 8: Saint-Sébastien gate; - 9: Saint-Sébastien recluse; - 11: Saint-Clair recluse; - 12 & 13: Ferry and chains on the Saône; - 17: Saint-Éloi port.)

Driven by sustained prosperity, the city continually developed and rebuilt itself. Its overall layout remained largely unchanged; rather than sprawling outward, it densified inward. Gardens gradually shrank, and houses were rebuilt on-site with additional stories. However, the southern part of the Peninsula and the hill slopes (Note: The slopes of the Croix-Rousse hills, then known as the slopes of Saint-Sébastien and Fourvière.) remained unurbanized.

Faced with the evolving functions and socio-economic significance of their city, the consulate sought to adapt a still typically medieval urbanism (narrow streets, few public squares, homogeneous neighborhoods) to new demands. Over the 150 years of the Lyonnais Renaissance, the city's elites successfully transformed it: neighborhoods became distinct and specialized, public squares emerged, and key thoroughfares were improved. Nevertheless, they failed to achieve their ambition of glorifying the city with monumental works, as was seen in other major European cities of the era.

==== Morphology of civil buildings ====
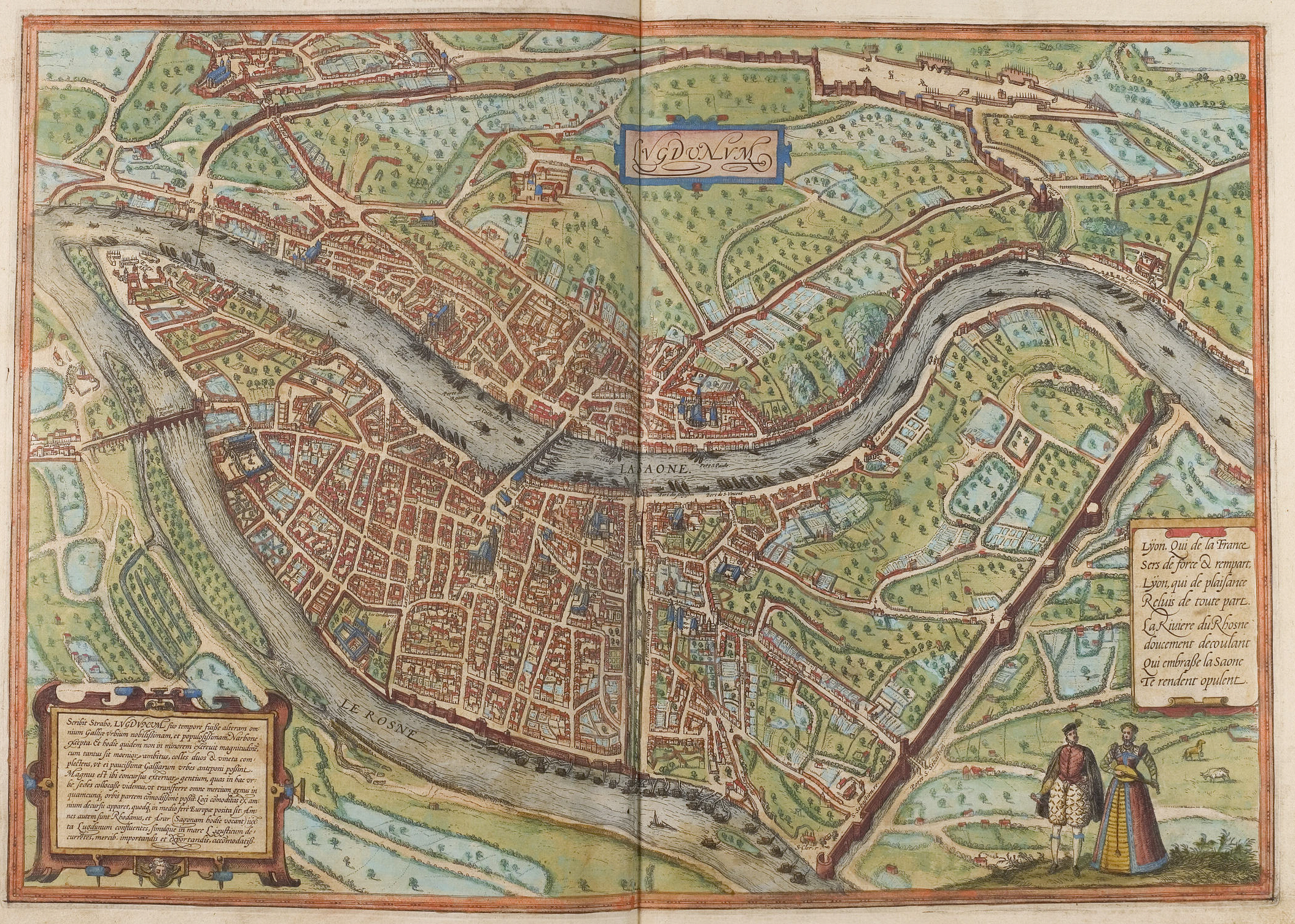
Map by Georg Braun created in 1572, from the Civitates orbis terrarum. Heidelberg University Library.

The rise in inhabitants per household coincided with the economic surge beginning around 1460. The right bank of the Saône, in particular, underwent a wave of demolitions to make way for taller, more opulent structures. Cultivated spaces vanished during this period, and throughout the 16th century, any building capable of being heightened was raised. Until the 1500s, architectural styles drew from Gothic influences, later evolving into an eclectic blend of various elements. The city's wealth enabled a renewal of Gothic building art, though the Renaissance style did not become predominant. This intense densification gave rise to traboules—private passages that, by necessity, became semi-public thoroughfares of ambiguous status, used by pedestrians navigating the narrow, congested streets.

Obtaining a comprehensive view of house morphologies from this era is (still) challenging, as even the extensive Old Lyon district features many partially rebuilt structures from later centuries. Generally, buildings were narrow (five to six meters wide) and deep (up to twenty meters), typically with two stories. Many connected to a rear building—sometimes up to four in total (as in the "Grande Traboule")—linked by galleries at each level, accessible via spiral staircases. Alongside these ordinary residences, numerous luxurious homes emerged from the 15th century onward, such as the Maison de la Rose on Rue Mercière, owned by the councilor Ennemond de Syvrieu and later by Jacques Cœur. (Note: See the list of Lyonnais councilors provided.) The grandest residences incorporating Renaissance elements, however, dated to the 16th century. These elite homes illustrated the gradual fusion of medieval Gothic (Note: See the Maison des Mayet de Beauvoir on Rue Lainerie.) with ancient motifs drawn from Italian Renaissance architecture. (Note: For example, the antique-style decorations on Rue des Trois-Maries.)

==== General evolutions ====
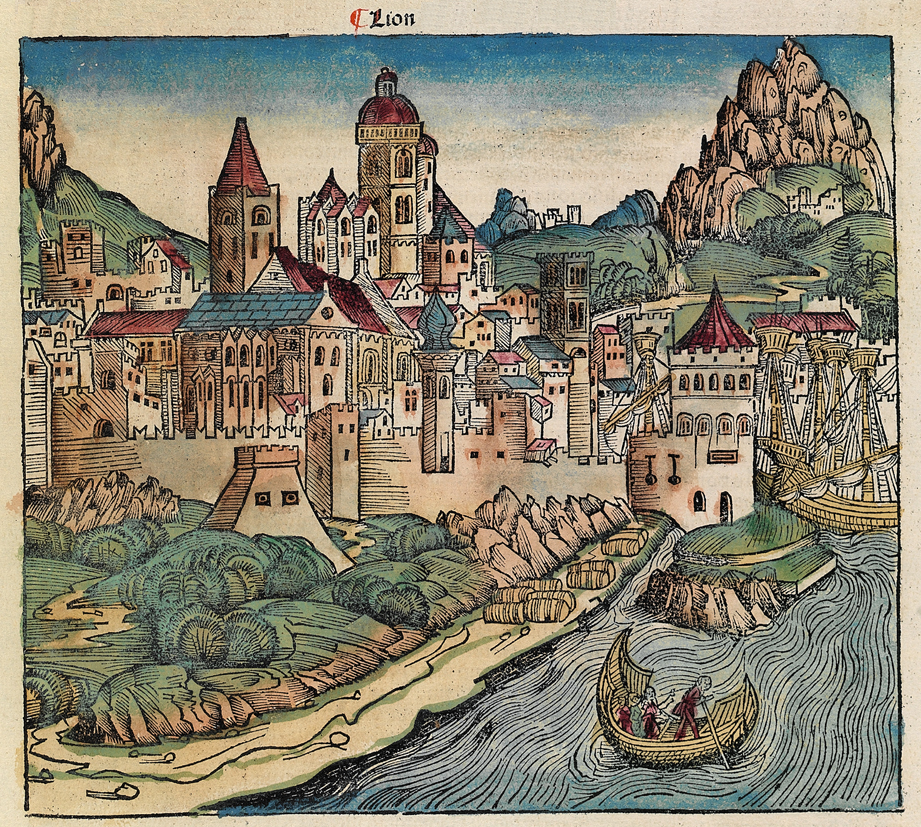
Illustration of Lyon from the Schedelsche Weltchronik by Hartmann Schedel, 1493.

Despite resistance and the consulate's lack of consistent resources, numerous changes in the urban fabric were evident across four successive phases.

From the mid-15th century to 1500, the city densified without significant new builds, primarily by elevating existing structures. Prosperity returned in the 1460s, but recovery from the Hundred Years' War took time. In 1468–1470, the consulate authorized some constructions on Rue Mercière or at the Saulnerie; concurrently, it contemplated demolishing the Saint-Vincent borough to bolster northern defenses or permitted the demolition of an alley to expand the Grandes Carmes cloister. Visible signs of urban evolution included the opening of two Saône ports: Saint-Éloi (1482–1483) and Saint-Paul (1485–1490).

From 1500 to 1540, new builds occupied wastelands and gardens. The city densification eliminated open spaces, resuming the horizontal expansion that had been interrupted since the mid-13th century. Only between 1540 and 1560 did systematic road rationalization begin, accompanied by the creation of new public squares. Finally, from 1560 to 1600, despite some alterations by the Protestant authorities for military circulation on major routes, urban development stabilized amid political and economic crises that limited resources.

Lyon lacked a political force strong enough to mobilize capital, champion large projects, and overcome opposition—as was the case in Paris or major Italian cities—explaining the absence of monumental civic buildings. Several mid-16th-century proposals made at the peak of prosperity, such as rebuilding Place du Change (the center of Lyonnais business) or erecting a civic palace, were not carried out.

===== Urban transformations =====
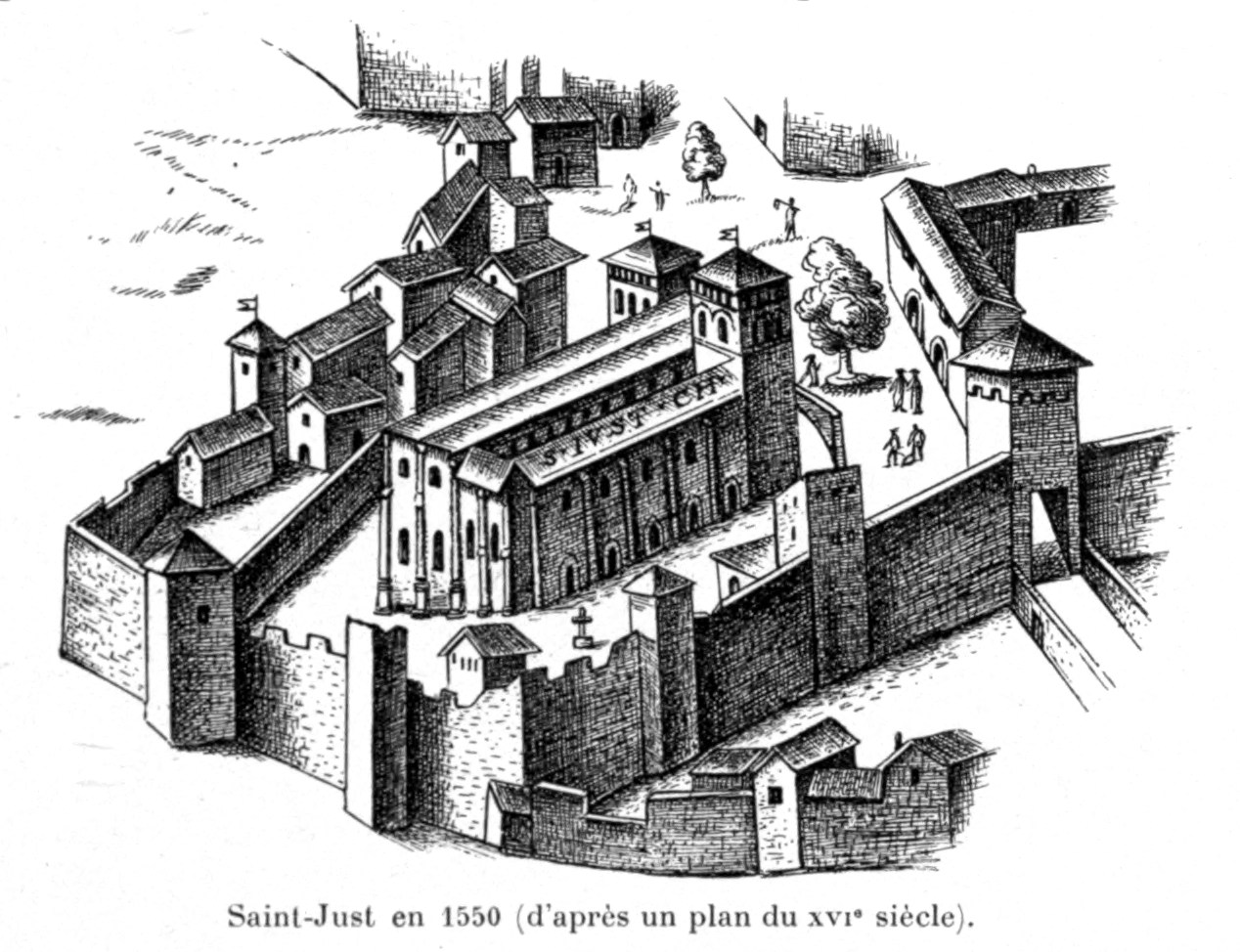
The Saint-Just cloister, destroyed by Protestants in 1562. Engraving from Histoire des églises et chapelles de Lyon by Jean-Baptiste Martin, 1908.

Lyon had to accommodate a larger, wealthier population and a massive influx of people and goods four times yearly during the fairs. This adaptation involved conflicts and resistance, with key changes enforced by the Protestant consulate, implementing long-debated measures.

At Fourvière's base, the canons' cloister at Saint-Jean Cathedral was forcibly opened by Baron des Adrets, who razed its walls in 1562. On the Peninsula, convent and church cemeteries became squares: Jacobins (1562), Cordeliers (1567), and Saint-Nizier (1593). The present-day Place Bellecour area served as military ground, redeveloped multiple times. At Croix-Rousse's foot, the ancient Terreaux ditch was filled to enable urban extension downhill. Similarly, the fortified Saint-Just cloister was dismantled from May to September, though it had been planned since 1525. (Note: See M. C. Guigue's synthesis, Destruction de l'église de Saint-Just, du cloître et de partie du faubourg par les protestants en 1562: enquêtes et procès-verbaux, Guigue (1879)) These efforts—eliminating wall vulnerabilities and creating drill squares—prepared for anticipated conflict.

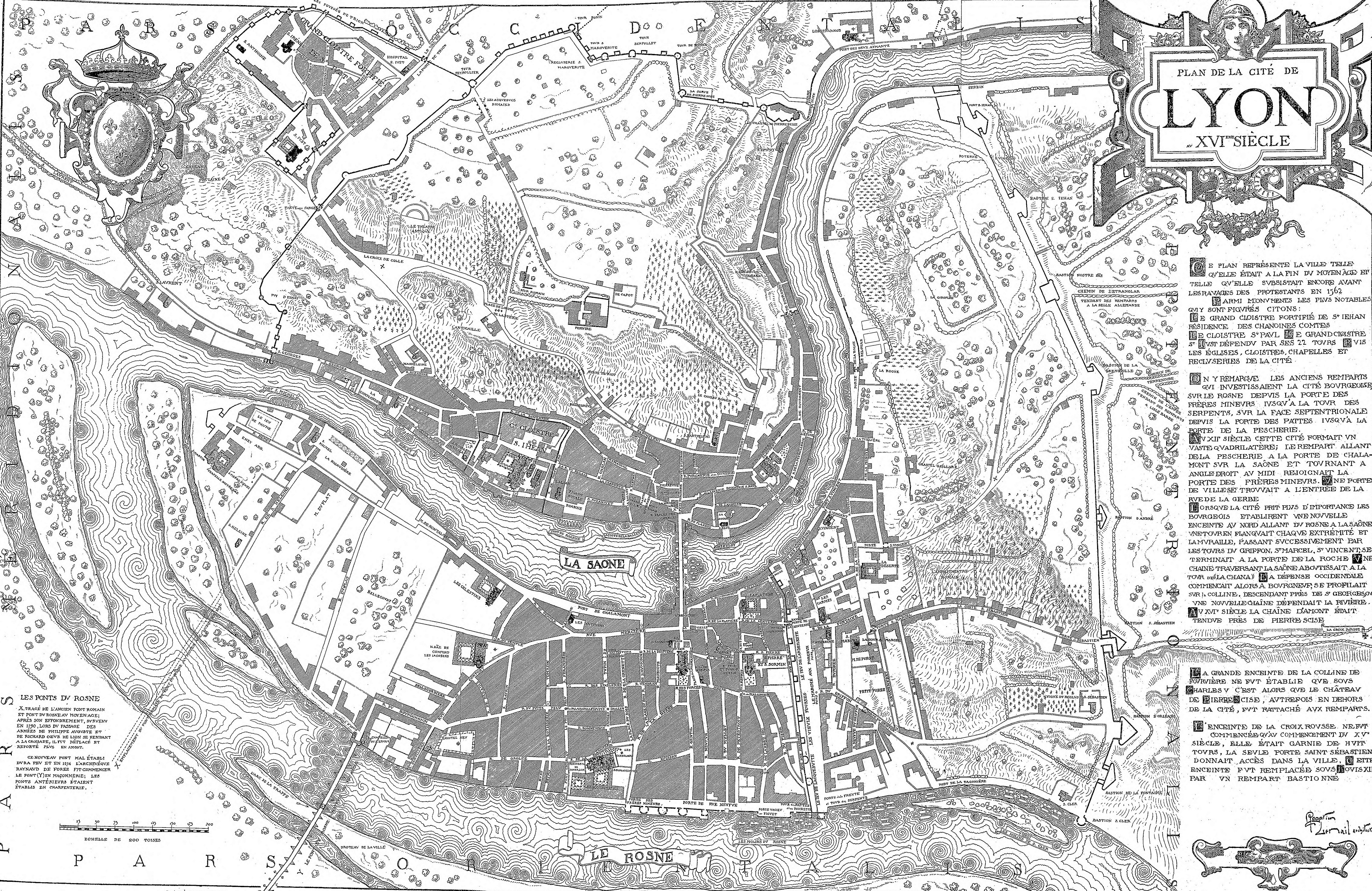
Plan of Lyon from Martin's Histoire des églises et chapelles de Lyon, 1908.

The traditional traversal axis—Rhône bridge, rues Bourgchanin, Confort, Mercière, and Saône bridge—was duplicated by one via Rhône bridge, Rue de la Barre, Place Bellecour, Port du Roi, Saône ferries, Port des Estres, rues Bombarde and Chemin-Neuf. Other streets were also developed. (Note: On road developments for military purposes, among others, see Vermorel, B. (1866). Historique et statistique des voies publiques comprises dans les quartiers de Bellecour, Ainay, Perrache et presqu'île Perrache [Historical and statistical survey of the public streets in the districts of Bellecour, Ainay, Perrache and the Perrache peninsula] (in French). Vol. 2. Lyon: Archives Municipales de Lyon.)

From the late 14th century, the consulate pursued a public water policy, securing concessions for religious-controlled sources to augment its own. The oldest public sources—Choulans, Saint-Épipoy, and la Chana—were supplemented in 1396 by fountains at Saint-Marcel, Sainte-Catherine, and des Gardes. In 1504–1506, Choulans sources were partially diverted to supply Saint-Laurent-des-Vignes hospital and three new fountains at la Blancherie, Maison Athanase, and Jardin des Fleur de Lys. By 1530, the city had about fifteen public fountains: twelve on the Saône's right bank and three on the left.

===== Socio-economic evolutions =====
Urban activity locations also shifted. The main cattle market, sited on Rue Juiverie until 1490 amid an expanding business district, relocated to Place de la Croix de Colle. (Note: Present-day Place des Minimes.) Similarly, the pig market moved from the center in 1513 to the Lanterne ditches. (Note: Between Place des Terreaux and present-day Rue Lanterne.) Slaughterhouses likewise shifted early in the 16th century from Saint-Paul and Saint-Nizier to Place de Bourg Neuf and the filled Lanterne ditches. These changes reflected municipal efforts to move polluting activities to the periphery, allowing the center to concentrate on residential use and reducing sources and spread of disease.

==== The city's neighborhoods ====
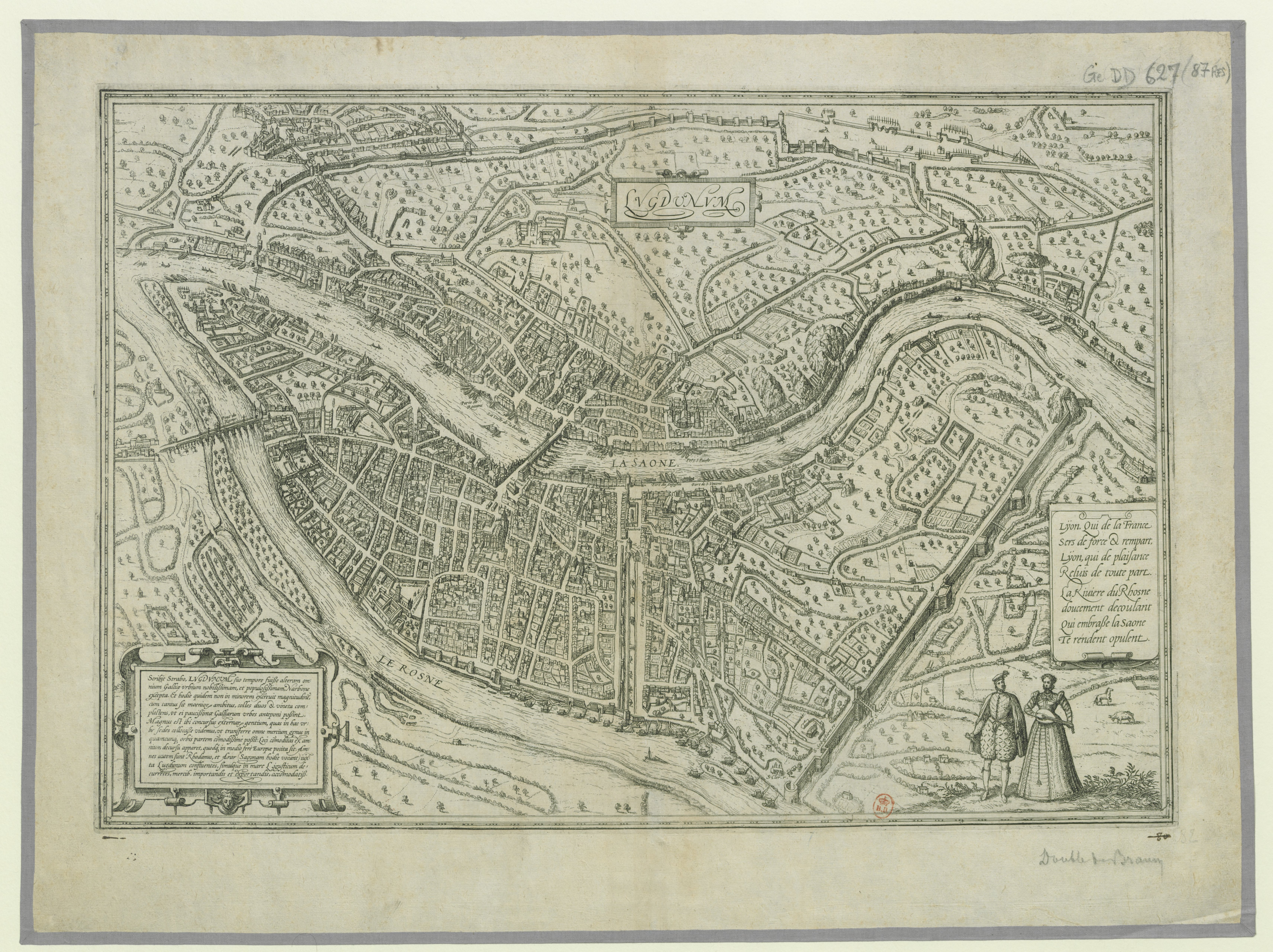
Plan of Lyon in 1572. Engraving by Georg Braun, National Library of France.

By the late 15th century, the densest areas were the Saône's right bank and, on the Peninsula, a bourgeois urban core along the era's Rue Mercière (via mercatoria), spanning from Saône to Rhône bridge. Corporations, trades, and foreign nations clustered tightly in neighborhoods or streets, reflecting Lyon's strong social organization.

===== Saint-Georges, Saint-Jean, and the Roanne palace neighborhood =====
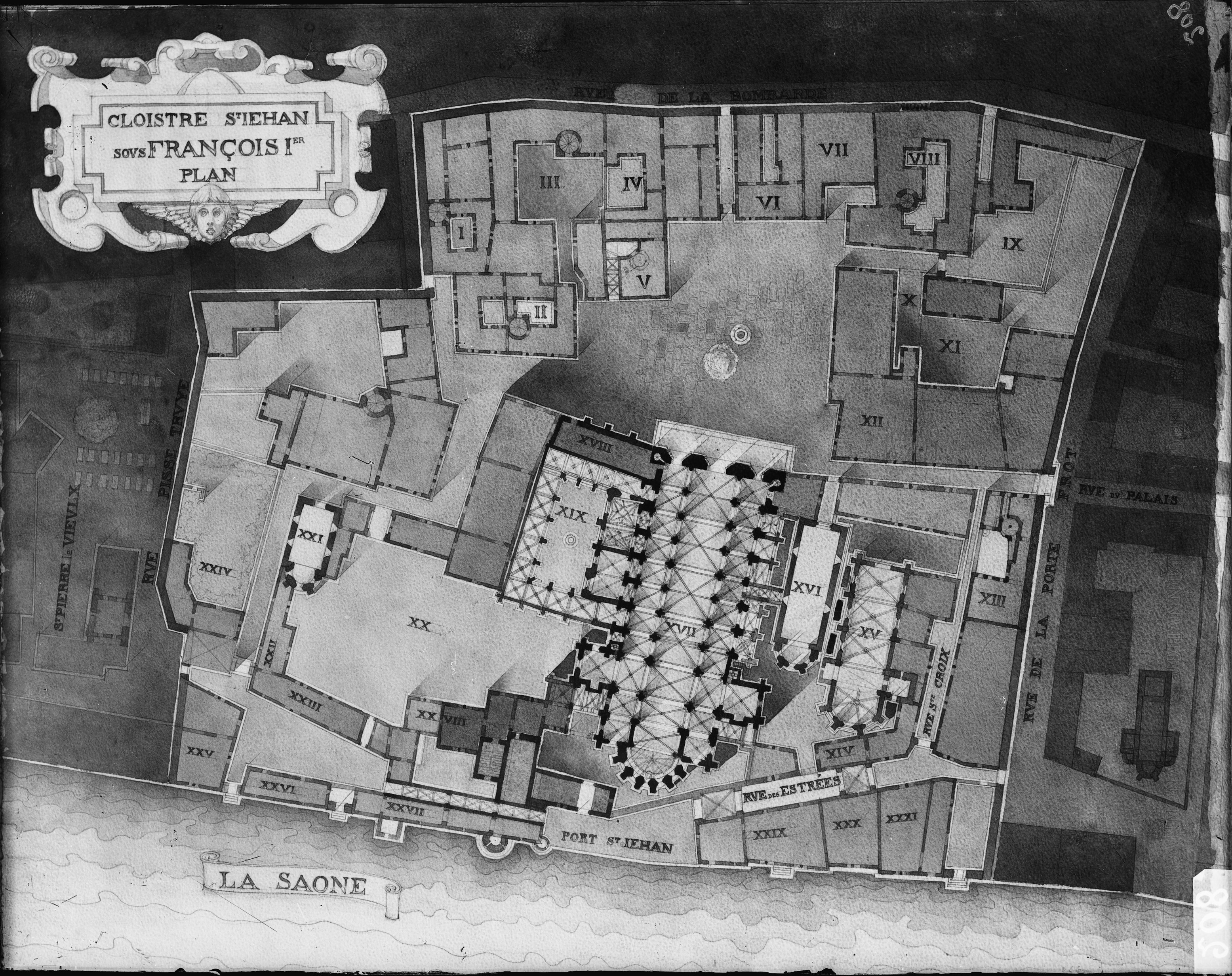
Plan of the Lyon cathedral group during the Renaissance. Engraving from Histoire des églises et chapelles de Lyon by Jean-Baptiste Martin, 1908.

Fourvière's lower slopes were narrow, topography-constrained. Main streets ran parallel to the river, with limited cross-ways. Upper slopes were nearly uninhabited, covered in woods, gardens, and vines.

Saint-Georges was a poor Renaissance neighborhood of affaneurs, fishermen, masons, weavers, and boat builders. Yet it housed the wealthy Bellièvre family and the Order of Saint John of Jerusalem commandery.

The Roanne hôtel, (Note: Also Palais de Roanne; named for 12th-century owner, canon Heraclius de Roanne. Occupies the northern half of the current courthouse.) seneschalsy seat since 1435, populated surrounding streets with royal officials. During the Italian Wars, it hosted the king and court. Along Rue du Palais, early Renaissance residents formed a solid middle bourgeoisie of merciers, furriers, apothecaries, notaries, changers, and lawyers. As royal influence grew via Roanne, poorer inhabitants shifted south toward Saint-Jean and Saint-Georges. In 1538, with Francis I's approval, the consulate demolished Roanne's enclosure for a square bearing its name.

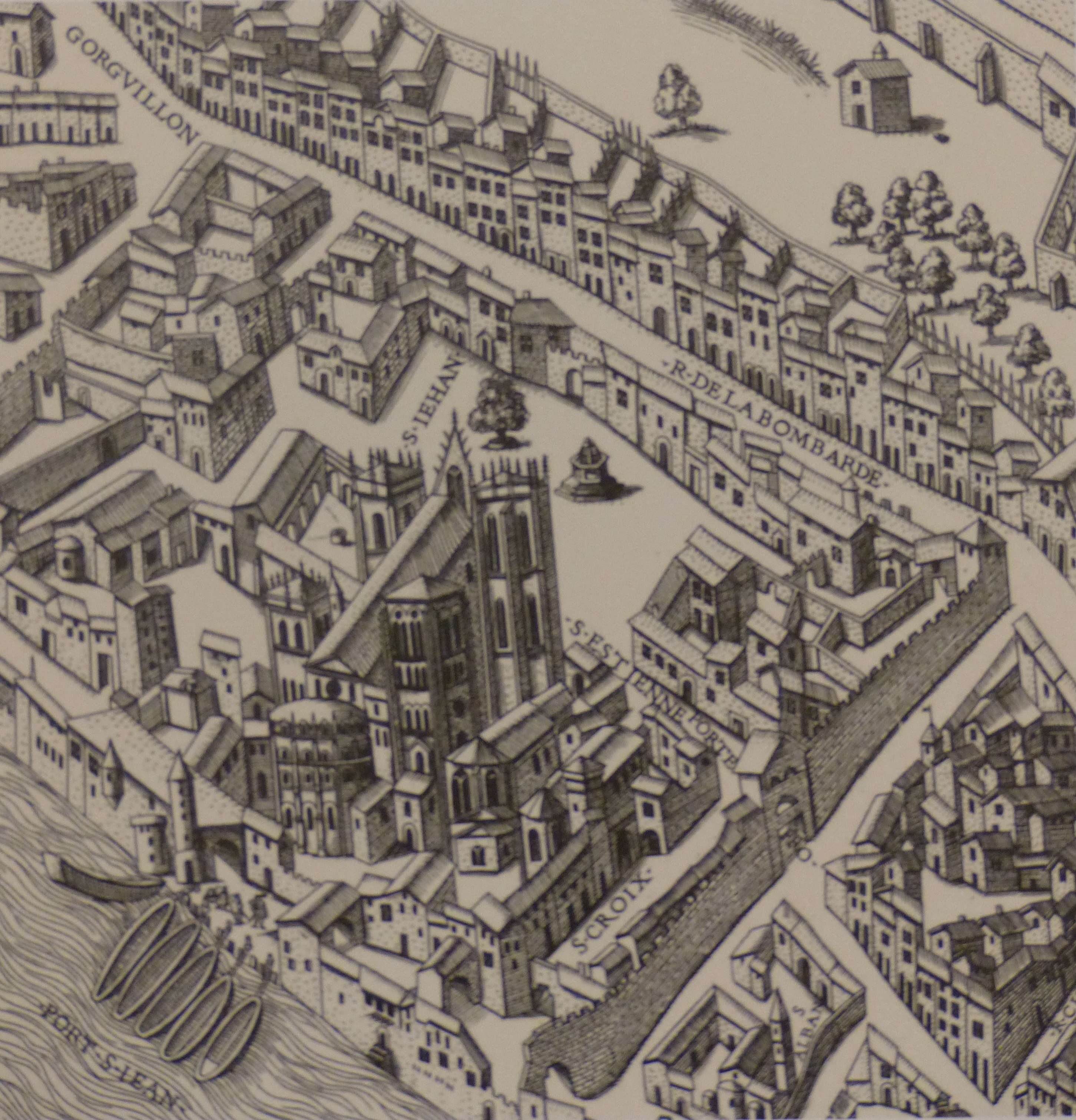
Cathedral group on 1550 plan. Lyon Municipal Archives.

Poor folk—affaneurs, fishermen, boat builders—clustered around the canonical quarter along Rue de la Bombarde, Rue Tramassac, and Gourguillon. This canonical quarter bisected the Saône's right bank; bypassing its wall required Rue de la Bombarde to Rue Tramassac. The cloister had gates: one to Roanne palace, Porte Froc (Note: Or Porte Frau.) to Rue Saint-Jean, (Note: Then Rue du Palais.) another to Rue Tramassac, and one south to Saint-Pierre-le-Vieux Church. The latter, a parish church, featured chapels maintained by Lyonnais bourgeoisie for burials, including Bellièvre, Bullioud, and Laurencin.

In the Renaissance, as Louis XI seized Pierre Scize castle, Archbishop Charles de Bourbon reoccupied the intra-muros palace. He extensively renovated it around 1466 to modernize it, though he resided little in Lyon. This era also saw the completion of Saint-Jean Cathedral with lateral chapels.

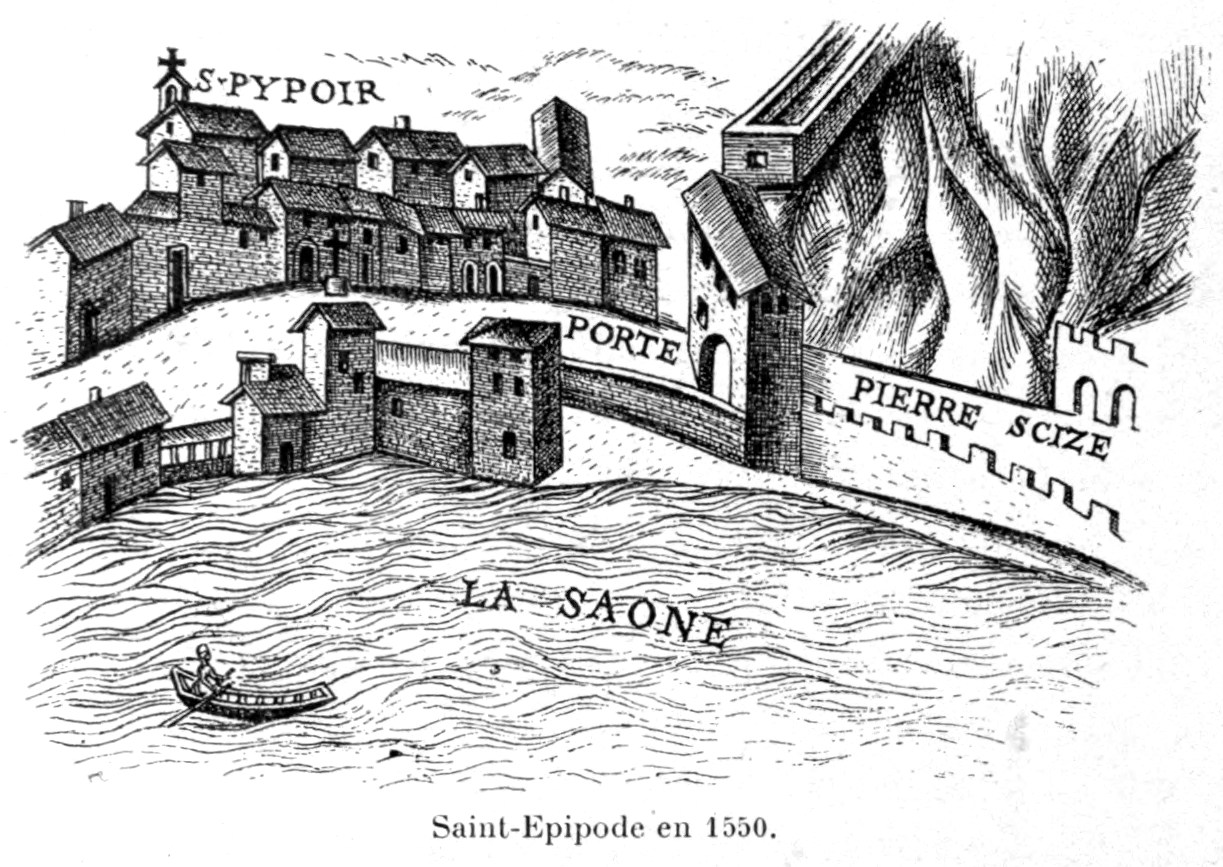
Lyon's north gate and Saint-Épipode Church. Engraving from Histoire des églises et chapelles de Lyon by Jean-Baptiste Martin, 1908.

===== Saint-Paul, Pierre-Scize, and Bourgneuf =====
Between Saint-Paul and Saint-Christophe, (Note: Current Place du Gouvernement.) armorers, printers, and booksellers thrived. Southern Saint-Paul square hosted many changers, goldsmiths, and merchants of Piedmontese, Florentine, or Spanish origin. This neighborhood's population, poor after the Hundred Years' War, grew wealthier during the 15th century, with menial activities largely disappearing.

Between Rue Juiverie, Place du Change, and Notre-Dame du Palais lay the core of Lyonnais banking and a major commercial center led by Italians and housing clerks from across Europe. In the mid-15th century these streets still housed commoners, who were gradually displaced. Rue Juiverie, for example, initially described as poor and "wide, poorly peopled with Jews and poor folk," became occupied by Italian merchant-bankers who built large houses, turning it into "one of the city's finest" streets.

Pierre-Scize and Bourgneuf (Note: At current Pierre-Scize.) long specialized in textile activities and remained relatively poor. In 1561 the consulate razed a gate, four houses, and a tower to create Place de Bourgneuf. (Note: Current Place de l'Homme de la Roche.)

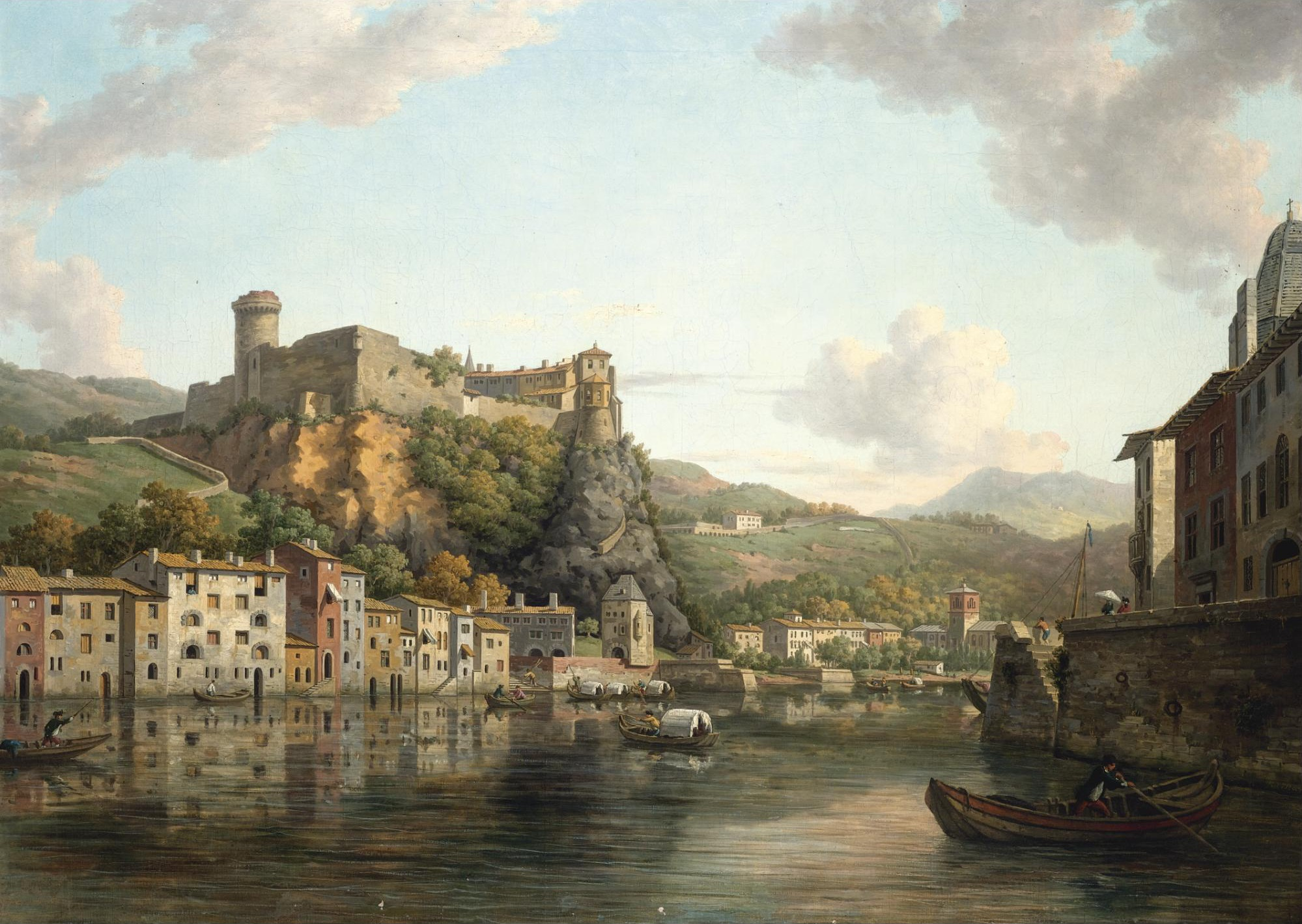
View of Pierre-Scize castle in the 18th century, by William Marlow; National Galleries of Scotland, Acc. No. NG 431.

===== Fourvière plateau, Saint-Just, and Pierre-Scize =====
Fourvière plateau was sparsely populated, mostly rural. Hill slopes developed only along ascending roads like Montée du Gourguillon or the newly created Chemin-Neuf. Southward, Saint-Just—juridically separate from Lyon and controlled by the canons—was walled off from the agglomeration. Proximity nevertheless integrated it urbanistically; for example, Saint-Paul's cattle market was relocated there. The separation ended under Protestant rule, when Huguenot authorities demolished the cloister walls. Northward, the archbishop's former castle of Pierre Scize, now owned by the king and administered by the governor, overlooked the city.

===== Peninsula: Bellecour to Saint-Vincent slopes =====
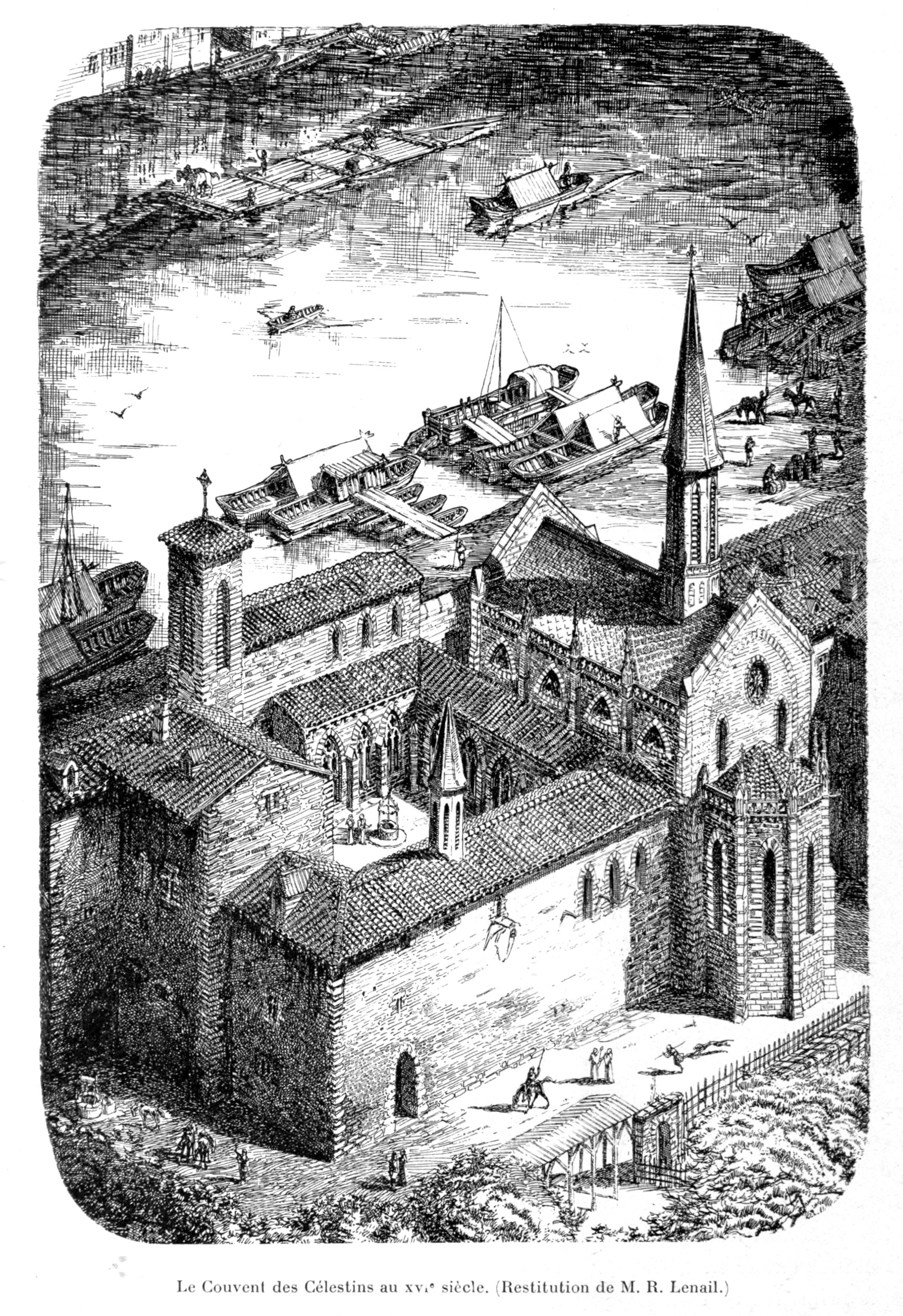
Célestins convent, 19th-century reconstruction. Engraving from Histoire des églises et chapelles de Lyon by Jean-Baptiste Martin, 1908.

Empire-side (Note: In the Middle Ages, the France-Empire border ran through the Saône until Philip the Fair's 14th-century attachment. Tradition persists: west Saône as Kingdom, east as Empire.) urbanism was more fragmented than Kingdom-side, due to recent urbanization. It comprised three 9th-century vici: northern Saint-Vincent, central old borough (around Saint-Nizier), southern Bourg Chanin.

Saint-Nizier was this side's commercial hub, facing the Change. Centered on Saint-Nizier Church, completed late 16th century. Surrounding streets housed furriers, merciers, drapers, merchants, and notaries on Rues Vendrant, Longue, and Rue Mercière. Bourgeois families such as Humbert, Aynard de Varey, and Humbert de Villeneuve resided there; Rue Mercière alone was home to Le Maistre, Syvrieu, and Thomassin. In the late 15th and early 16th centuries the area specialised in cloth and fur trade and parchment-making; printers became prominent later. The bourgeoisie merged with the nobility through lordships or royal service and included many Milanese and German residents.

Peripheral streets housed better-off artisans and commoners who benefited from the fairs. Rues de la Pêcherie and de l'Erberie—occupied by fish handlers and sellers—were no longer poor districts.

Farther out, toward the Rhône or down to Bellecour, living conditions remained modest.

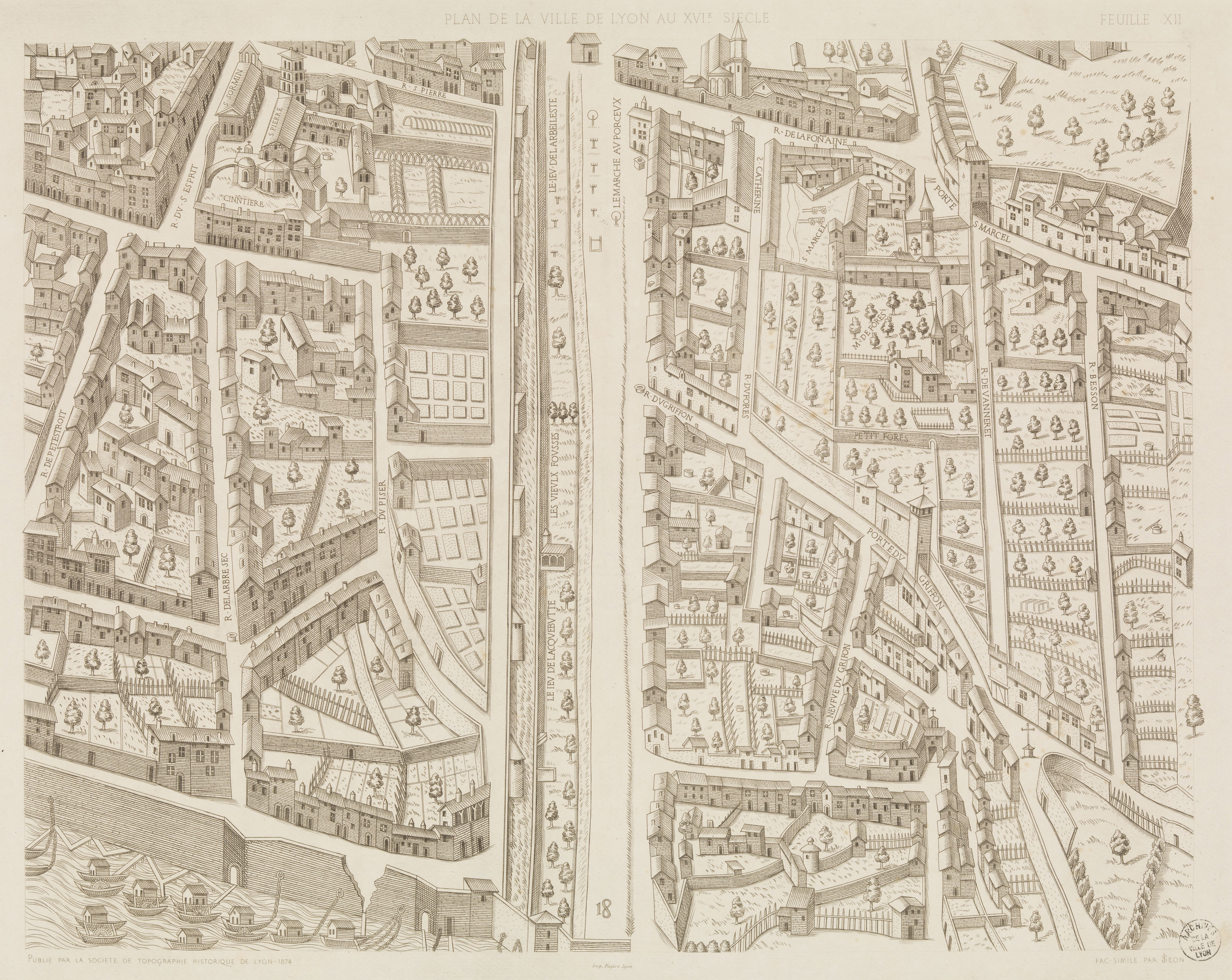
Scenographic Lyon plan; Terreaux fortification view with Saint-Pierre abbey. Lyon Municipal Archives.

The current Croix-Rousse slopes, then called Saint-Vincent, were sparsely populated but gradually densified, as did the left bank of the Rhône. Houses were built along the Terreaux fortifications, and the Déserte neighborhood formed at their base. For protection, Louis XII ordered an uphill rampart in 1512; the plans and works were directed by Jean Perréal.

===== Peninsula: Bellecour to Ainay =====
South of Bellecour, especially from Ainay Basilica, the area consisted mainly of meadows, orchards, marshes, and islands. Convents owned large agricultural domains there. Renaissance-era urbanization largely bypassed this zone. The 270-meter stone bridge over the Rhône, originally half stone and half wood, was rebuilt entirely in stone between 1559 and 1560 after several collapses.

=== Demography and immigration ===
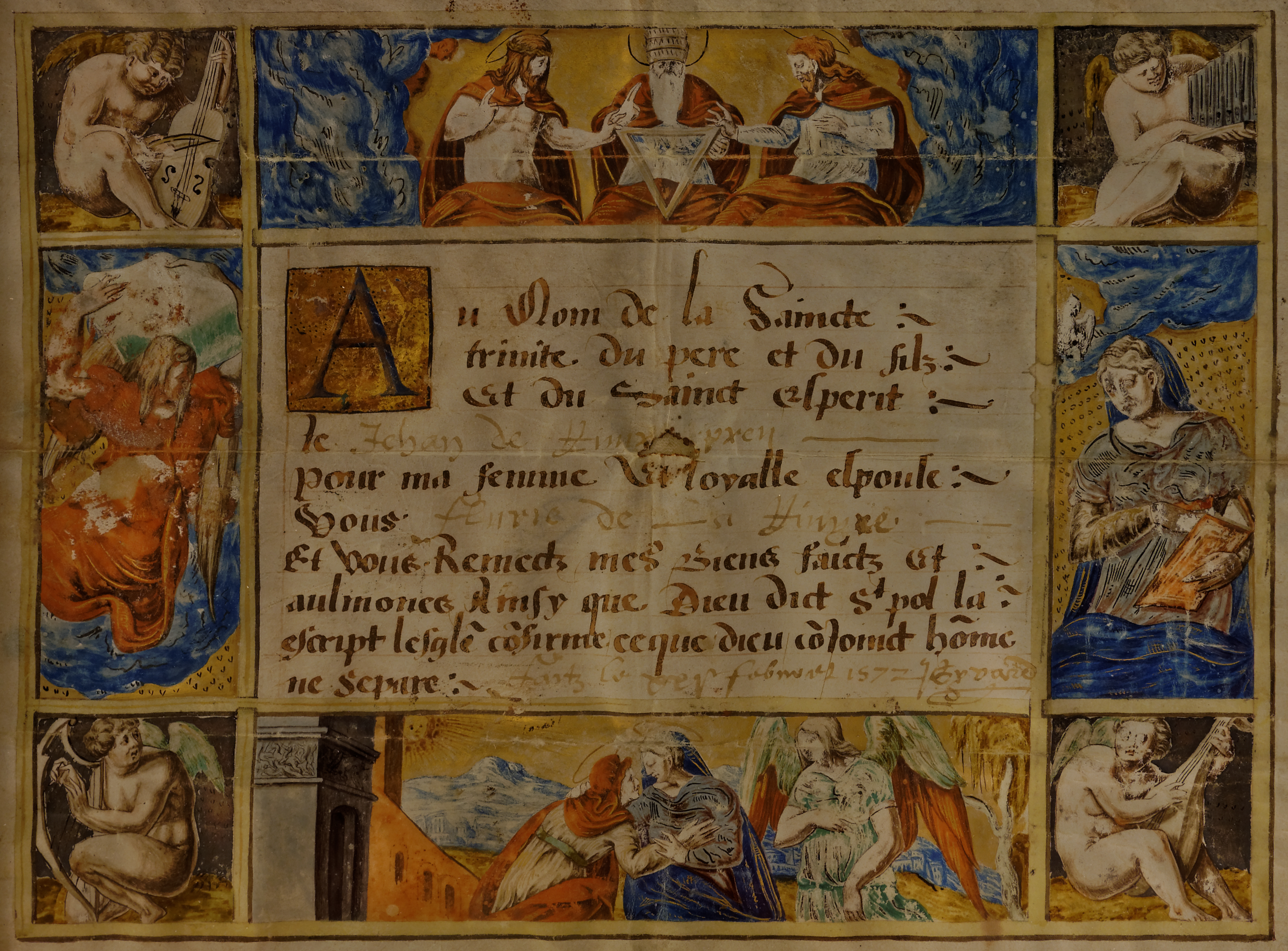
Marriage charter of Jehan de Rivery and Fluvie de la Rivyre - 1572. Parchment illumination. Lyon, Gadagne Museums, Inv. 37.65.

Accurate population estimates are challenging without censuses. Richard Gascon used tax rolls and house levies to discern trends: population doubled from 1450 to 1500, then doubled again in the early 16th century. This mirrored France's urban growth, with 10–100% increases from late 15th to mid-16th century. From the 1430s–1440s low, Lyon's population grew steadily. Kleinclausz estimated 25,000 mid-century. Growth accelerated to ~35,000 by 1520 and 50,000–60,000 (or 75,000) mid-century. This increase was primarily driven by immigration from Savoy, Dauphiné, and Burgundy.

The consulate faced difficulties meeting the food requirements created by this growth. Local production proved insufficient, leading to increased imports from Burgundy—one of the causes of the 1529's Grande Rebeyne. Epidemics of plague periodically reduced the population, but immigration rapidly restored numbers. The Wars of Religion caused a marked decline; Zeller estimated 30,000–35,000 inhabitants by the late 16th century.

While Renaissance Lyon was cosmopolitan, most foreigners were transient or short-term residents. Few non-French speakers settled permanently. In the mid-16th century the majority of migrants who married and settled came from Savoy, the County of Burgundy, and Dauphiné; smaller numbers originated in the Lyonnais, nearby Auvergne, or other parts of France; approximately 5% were non-French speakers.

=== Institutions ===
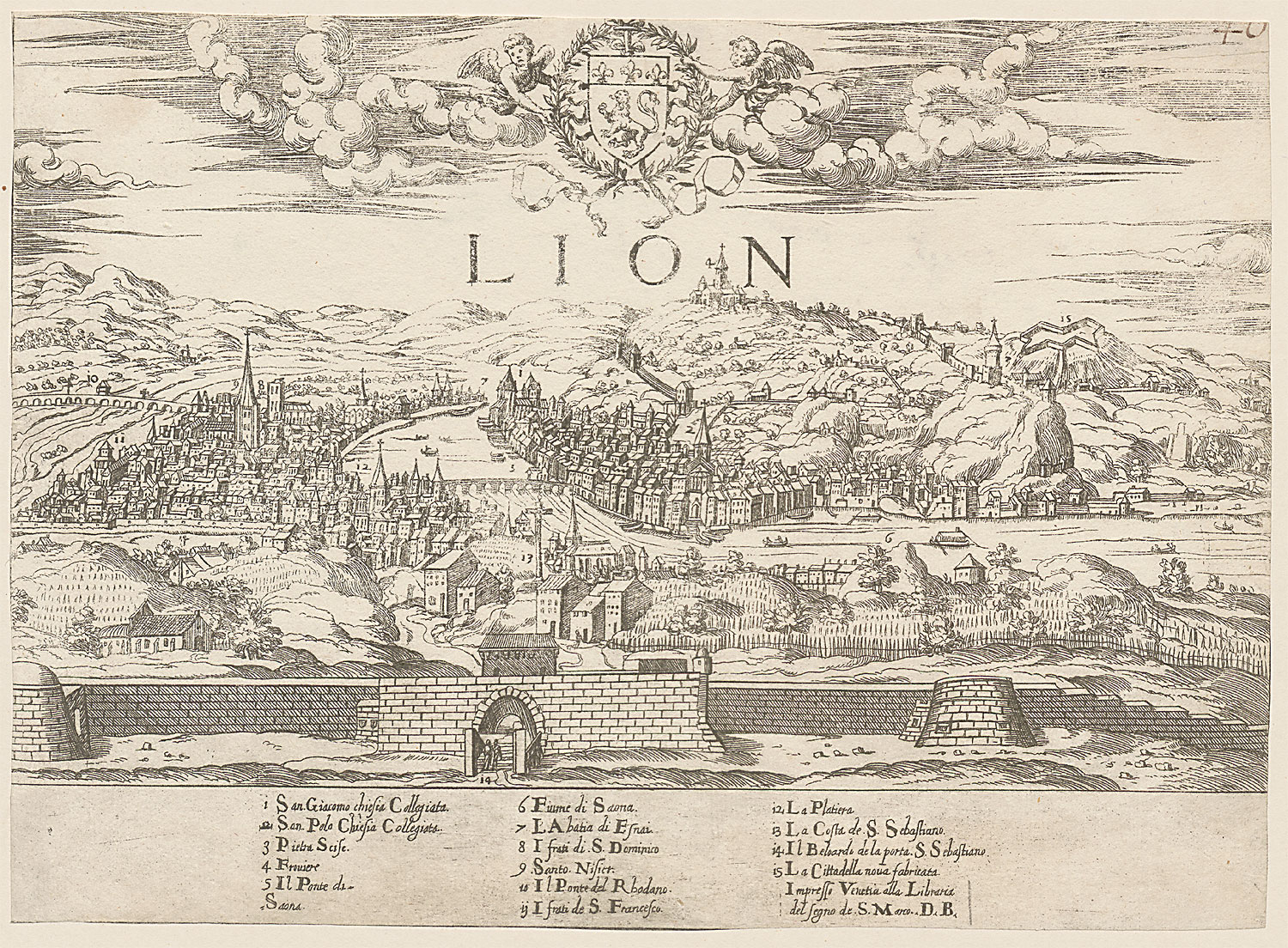
Lyon c. 1570, anonymous engraving, Salzburg University Library.

Renaissance Lyon's institutions—civil, military, judicial, religious—overlapped, intermingled, clashed, or opposed each other, often without clear boundaries. The central institution was the consulate, which managed relations with subordinate civil bodies such as the General Alms, the Pennons, and confraternities, as well as with royal authority. Judicial authority initially lay with ecclesiastical courts before gradually passing to royal jurisdiction. Royal power was strongly represented through the governor and the bureau of finances. Foreign merchants exercised influence through formally recognized "Nations" that handled their grievances and defense.

==== The consulate ====
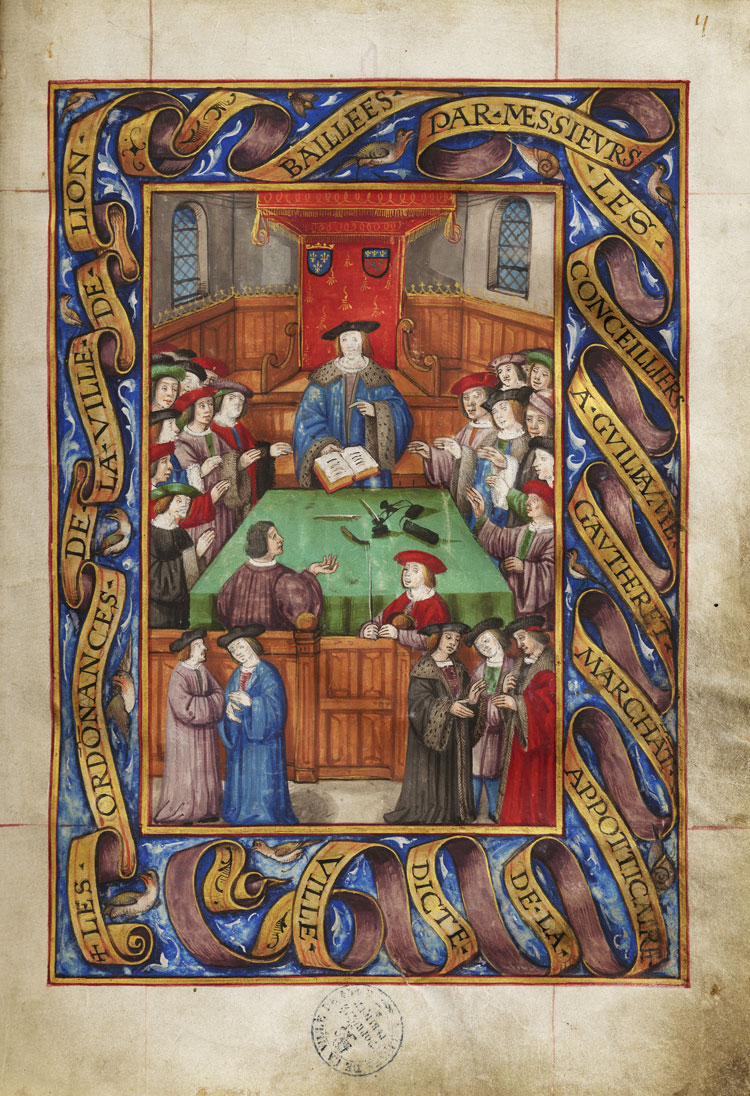
Miniature from 1519's Garbeau de l'Épicerie manuscript depicting the consulate assembly granting spice tax receiver role to apothecary Guillaume Gautheret. Lyon Municipal Archives (CC 4292).

Lyon's consulate comprised wealthy merchants from leading families. Charles VIII granted nobility privilege to consuls in 1495. Consuls' sociological origins evolved: late 15th-century law-men (tied to royal roles) dominated; merchant families rose with prosperity, reducing office-holders to a quarter by 1520–1530, under a fifth 1540–1550, rebounding to majority under Henry IV. Regardless, limited lineages dominated: Regnault, Faure, Henry, Fenoyl, La Porte, ~15 others. Despite biennial renewal, continuity prevailed.

Twelve-consul renewal: annual halving in December. Incumbents selected two trade masters per guild; assembly elected six notables joining prior six. Cooptation excluded clergy, nobles, commoners.

===== Consular powers =====
Limited by royal and local powers, the consulate nevertheless possessed substantial authority: it appointed trade and terrier masters (often former échevins or provosts), convened notables, selected city officers, designated deputies to the Estates General or court, and recruited clerks. In policing it appointed pennon captains and could imprison or exile offenders.

On economic matters it controlled 51 trades, recorded their regulations, and appointed masters. It taxed goods entering the city, ensured conformity of weights and measures, and maintained roads to facilitate circulation.

===== Administrative personnel =====
The administrative staff grew and became more specialized. From 1506 legal acts were handled by a general prosecutor (a law graduate). Financial administration (goods duties, octrois, donations, taxes): a treasurer and general receiver existed from the late 14th century; the latter became the "receiver of common deniers" in 1543.

==== The municipal militia ====
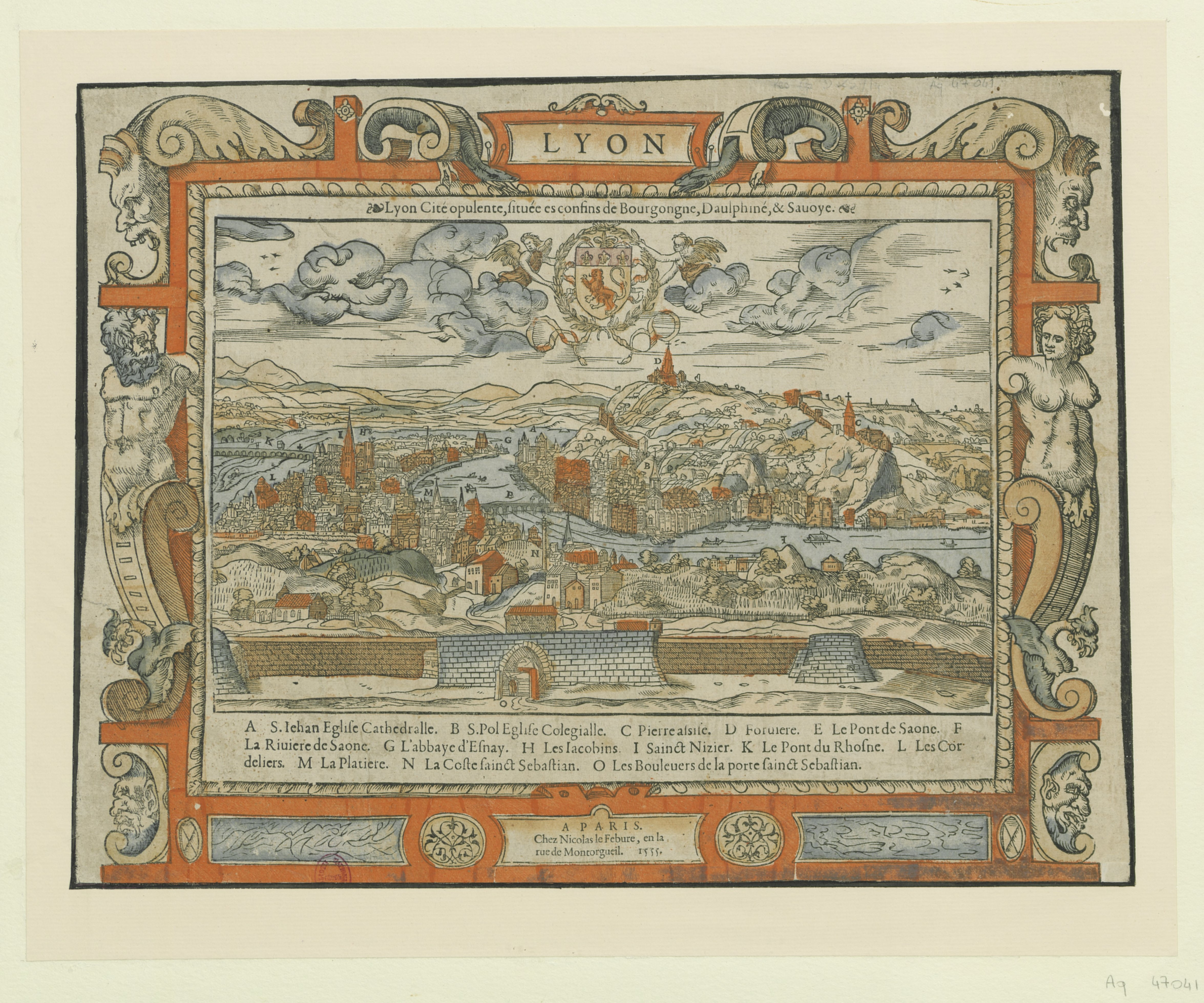
Lyon view, 1555, Nicolas Le Febvre, BNF.

The municipal militia consisted of all able-bodied adult males organized by neighborhood, supplemented by professionals paid by the consulate. It was divided into seven banners and approximately thirty pennons, each subdivided into groups of about ten men commanded by dizeniers. Ordinary citizens performed rampart watch duties, while paid professionals guarded the city and its gates; the bourgeois elite served mounted and within the city walls.

===== Lyon's royal companies =====
In 1430 the bourgeois militia company distinguished itself at the Battle of Anthon against the Prince of Orange. In 1431 Charles VII elevated the Lyonnais archers to the status of a Royal Company. Placed under the patronage of Saint Sebastian, it used the Saint-Germain chapel in Saint-Nizier church from 1486. Statutes of 1498 established a second company. Training initially took place in the Rue Grôlée and Rue de l'Hôpital; from 1513 it moved to the mound of the Auges owned by the company, between the Rues des Augustins and Place Sathonay. The companies' role declined after the creation in 1498 of a company of culveriniers and arquebusiers; the original royal companies were dissolved in 1591. From 1561 the arquebusiers provided the city guard, consisting of 200 men under a captain appointed by the consulate.

==== Confraternities ====
From the early 14th century territorial confraternities dedicated to the Holy Spirit served as intermediaries between the population and the consulate. Grouped under the Trinity confraternity, these societates or frairies organized neighborhoods through festivals, rituals, and the election of couriers, and the management of hospital, funeral, and festive functions. Usually socially and geographically homogeneous, they contributed to social regulation.

Their principal rivals were the professional confraternities. By 1530 two-thirds of the forty-eight officially recognized confraternities were professional. Organized by trade networks rather than territory, they were difficult to locate spatially except for their spiritual seats in churches. These newer, protective associations paraded with banners and performed displays of strength, provoking outbreaks of violence that the authorities deplored but proved unable to suppress.

==== Hospital and assistance institutions ====
During the Renaissance Lyon possessed numerous shelters for the sick and poor. Most were linked to ecclesiastical institutions and supported by donors; over time they came increasingly under consulate control, culminating in the creation of the General Alms in 1534.

===== General Alms =====
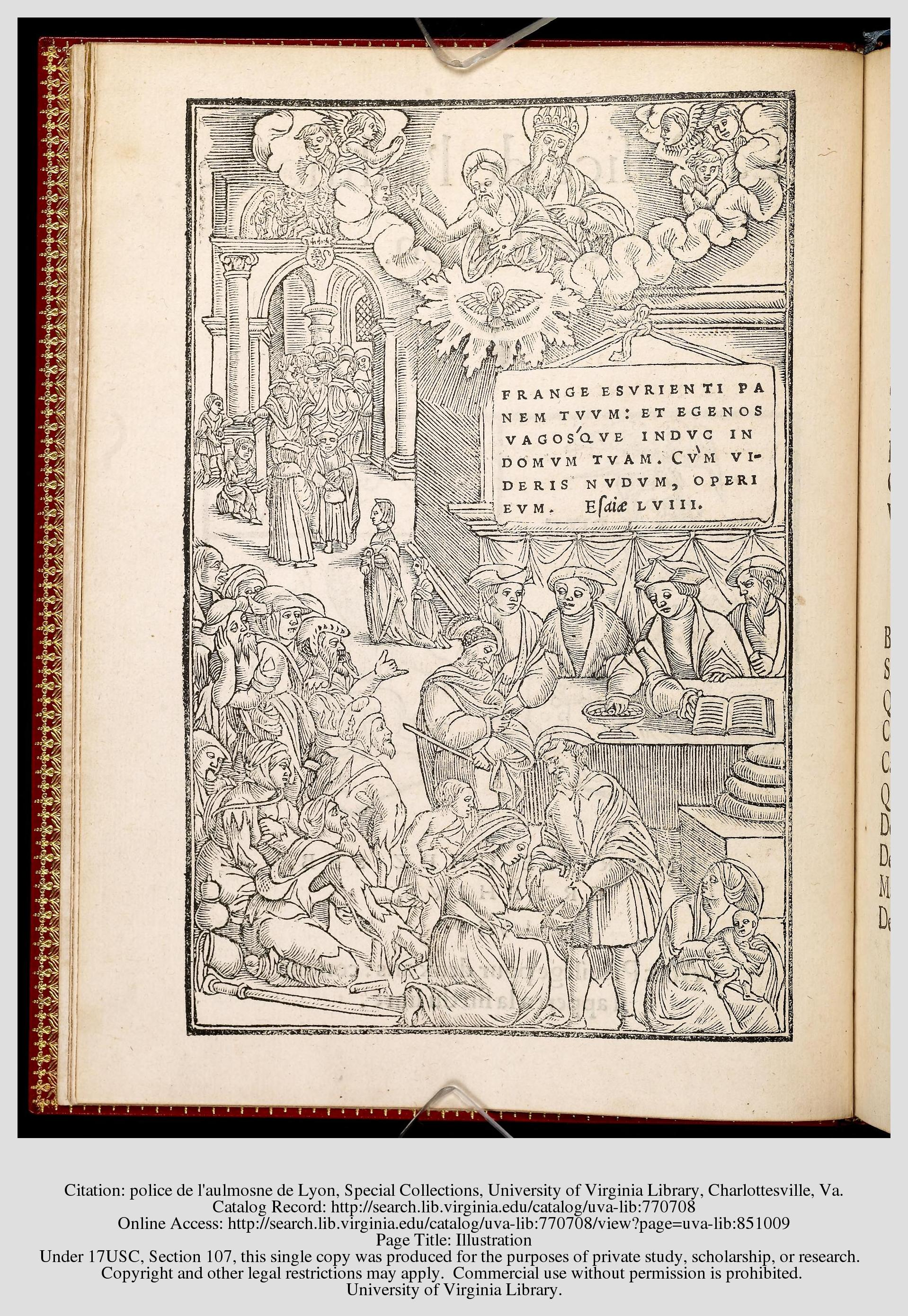
Frontispiece, La police de l'aulmosne de Lyon, Sébastien Gryphe, 1539. University of Virginia.

Population growth greatly increased the number of poor and needy, overwhelming traditional ecclesiastical charity. The consulate established public assistance to cope with the influx and to aid impoverished residents of Lyon. As in Paris, Rouen, and Dijon, rising food prices pushed many workers into poverty, and the desire to maintain charity and social peace prompted organized relief. The 1529 rebeyne and the 1539 printers' strike encouraged the elite to act.

The General Alms was instituted in 1534, following a decision taken after the famine of 1531. Financed by contributions from the bourgeoisie and administered by eight or nine rectors chosen from the consuls, it primarily subsidized bread. Members sometimes advanced funds at personal risk but thereby gained priority for the office of échevin.

The Alms' primary task was assistance: it owned a mill and bakery and, in times of famine, distributed bread to all the poor; in normal periods only to invalids, the sick, widows, and orphans. A secondary aim was to provide work: children were apprenticed to drapers or placed as domestics in notables' households, while adults were employed cleaning ditches and streets. Able-bodied beggars frequently resisted forced labor and were sometimes had to be chained or imprisoned for refusal. Police functions became linked to assistance: beadles known as chasse-coquins were appointed to drive away outsiders attracted by the distributions. The coercive aspect of the system produced mixed feelings among recipients.

The institution was created earlier than similar bodies elsewhere in France and fitted the broader European trend toward secular and professionalized poor relief. It reflected a changing Western perception of poverty: from the deserving needy to the able-bodied unemployed whose control was necessary for public order. Humanist thought regarded extreme poverty as reducing people to an animal state.

In 1560 the General Alms became an independent body, a status formalized by letters patent of Charles IX. Rectors were chosen by cooptation, subject to ratification or nomination by the consulate, which retained control over major decisions.

===== Hospitals =====
Institutions varied in longevity; some endured for centuries, while others ceased operation shortly after their foundation. A precise list is difficult to establish, as the sources are partial, indirect, or imprecise.

Notable examples included:

- The oldest on the Peninsula was the "Rhône Bridge hospital." This medieval "Holy Spirit Almonry," also known as the "poor hospital" or "Alms house," was founded in 1129 by the Holy Spirit confraternity. In 1335 it passed to the Chassagne abbots and was renamed. By 1478 it had been transferred to the consulate. It was located south of the Bourgchanin, near the river.
- On the Mercière-Saône side was the "Saint-Antoine hospital," prominent in the 15th century. The Sainte-Catherine hospital (on the current Rue d'Algérie) was dependent on the dames of Saint-Pierre and received many bequests. There was also a modest "widows' hospital" or Hôtel-Dieu des femmes: mainly for plague victims, on the Mercière, Rues Raisin-Thomassin.
- On the right bank of the Saône were several ancient institutions associated with the parishes of Saint-Georges and Saint-Paul.
- The latter included the "Two-Lovers hospital" (at the end of Rue Bourgneuf), which replaced "la Chana"; and the "Saint-Eloi hospital" near the church, which disappeared in 1503 following a suit between the chapter and the consulate.
- Saint-Georges had the hospital of the Knights Hospitaller ("Saint John of Jerusalem hospitaliers") for pilgrims. Near Sainte-Marie was a small hospital of the same name. Both were minimally active. In 1474 Jacques Caille and Huguette Balarin founded the "Saint-Laurent hospital" for plague victims, acquiring the Saint-Laurent des vignes chapel of the Saint-Irénée chapter and adjoining buildings, below the parish. It developed and passed to the consulate. The church was undersized; the Trinity confraternity enlarged it in 1509. In 1533 Thomas II de Gadagne, via the Dominican Sante Pagnini, commissioned Salvator Salvatori for a third building.

All were small, with few beds; they mainly served as points for distributing food to the poor. The managing religious orders were often underfunded and relied on lands and legacies; they frequently had to beg to supplement their income.

===== Leper houses =====
In the 15th century there were four external houses for plague victims and the sick, banished out of fear of contagion. Near Saint-Irénée: Griffon; Saint-Foy: Saint-Martin; Vaise: Saint-Pierre/Balmont; opposite the Rhône bridge (replacing Béchevelin): Sainte-Madeleine.

==== Justice ====
Philip V's 1320 decision vested secular justice solely in the archbishop. This was gradually eroded by the king's bailiff, preferred by bourgeois escaping local ecclesiastical sway. Francis I fully assumed control in 1531; Henry II returned it in 1547. The 1562 Protestant seizure allowed the king to illegally seize all judicial powers, with the archbishop absent. This became permanent. Post-dating ecclesiastical seigneurial powers: the archbishop's Pierre Scize castle, cathedral chapter's Saint-Jean cloister. The consulate was never granted judicial powers by the king. Justice for the fairs, from their origins, fell to the king's conservator/guardian. Bourgeois gained arbitrators for fair disputes before royal appeal. This was a precursor to commercial tribunals; in Rouen and Toulouse, it was copied in the Paris royal edict of 1536.

==== The governor ====
Capetian-created provincial governments administered military affairs in the king's absence, mainly for territorial defense. The Lyonnais governor controlled the current Rhône/Loire, plus parts of Velay and Dombes. He oversaw three: Lyonnais county, Beaujolais lordship, Forez county. Post-bailiff/seneschal; predecessors faded. First: Tanneguy IV du Chastel 1462–1468 succeeding seneschals. Broad royal delegation: vice-roy provincial, lieutenant general title.

France and neighbors, 1477.

===== Functions and powers =====
The main military responsibility was command of provincial troops; this role diminished as borders shifted. The governor retained authority over strongholds, fortifications, munitions, and troops. A key duty was the discipline of armed men—garrisons were billeted on civilians and often committed exactions. He was also responsible for public order and calm; civil powers grew in response to disturbances such as brawls or revolts. He dealt with general crises (famines and epidemics) and specific matters (roads, circulation, and food regulation). He mobilized both royal and municipal forces, including the militia, and could raise the ban and arrière-ban.

===== Position and support =====
The office was usually held by members of the high nobility who were loyal to the king and battle-hardened. The role was multifunctional and required frequent missions; a lieutenant was appointed to act in the governor's absence.

===== Renaissance role =====
During the Renaissance Lyon lay near several threats: Savoy's holdings in Bresse, Bugey, and Gex, with their ambiguous policy; Burgundy, the enemy during the Hundred Years' War and occupied in the Mâconnais by Charles the Bold; and the Habsburg Franche-Comté bordering the Holy Roman Empire.

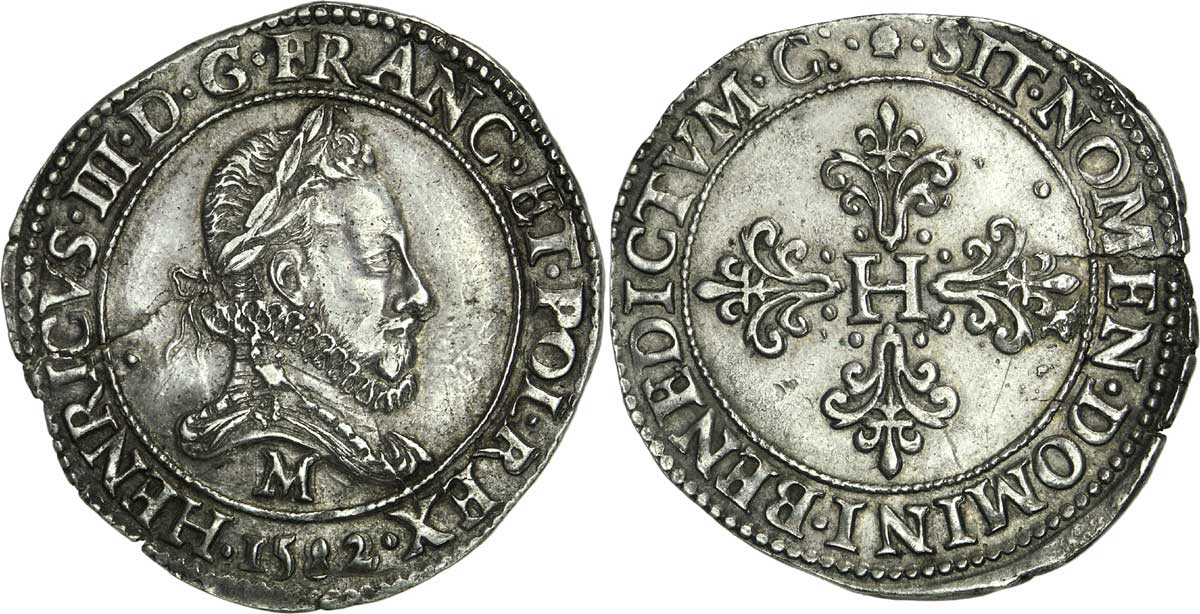
Henry III's franc, finance bureaus creator. 1582.

==== Foreign nations ====
Renaissance Lyon attracted large foreign communities of artisans, merchants, and bankers. By the early 16th century they were so numerous that native Lyonnais regarded the city as cosmopolitan, as noted by Symphorien Champier: "Where dwell folk of all nations, as Italians, Florentines, Genoese, Lucchese, Allobroges, Germans, Spaniards and others."

Sufficiently large and structured groups formed "nations." Their influx was encouraged by letters patent of Charles VII in 1420 (later renewed), which granted tax exemptions to French and foreign merchants. They organized and regulated their members and represented them to local authorities, the consulate, the king, or their places of origin. The nations were regular interlocutors of the consulate and staunchly defended their privileges. Their representatives participated in solemnities, especially royal and grand entries. Confident in their wealth and power, they displayed their fortune through rich equipages and clothing of silk, velvet, and silver. As one visitor observed: "By commerce, men, women, aspect, this city echoes beautiful Italy, making it France's fairest." The Italians constituted the most numerous and important nations from the origins of the fairs to the end of the Renaissance. They originated mainly from Florence, Milan, Genoa, and Lucca, with smaller numbers from Bologna and Venice.

Florentine Republic coat of arms.

===== Florentine nation =====
The wealthiest and most numerous of the Lyonnais nations was the Florentine. Notable families included the Gadagne, the Medici, and the Capponi. Like great clans, they welcomed political exiles. They dominated for a century from the mid-15th to the mid-16th; thereafter they gradually withdrew, though retaining key posts such as Lyon customs.

They had an officially structured constitution, revised and approved by Florence. The first known version dated to 4 January 1477 (though an earlier one may have existed around 1447 in Geneva). It was reformed on 11 July 1501 to strengthen ties with the Florentine Republic. The leaders at this reform were Nicola del Bene, Thomas I de Gadagne, and Giovanni Vecchietti.

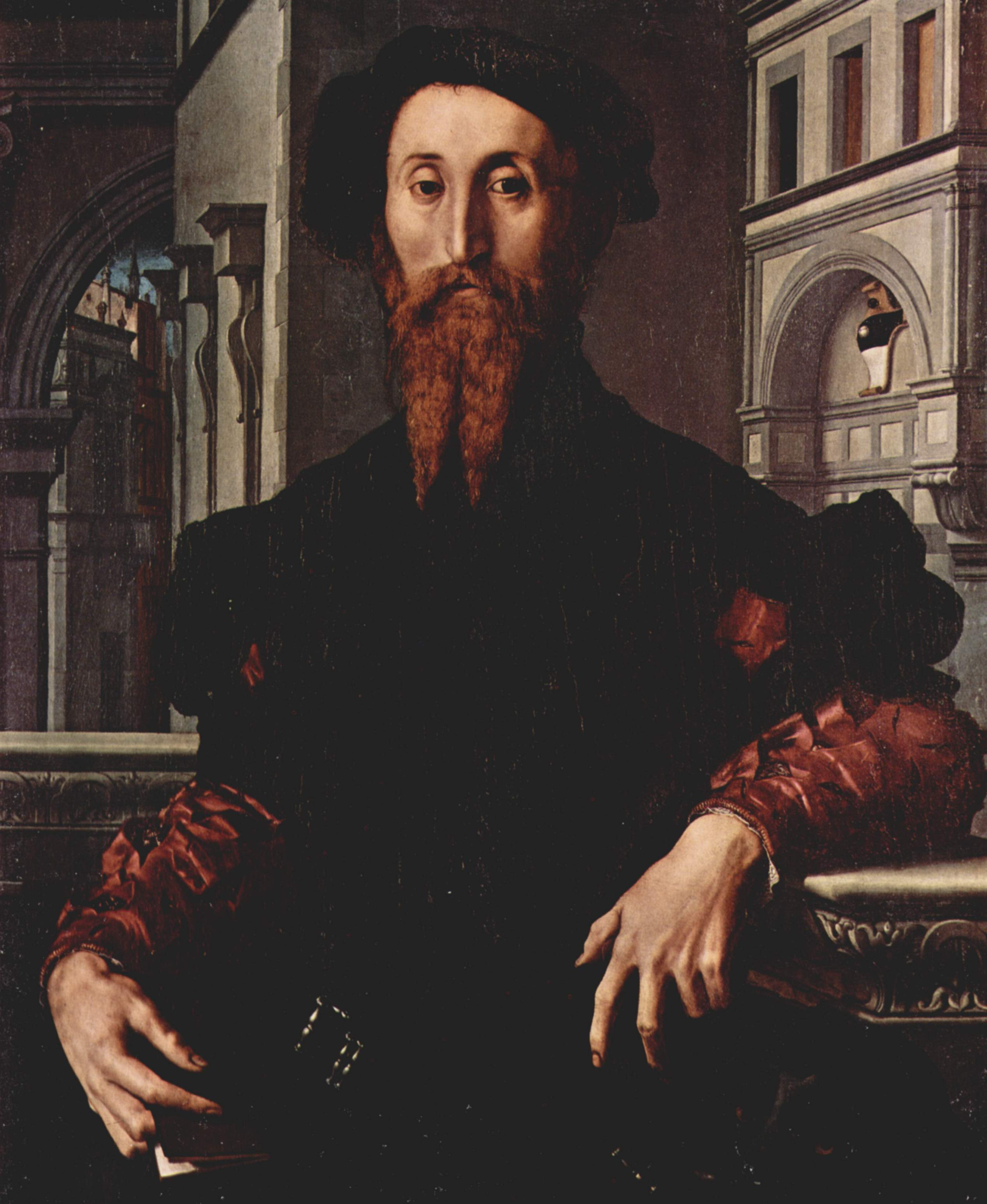
Bartolomeo Panciatichi by Agnolo Bronzino, c. 1540. Uffizi Gallery.

The leadership consisted of four counsellors and one consul. The consul directed payments at the closing of each of the four annual fairs. Internally, quarterly meetings defended Florentine privileges and freedom of commerce and ensured adherence to the law and avoidance of scandals. There were always five officers (replacements if absent). Meetings were held at the Saint-John-the-Baptist chapel in Notre-Dame-de-Confort Church.

Key consuls included the banker Nicolas del Bene in 1502, (Note: Uncle Albisse Del Bene, father Barthélémy Del Bene.) Thomas I de Gadagne in 1505, Jacopo Nardi in 1512, Leonardo Spina in 1541, Lorenzo Capponi in 1556, Francesco Capponi in 1570, Bernardo del Barbigia in 1579, Francesco Martelli in 1583, and Matteo Bartolomei in 1584. By the late 16th century their power waned and key families departed. Notre-Dame de Confort Church served Florentine worship from the earliest times. In 1464 they obtained burial privileges and funded its enlargement and embellishment.

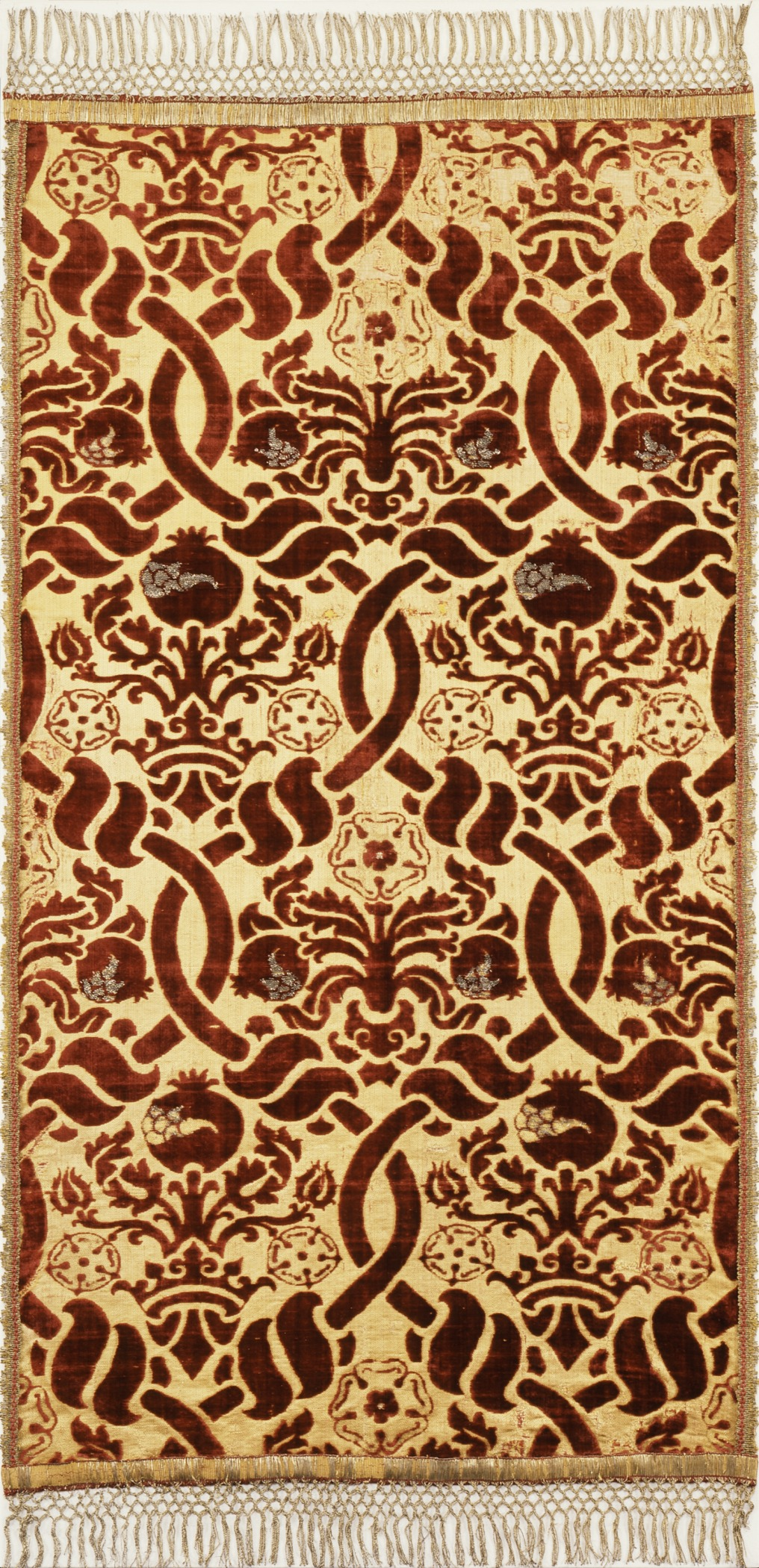
Early 16th-quarter Genoese-woven silk velvet. Los Angeles County Museum of Art.

===== Genoese nation =====
The Genoese nation was well-established, using elaborate legal structures that separated personal assets from those of the trading company. Companies were rarely familial and usually consisted of unions of several lineages. They were fewer than the Florentines but more numerous than the Lucchese. A tradition of mutual aid existed: Lucchese merchants often handled business for absent Genoese. They formed a formal nation with consuls, treasurers, and counsellors. Conflicts with Charles V exiled several families; some obtained French naturalization to settle permanently in Lyon.

Close ties existed between Genoese and Lyonnais merchants, with many Lyonnais firms active in Genoa. Political clashes led to periodic expulsions: the Genoese expelled subjects of the French king in 1496–1500, 1512–1515, and 1529–1535. Retaliatory expulsions occurred, but commercial exchanges continued. The main trade was in fabrics—Genoese velvets were sent to Lyon, while Lyonnais, English, and Flemish cloth was sought in Genoa. They also served first as intermediaries and later as manufacturers in the silk trade.

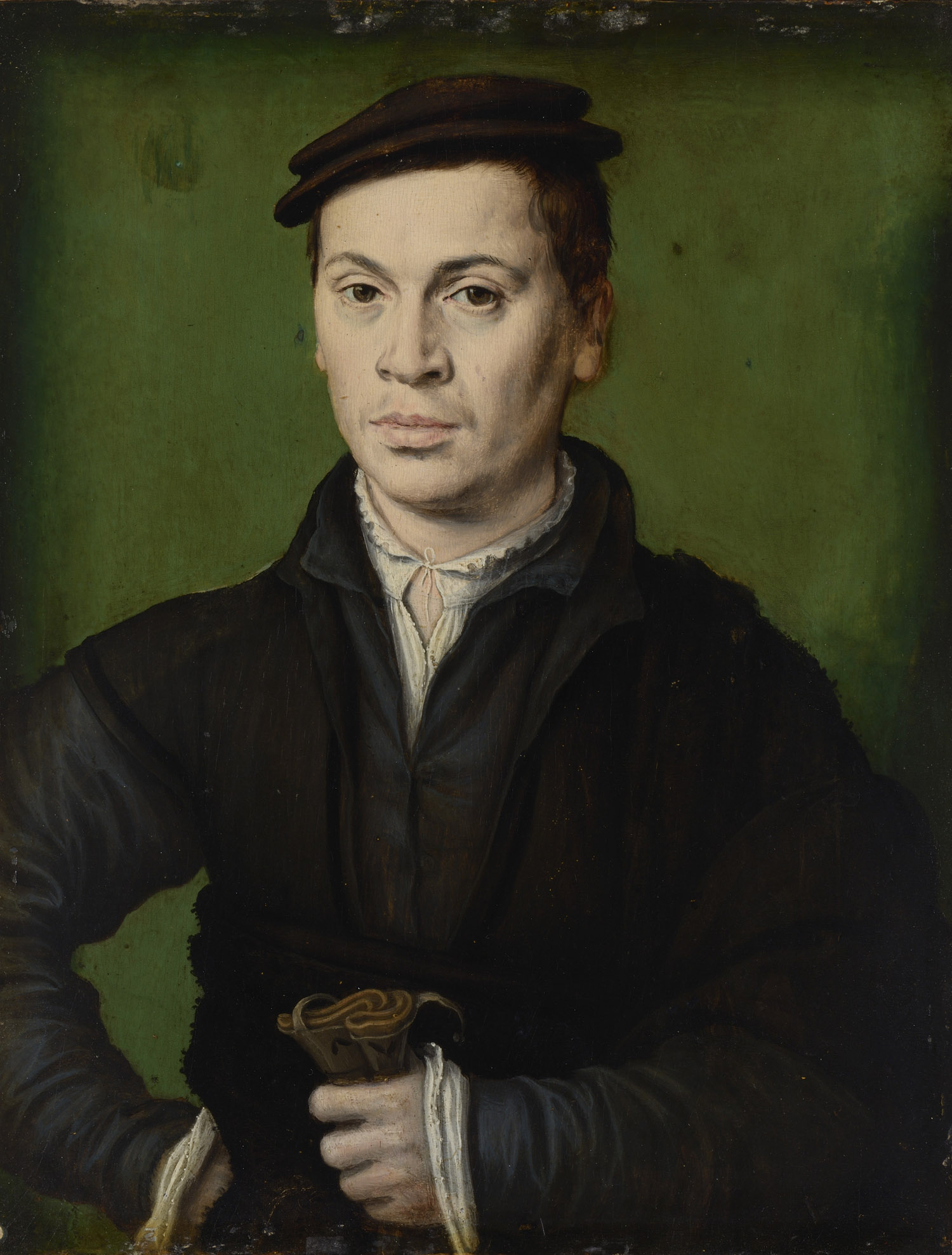
Man with black beret holding gloves, c. 1530, Lyon Museum of Fine Arts.

===== Flemish nation =====
Consisting mainly of artists, the Flemish nation was less significant than the Italian ones but exerted considerable artistic influence in painting and engraving. Many passed through Lyon en route to study in Italy; some settled permanently. More than twenty-two artists settled along the banks of the Rhône and Saône. The community was centered on the Rue Mercière, where Guillaume II Le Roy, Jean de Crane, Liévin Van der Meer, and Mathieu d'Anvers were active. The most prominent member was Corneille de Lyon, who resided on the Rue du Temple.

== Political life ==
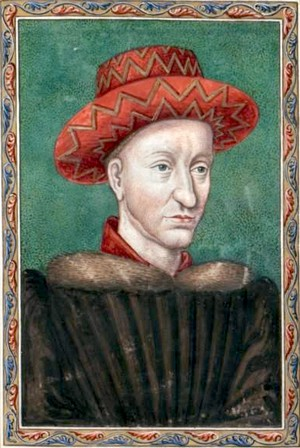
Charles VII.

From Charles VII to Francis I, the city saw its institutional structure undergo a major transformation. From a prosperous medieval commune whose freedoms were generally respected by the king, it became an international commercial center under close royal control, while its elite became fully integrated into the consolidating monarchical system. From the late 15th century onward, Lyon was drawn into conflicts among the major European powers, and the resulting influx of wealth led to significant evolution in its political organization.

=== The birth of the fairs and the city's transformation ===
In the second half of the 15th century, Lyon experienced rapid expansion owing to several favorable circumstances. Charles VII's conflict with Burgundy prompted him to grant Lyon the same privileges as the fairs of Brie and Champagne in 1420 and to establish two annual fairs in 1422. Initially modest, these fairs expanded considerably from the 1460s, transforming Lyon from a regional center into one of Europe's leading commercial and financial hubs.

==== Charles VII and integration into the kingdom ====
Around 1445, midway through Charles VII's reign, the city underwent a significant change. At that time the écorcheurs—bands of mercenaries—left the region after being summoned by the king to campaign in Alsace with his son, the future Louis XI, as part of a broader effort to remove these companies from the kingdom. On their return they were subject to the Grandes Ordonnances, which regulated and gradually suppressed their activities.

In 1444 the fairs resumed with strong royal support: a third annual fair was authorized, and merchants of the kingdom were forbidden to attend those in Geneva. Around the same time Jacques Cœur invested heavily in silver mines in the nearby mountains and formed partnerships with local notable families such as the Jossarts and Syvrieus; some of these families, including the Baronnats, later profited from his disgrace. The period saw a strong revival of economic activity in the Lyonnais.

From this point relations between the Lyonnais commune and the monarchy changed. Peace allowed the king to impose greater control over the urban elite through regular taxation and a permanent garrison. The consulate surrendered financial autonomy and influence over major appointments, but this was compensated by the integration of bourgeois figures into royal circles, which secured them desirable local offices. At the same time the 1447 reform of the consulate restricted membership to the wealthiest citizens, excluding the laboring classes and ending general assemblies.

===== Lyon between Charles VII and Dauphin Louis =====
Relations with the crown were distinctive between 1447 and 1457 while the dauphin Louis—the future Louis XI—was in exile in the Dauphiné. He visited Lyon on 7 January 1447 before entering the Dauphiné on 15 January. Initial relations were cordial, but Louis's ambitions created tensions, although the Lyonnais bourgeoisie remained loyal to Charles VII. Between 1455 and 1460 they secretly sent the dauphin 3,000 gold écus annually through clandestine messengers.

The situation became more complicated as conflict between father and son intensified. Louis's unauthorized marriage in 1452 to Charlotte of Savoy provoked a strong royal response in the region. Duke Louis I of Savoy negotiated a rapid settlement that left Lyon unaffected. In 1453 royal agents—Marshal de Lohéac, Admiral de Bueil, and Jacques de Chabannes—inspected the city's defenses and transferred command of Pierre Scize castle from the Sire de Beaujeu (Aymard) to Jacques de Lavieu, Sire de Fougerolles.

When Charles left in 1454, Louis retaliated by ravaging royal lands at Valbonne and Montluel. The response was immediate: Antoine de Chabannes encamped troops between Saint-Priest-en-Velin and Saint-Symphorien-d'Ozon in November. The king seized the castles of Rochetaillée, Saint-Bernard, and Genay, staying first at Yvours castle in Irigny and then at Saint-Priest. Over the next two years (1454–1457) he incorporated the Dauphiné into the royal domain and asserted control over the Franc-Lyonnais against Savoyard claims before departing in 1457.

On 25 July 1461—three days after Charles VII's death—Jean de Villeneuve and two delegates were sent to pledge Lyon's loyalty to Louis XI at Genappe before the official news reached him.

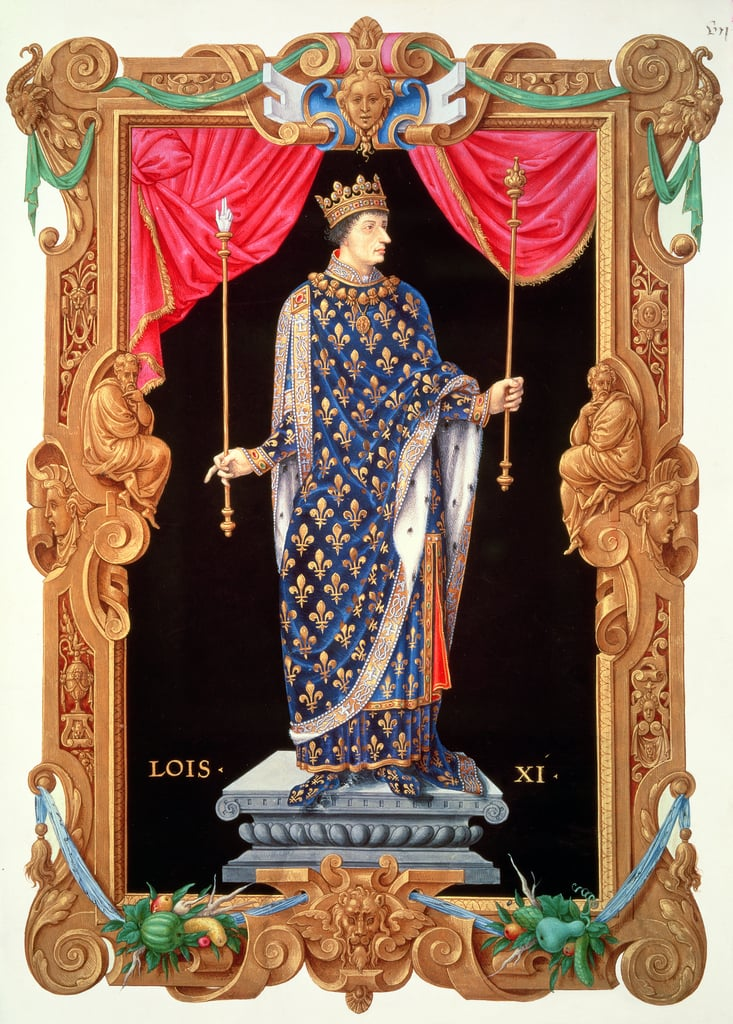
Louis XI, miniature from the Recueil des rois de France, c. 1550.

==== The rise of Lyon under Louis XI ====
Under Louis XI, Lyon avoided the reductions in municipal autonomy imposed on cities such as Angers, Amiens, Bourges, and Poitiers. Taxation and the appointment of officials remained relatively independent. Like Caen and Rouen, the king favored its prosperity and supported the fairs in return for consistent loyalty and prompt payments. Lyon maintained royal favor through embassies bearing gifts, and numerous Lyonnais in the royal entourage advocated on the city's behalf. (Note: Guillaume Becey (prosecutor in Lyon, then member of his council), Jean Botut (his secretary), Jean Palmier (doctor of law, judge in Lyon, president of the parliament, and elected to the Estates General of 1484), for example.) This loyalty was evident during the War of the Public Weal. While Archbishop Charles II de Bourbon and his uncle, the Bishop of Le Puy, joined the rebellion, Lyon gave full support to the king.

Lacking a standing army, Lyon supplied logistical support—money, provisions, and weapons—to the royal forces, including the Milanese contingent of Galeazzo Maria Sforza. While prudently refusing him entry to the city, Lyon facilitated his plundering in the Forez. Militarily, it contributed a modest company of franc-archers to all campaigns. The king ordered improvements to the fortifications and sent lieutenants to supervise the work.

Unlike other opponents, Louis reconciled with the archbishop, obtaining the legation of Avignon for him in 1472 through Pope Sixtus IV (legate: Cardinal Bessarion; an embassy had been sent to Pope Paul II in 1466 with Thibault de Luxembourg). Charles, more diplomat than prelate, was consecrated in Lyon, confirmed communal privileges, and subsequently served at court. Louis settled disputes in the city's favor against ecclesiastical authorities, including the Saint-Jean chapter (1477 Grenette hall incident). This favoritism, largely fiscal in motivation, extended to granting privileges for silk-working to compete with Italian luxury goods; wary of offending Italian partners, the consuls delayed implementation and financed the relocation of workers to Tours.

Between 1461 and 1476 Lyon served as a rear base for operations against the Duchy of Savoy during the wars in Burgundy. Constantly vigilant against Burgundian and Savoyard threats—frequently closing the gates and conducting espionage—the city experienced heightened tension after the 1468 alliance between Philip II of Savoy and Charles the Bold. It emerged unscathed, and after 1476 benefited from Louis's guardianship over the young Duke Philibert I and control of Savoy through the arranged marriages of the children of the late Yolande of France.

Louis made an extended stay in Lyon in 1476 (March–July). (Note: In 1463, due to the Savoy duchy conflict provoked by Philip II of Savoy, Louis XI was due to come to Lyon urgently. The situation improved, and Toulouse fire abruptly prevented the king's trip. "My sister, I commend myself to you. I have received the letters you wrote to me via Master Pierre Doriolle, and I have heard what he told me on your behalf. I am currently leaving for Bayonne, and as soon as I have finished with the King of Castile, which will be, as I expect, God willing, around mid-February, I intend to go straight to Lyon and the markets beyond, and for this reason, you and my father-in-law of Savoy should go to Chambery, so that you will be ready to meet me. I do not know if you have done what I asked you to do through the Marshal of Savoy, and for this reason, please write to me. And, regarding what you have told me that Philip of Savoy wants to go to Piedmont, and that there could be danger there, there is none, for wherever he goes, I intend to go and find him in person, if he does not do as I have commanded through the said marshal (Beginning of 1463).") Lodging not at the cathedral chapter (except on 1 June at the Fourvière Chapel), but in the house of the bourgeois Jacques Caille, he managed Italian affairs and the war of Charles the Bold against the Swiss, receiving news of the Battle of Morat on 24 June—just two days after the event—through efficient couriers. (Note: "My lord Grand Master, I have received your letters, and shortly before Pierre Cleret arrived, I received news that last Saturday, at daybreak, the Duke of Burgundy was attacked by the Swiss and lost many men, his entire camp, and his artillery, and fled to Jougne on horseback. I beg you to keep your men ready, but do not start anything, and do not let your men undertake anything that could be said to break the truce. Pierre Cleret will write to you in more detail. Written in Lyon, on the 24th day of June. LOYS. J.MESME. To my lord the Grand Master.") This led to the creation of a postal relay system the following year, marking the beginning of modern communication. He also attempted to convene a general council in Lyon, welcomed the legate Giuliano della Rovere on 15 June, and hosted René I of Anjou from 4 May to 9 June to resolve the succession in Provence and Anjou. Foiling plots, he imprisoned Duke Jacques de Nemours in a large iron cage at Pierre Scize before transferring him to the Bastille. Louis returned briefly in May 1482 after a pilgrimage to Saint-Claude.

Under Louis XI consular elections proceeded without incident. The consulate included officers (Grants, Paterins) and bankers (Villars, Baronnats) but no Italians despite their growing prominence. Oversight of the trade masters was absent, and general assemblies ceased. Day-to-day administration was routine, punctuated by embassies sent to secure royal favor or negotiate contributions. In Italian affairs the king's ally Lorenzo de' Medici maintained an agent in Lyon. When Lyonnet de Roussy was arrested in 1472 on suspicion of Genoese intrigues, Louis intervened on behalf of "my compère." On 14 May 1484 Louis wrote from Lyon to Lorenzo.

In Louis XI's final years (1480–1483) Lyon faced heavy financial demands for the upkeep of the army, principally for the annexation of Burgundy and the repopulation of Arras. (Note: Thus, "The Swiss had rights over the county of Burgundy. Lyon provided five thousand pounds," for the first term, namely in January 1482.) After the Battle of Guinegatte in 1479, army modernization included the creation of the Picardie bands at Pont-de-l'Arche. Lyon paid in these years as much as during the entire previous reign. The peak of taxation in 1482 represented the high point of royal fiscal pressure for generations. The city's prosperity nonetheless continued. Louis XI died on 30 August 1483.

=== The era of the Italian Wars ===
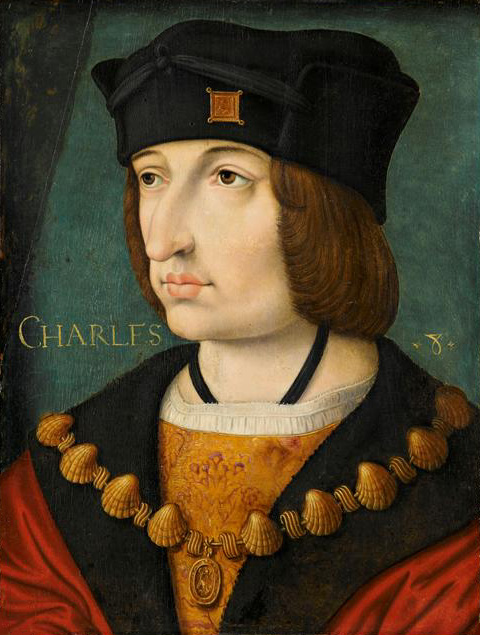
Charles VIII, portrait at the Musée Condé, Chantilly.

==== Charles VIII ====
Following Louis XI's death in 1483, regent Anne de Beaujeu attempted to curtail Lyon's privileges in favor of other royal cities that had become economically stagnant. In 1484, however, these privileges were restored at the request of Charles VIII, who required substantial funds for his projected Italian campaign. The regent nevertheless promoted the fairs by developing a new route from Moulins to Lyon via Tarare, using river barges on the Loire in place of the old Roman road.

Charles VIII arrived in March 1494 en route to conquer the Kingdom of Naples, thereby beginning the Italian Wars. The young king remained in the city for five months while persuading his council and organising the expedition. The campaign was financed by Italian bankers and by royal towns; Lyon contributed 10,000 livres in return for confirmation of its four annual fairs.

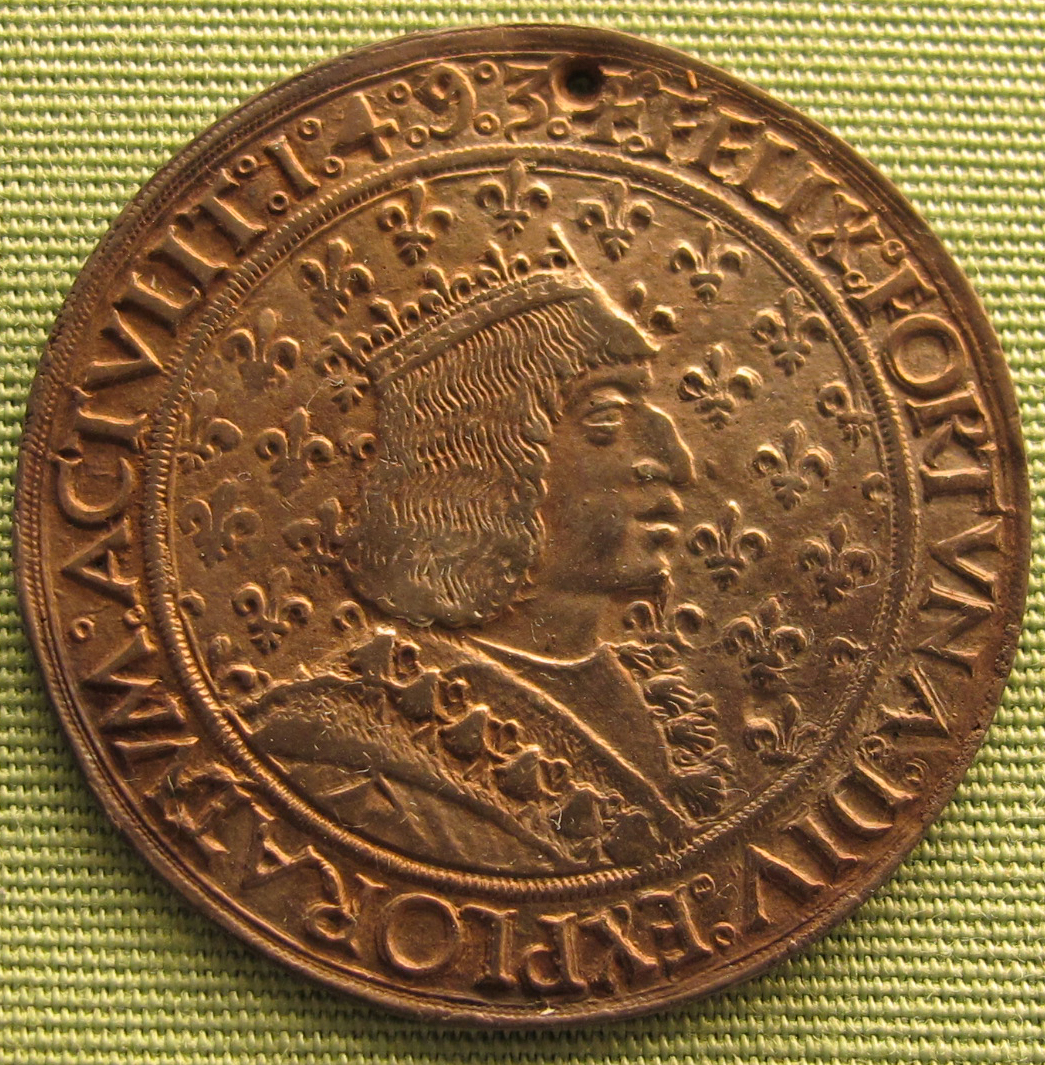
Medal of Charles VIII, presented by Lyon to Anne of Brittany. 1494. BnF, royal series no. 31.

The expedition left in July; wealthy Lyonnais merchants acted as quartermasters and profited considerably, although some incurred losses. Charles returned in November 1495 and was greeted with elaborate celebrations, but these were quickly followed by new demands for funds for another campaign. In exchange for further subsidies the consuls obtained a patent of December 1495 granting nobility to members of the consulate.

Over the next two years Charles extracted additional funds for a second attempt to reconquer Naples, but he died in April 1498 without achieving it. The grant of nobility and the repeated levies caused popular discontent and repeated accusations that the elite were mismanaging municipal funds.

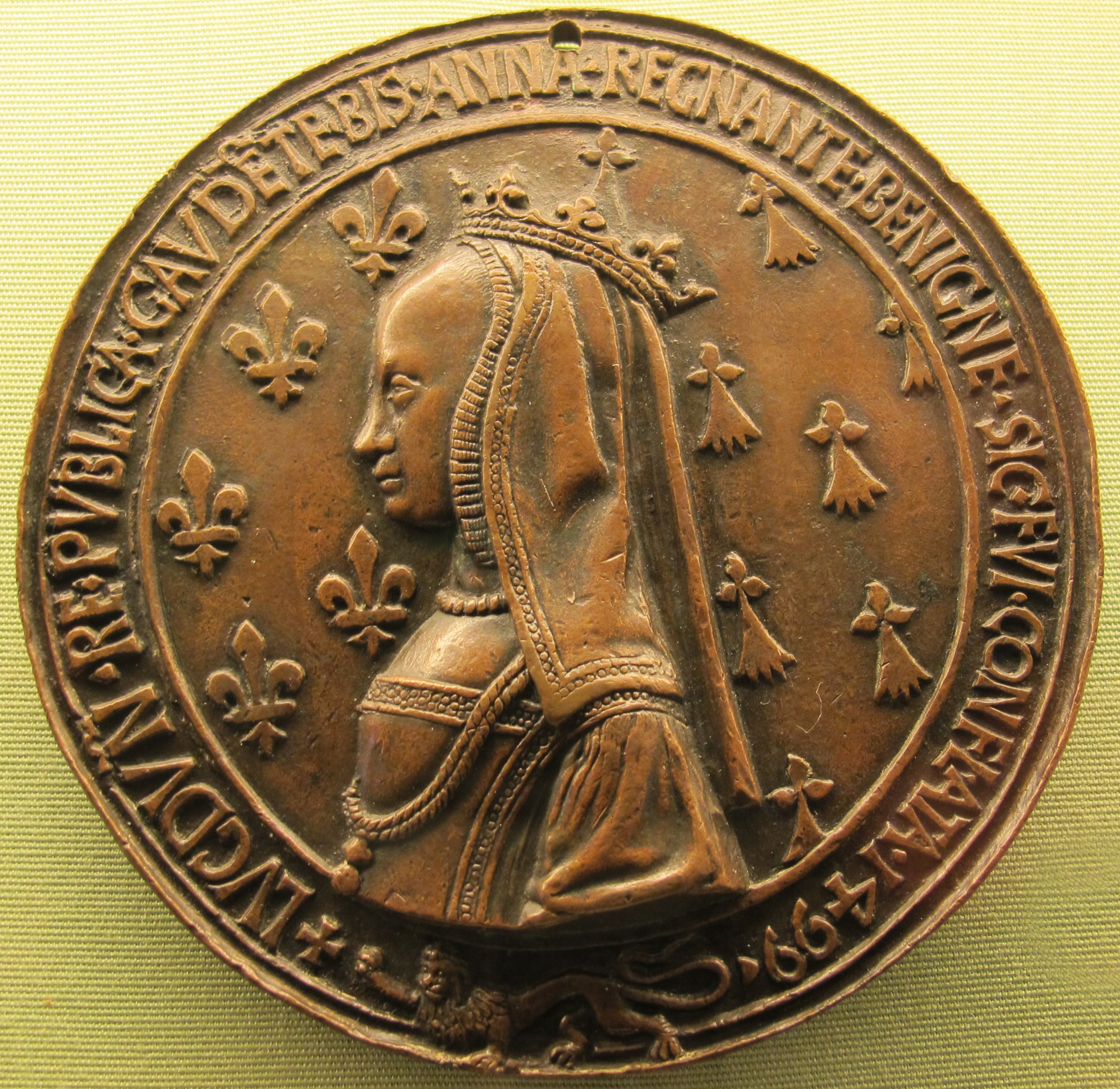
Medal cast honoring Queen Anne of Brittany's 1499 Lyon passage. (Note: "Lugdun re publica gaudete bis Anna regnante benigne sic fui conflata 1499" (When Lyon's state rejoiced in the benevolent second reign of Queen Anne, I [medal] was thus cast, 1499). After remarrying Louis XII, Anne pilgrimaged to Saint-Claude, Jura, a Louis XI-era site, beseeching Saint Claude for a viable heir. At 21, she had lost husband Charles VIII and six children. She bore Princess Claude of France.)

==== Louis XII ====
Louis XII continued the expansionist policy, this time aiming at the Milan. Lyon again served as a staging ground and diplomatic center, accommodating the court, nobility, and ambassadors from 1499 to 1503. The effects of the Italian Wars were twofold: increased royal subsidies against the background of wealth generated by the fairs, and enhanced prestige from hosting prominent figures. In 1498 the king's ally Cesare Borgia was granted the honorary governorship of Lyon, though he never exercised it.

Lyon followed royal fortunes closely. Preparations for the Milan campaign took place in the summer of 1498, followed by celebrations and a commemorative medal on 7 November. Defeats the following year led to regrouping in 1500; subsequent victories brought the captives Ludovico and Ascanio Sforza to imprisonment at Pierre-Scize.

Under Louis, grain shortages in 1501 and 1504–1505 remained relatively mild and caused no major disturbances.

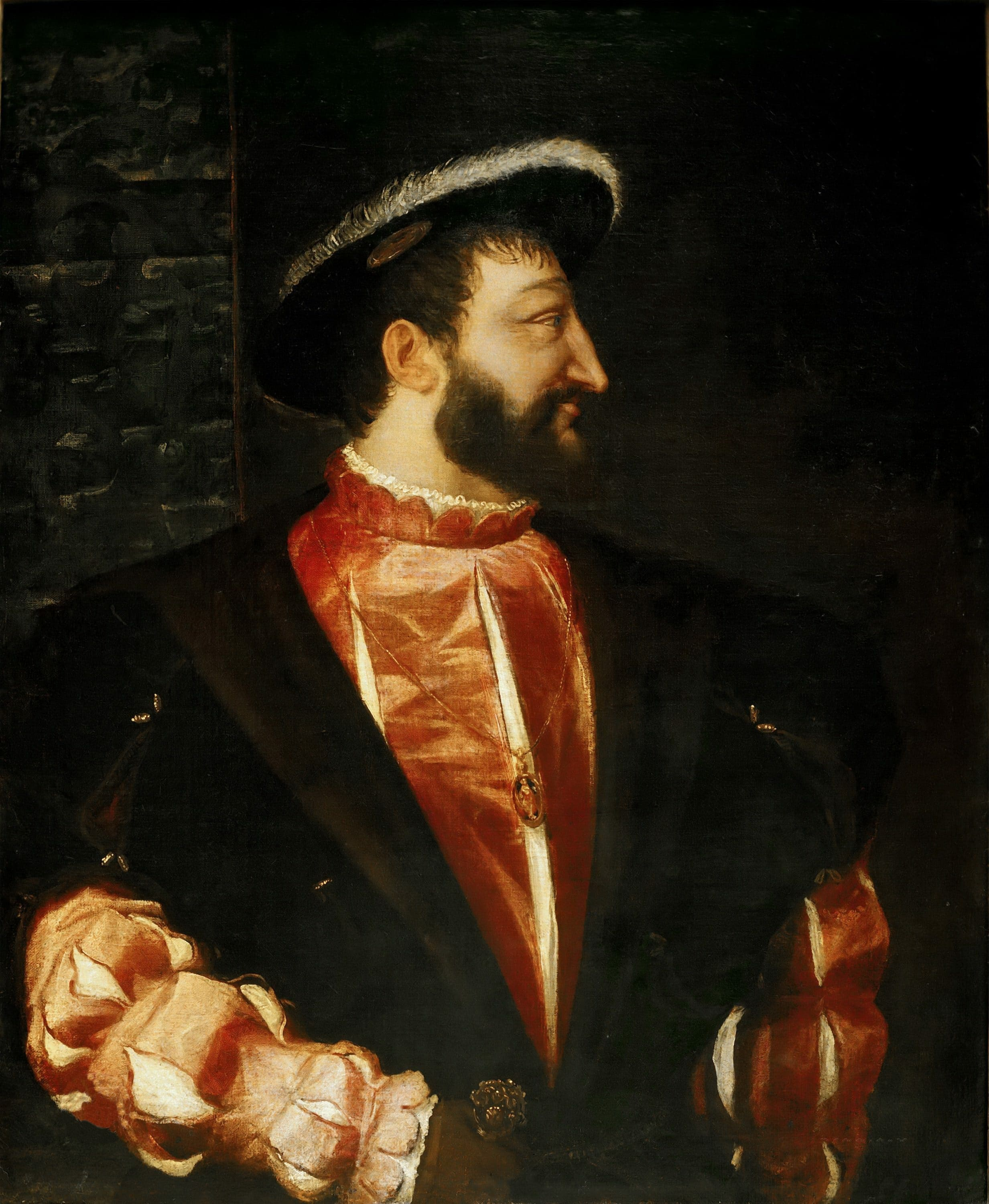
Francis I.

==== Francis I ====
Upon his accession in 1515, Francis I prepared a campaign for Milan, basing the government in Lyon with Chancellor Antoine Duprat and the financier general Semblançay. Borrowing 300,000 écus from Lyonnais banks at rates of approximately 16% became the standard method of financing the war. The victory at the Battle of Marignano was celebrated with elaborate festivities.

Returning in 1522 for the Sixth Italian War, Francis learned of the defeat at Bicocca. In 1523 40,000 troops under Guillaume de Bonnivet assembled in the region; Francis arrived on 22 August and waited for the traitor Constable Charles de Bourbon before crossing the Alps. The scale of the plot delayed departure, led to the closing of the city gates, and resulted in arrests, and prompted Charles to advise Charles V to attack Lyon. Provence was invaded instead, but Charles failed before Marseille. Bonnivet led the army into Italy while Francis remained behind.

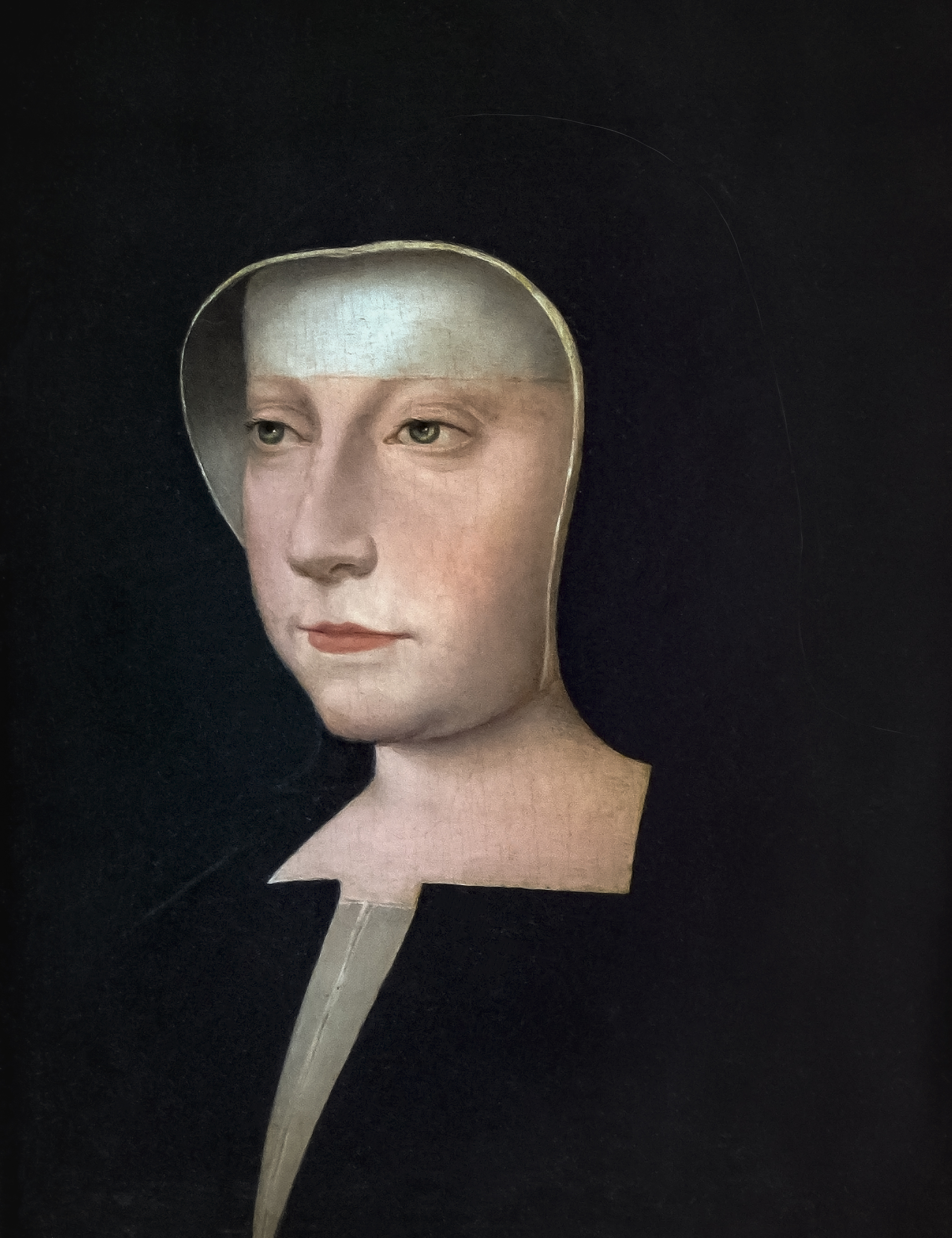
Louise of Savoy, regent during the Sixth Italian War.

===== Royal government in Lyon and the regency =====
Francis re-entered the city on 7 August 1524 accompanied by his mother Louise of Savoy, his sister Margaret of Navarre, and the court. He passed through quickly, but the government remained for more than fifteen months. Moving on to Provence, he repelled the imperial invasion and retook Milan. The entire state apparatus assembled in Lyon: the King's Council, the Grand Council, Duprat, the clergy, financiers, and diplomats. The court's patronage of humanism stimulated intellectual activity in the city.

News of the disaster at the Battle of Pavia prompted the regent Louise to centralise power and summon Bourbon and additional troops. The remnants of the Italian army returned under the Duke of Alençon (who died in Lyon) and Henry II of Navarre. The consulate hastily strengthened the fortifications despite severe financial constraints. The 1525 Treaty of Moore—ratified on 21 October—with Henry VIII of England made cities such as Lyon guarantors in the event of royal default. Louise left in February 1526 after the Treaty of Madrid secured Francis's release, a treaty negotiated in part by the future Archbishop Francis de Tournon.

===== The 1529–1531 grain crisis and the Great Rebeyne of 1529 =====
In April 1529 grain riots broke out amid fluctuating wheat prices and shortages caused by population growth. Placards incited crowds to attack the Cordeliers convent as alleged hoarders. The consulate's inaction led to the pillaging on 25 April of several houses, the Cordeliers convent, the residence of Symphorien Champier, the town hall, and the flour weigh-house. Overwhelmed notables and Lieutenant-General Pomponne de Trivulce (nephew of the absent Governor Teodoro Trivulzio) took refuge in the Saint-Jean cloister. Mobilization of the militia failed because artisans and shopkeepers were excluded from power.

The following day rioters searched for supposed hidden reserves; on 27 April they attacked the abbey on Île Barbe. Royal authorities reasserted control by mobilising the militia. The governor arrested seventeen people; eleven were hanged without delay. Grain scarcity recurred in 1530 accompanied by plague in April, and again in 1531. Desperate rural poor poured into the city and died in large numbers. Traditional aid through the pennons proved insufficient, and the elite distributed food liberally before establishing the General Alms to assist the able-bodied destitute.

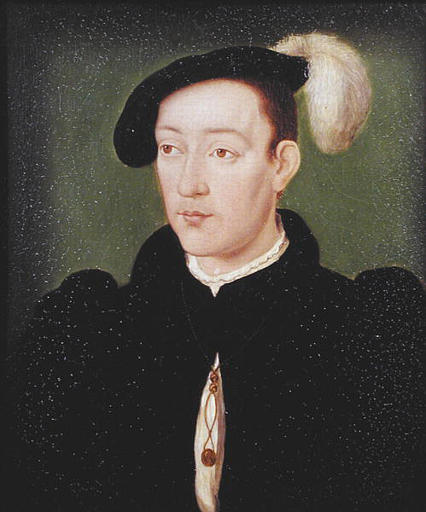
Francis of France, by Corneille de Lyon. Chantilly; Musée Condé.

===== End of Francis I's reign =====
The 1530s saw several royal processions through Lyon connected with Italian affairs. Notable events included the 1533 entry of Eleanor of Austria accompanied by the Dauphin Francis and the Cardinal-Legate Duprat, and the 1537 marriage of James V and Madeleine of France.

Fearing a possible Alpine offensive by Charles V in 1536, Francis established himself in Lyon to oversee military and diplomatic preparations. While there he learned of the death of his son Francis in August. Suspecting poison, he arrested Count Sebastiano Montecuculli (who had offered the prince water shortly before the onset of illness) and condemned him to be quartered and gibbeted at the city gates. During this stay Francis also granted Piedmontese merchants privileges to practise silk-weaving in Lyon.

In 1539 Lyon experienced the first printers' strike in France—the so-called grand tric—when the griffarins guild halted work for several months in pursuit of better conditions. They achieved little, and subsequent litigation reaffirmed the dominance of the trade masters.

From the 1540s onward French foreign policy shifted toward the north and east, diminishing Lyon's strategic role and reducing the frequency of royal visits. New trade taxes damaged the fairs, particularly the silk sector. Escalating royal financial demands forced the city to adopt innovative and sometimes resisted forms of taxation on the population.

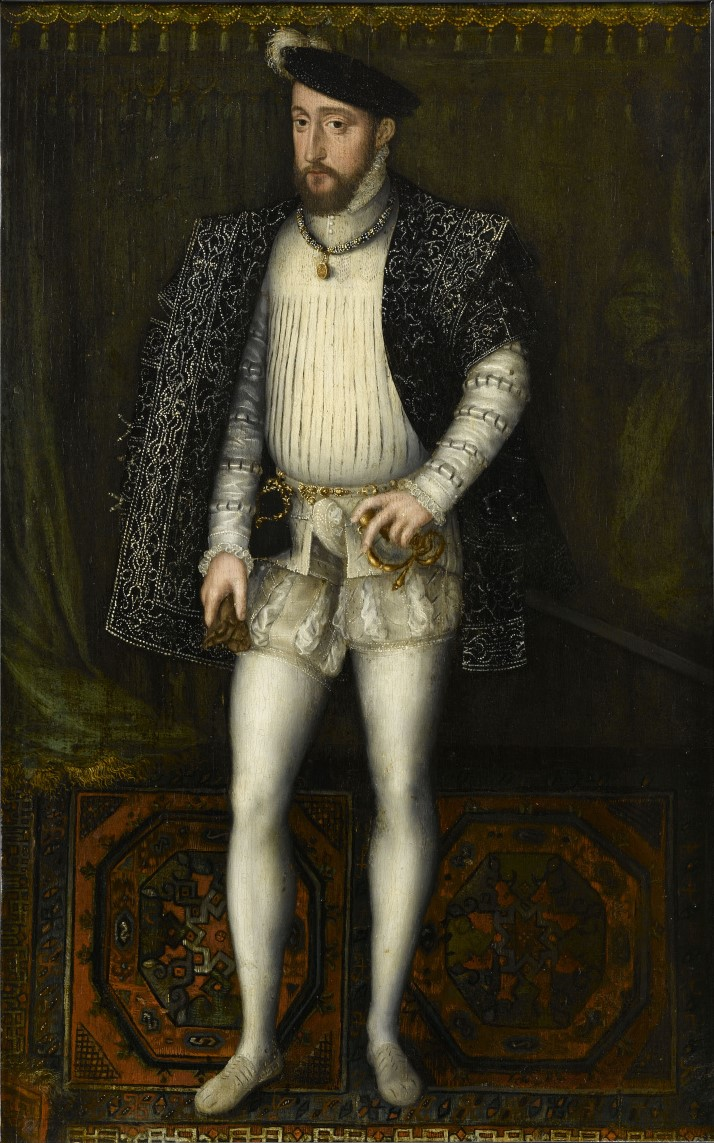
Henry II. Workshop of François Clouet. Chantilly; Musée Condé. PE 555.

==== Henry II ====
Henry II entered the city on 23 September 1548 and was received with an elaborate entry intended to display royal power to the new sovereign. Italian merchants imported artists: the painter Nannoccio della Costa da San Giorgio and the sculptor Zanobi for theatrical performances at the archiepiscopal palace.

Henry's reign saw an expansion of royal administration. Seeking tighter control over the city, he sent commissaires drawn from the Maîtres des Requêtes to the Hôtel de Ville. He increased the staff of the généralité and created a présidial court in 1551, thereby reorganising local finances. These reforms supported an ambitious military policy that exhausted credit by 1555. Henry and his financiers consolidated the debts into the Grand Parti, which remained unresolved; the bankruptcy of 1557 severely damaged Lyonnais bankers, many of whom either left the city or scaled back their operations.

=== Wars of Religion in Lyon ===
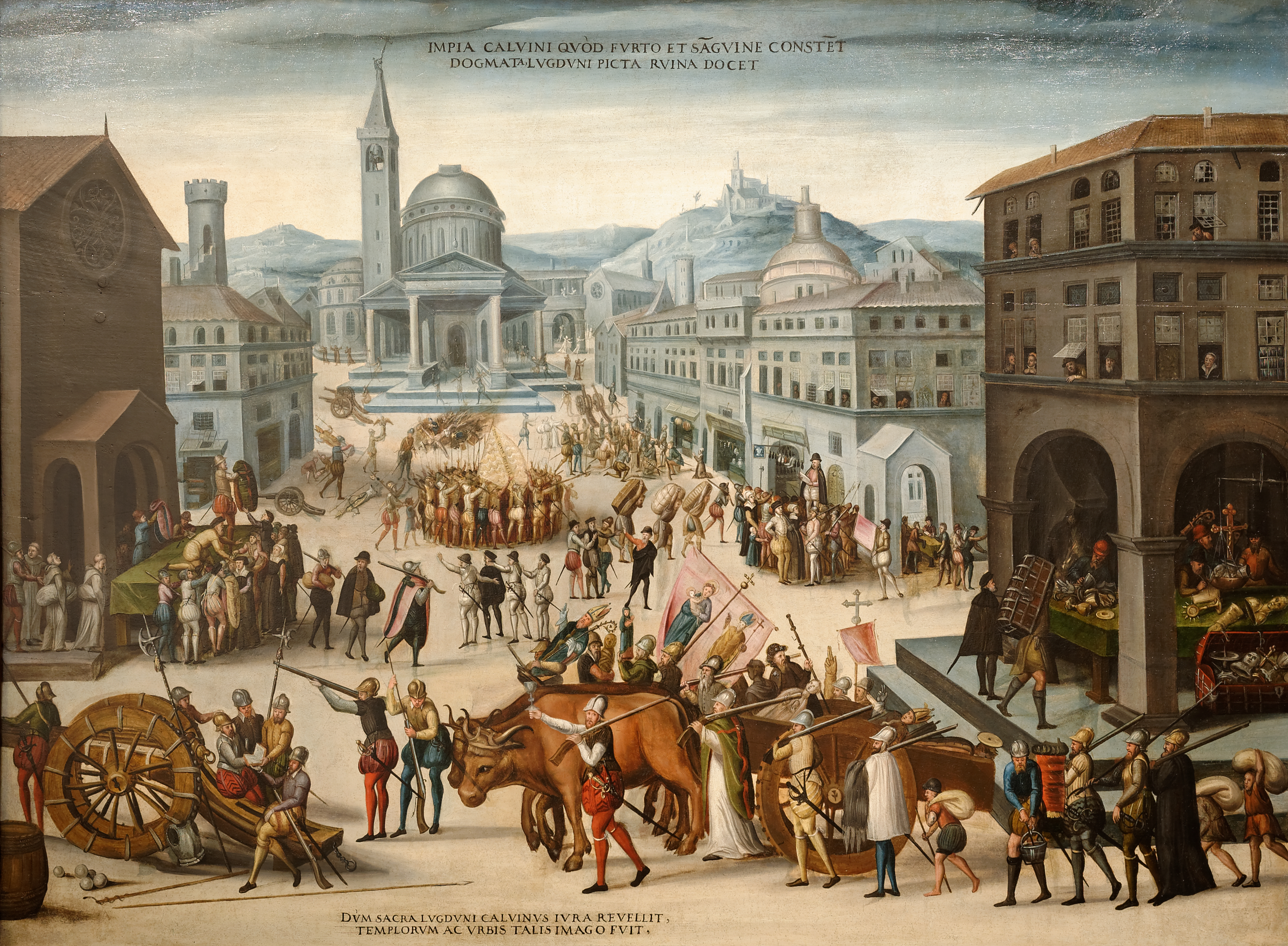
The Sack of Lyon by the Calvinists in 1562, school of Antoine Caron, 16th century, collections of the Musée Gadagne.

Toward the end of Henry II's reign, during the 1550s, tensions leading to the Wars of Religion escalated across France and in Lyon. The city was directly affected from the conflict's outset by the Protestants' seizure of power in 1562 and the violent actions of Baron des Adrets. This brief episode, though intense, was less destructive than events in many other parts of France. It was not until the 1570s, with the so-called "Lyonnais vespers", that the city experienced severe internal conflict, resulting in a large-scale exodus of Protestants.

==== Rise of tensions ====
In the 1550s friction intensified between uncompromising Catholics and the consulate. The latter sought to maintain independence and religious tolerance in order to protect the fairs, which were essential to the city's prosperity.

Following the 1551 Edict of Châteaubriant, Archbishop François de Tournon and the judicial authorities pursued repressive measures that were frequently opposed by the consulate and the seneschal's court. Nevertheless, several arrests and executions took place, including that of the minister Claude Monier in 1551 and of five students from Lausanne in 1552. Around a dozen executions occurred during the decade, heightening tensions without preventing the spread of Reformed ideas.

In 1559–1560 Protestants armed themselves throughout France, forming companies and attempting to seize cities or engaging in clashes with Catholics—for example, Charles Dupuy-Montbrun's attempt in the Comtat Venaissin or Paul de Mouvans's actions in Provence. In this context the Protestants made their first attempt to take Lyon in September 1560, but the plot was foiled by Lieutenant Antoine d'Albon acting for Governor Jacques d'Albon de Saint-André. Organized by Edme de Maligny during a fair and supported by Calvin, the conspirators infiltrated the city disguised as merchants. When discovered, Antoine d'Albon's arquebusiers engaged them on the Rue Longue; the Protestants were repelled and fled the following day along with compromised local supporters. Governor Jacques d'Albon hurried to the city and imposed severe repression.

The archbishop, who was highly active, summoned preachers and arranged for the printing and distribution of French-language books of piety and devotional images. This vigorous proselytism increased the charged atmosphere. During the Corpus Christi procession on 5 June 1561 a young Protestant who desecrated the host was lynched by the crowd; the disturbance rapidly escalated, with assaults on Huguenots and the killing of the suspected heretic Barthélemy Aneau. The regent Catherine de' Medici's national policy of appeasement also applied to Lyon. Lieutenant Antoine d'Albon, regarded as excessively harsh, was replaced by François d'Agoult, Count of Sault. The consulate, seeking compromise, admitted two Reformed members in December 1561: the bookseller Henri de Gabiano and the silk merchant Guillaume Henry.

==== 1562: Lyon as a Protestant city ====
Nationwide, Protestants armed themselves fearing repression and either defended or seized cities. Attempts took place in Tours, Blois, Poitiers, Bourges, Sens, Angers, and elsewhere. Many failed and strongholds were quickly retaken by royal troops. The Protestant takeover of Lyon occurred within this broader movement.

===== Seizure and organization of power =====
Tensions reached their peak when rumors of an approaching Catholic army mobilized the local Protestants. Overnight on 29–30 April 1562 they seized the main strategic points: the town hall, the squares, the bridges, and the gates. By dawn only the lieutenant-general d'Agoult and the canons of Saint-Jean offered brief resistance. The canons fled the following night and d'Agoult surrendered on 1 May. The Protestants kept him in office and proclaimed their loyalty to Charles IX, claiming they acted to free him from the influence of the Guise family.

To maintain control in a predominantly Catholic city they called on the Baron des Adrets, an ally of Condé, for military assistance. He rapidly organized defenses and requested Swiss support. To secure supplies he took Reformed communities in Belleville, Mâcon, and Chalon by force. Criticized for the atrocities committed by his troops—even by fellow Reformed—he was arrested on 10 January 1563 for negotiating surrender with the Duke of Nemours and remained imprisoned until the end of the Protestant occupation.

The Protestants preserved a legal façade while holding real power. An extraordinary assembly on 7 May 1562 added twelve new consuls without removing the Catholic incumbents, temporarily increasing the total to twenty-four in order to maintain appearances. Several Catholic consuls went into exile, while actual decisions were taken by parallel bodies: a consistory of exemplary Protestants who handled all matters and a council of the Reformed Church that liquidated seized ecclesiastical property and paid ministers.

===== Protestant actions in Lyon =====
The most visible action was a wave of iconoclasm: all churches were looted and Catholic worship was suppressed. Statues in Saint-Jean Cathedral were destroyed or decapitated; its rood screen and the cloister of Saint-Just were demolished by 23 May. Religious motives predominated, though strategic considerations also played a role—the fortified Saint-Just stood on a promontory that was difficult to defend. Clergy were expelled, Masses prohibited, and attendance at Reformed services made compulsory. The effect on belief is uncertain, but peak communion attendance reached approximately 25,000.

During their short period of control the Protestants carried out extensive urban improvements that reshaped Lyon: major streets were widened, a new ascent to Fourvière was created, the Saint-Jean walls were breached to allow north–south passage, a Peninsula route aligned with the Guillotière bridge was opened (Rue Bellecordière), Rue de Clermont was driven through the Saint-Pierre abbey enclosure, the Lanterne ditches were filled to form the future Place des Terreaux, etc. These works were primarily functional and derived from long-discussed projects; none were reversed by the later Catholic consulates.

Economically the Protestant consulate faced the collapse of commerce, which drastically reduced revenue while expenditure on works and defense soared. The fairs ceased and foreign merchants and bankers fled. Rents and taxes went unpaid and soldiers demanded prompt wages under threat of pillage. Without the relief provided by trade, the inhabitants bore heavy burdens and the consulate accumulated a debt that progressively constrained the city.

The queen appointed the Duke of Nemours governor of the Lyonnais on 27 December 1562, but the consuls rejected him as an enemy. They asked Condé to send a lord to restrain des Adrets' troops; he sent Jean de Parthenay-Larchevêque, Lord of Soubise. Soubise put an end to the excesses of des Adrets, prioritised defense against Nemours, and assumed the governorship of Lyon. The queen demanded his resignation, which he refused. He defeated Nemours and forced his withdrawal.

===== End of Protestant power =====
Lyon's fate was determined by national events, which quickly turned against the Protestants. Prince Condé's failure at Dreux doomed the Huguenot uprisings; Catherine de' Medici demanded Soubise's submission and threatened the destruction of Lyon. Protestant leaders resisted for six months but were disappointed by the terms of the Edict of Amboise in March 1563. Emissaries negotiated with the queen mother and obtained the removal of the hated Nemours, who was replaced by Marshal de Vieilleville. An assembly of notables on 9 June accepted the conditions, the most difficult of which was the return of ecclesiastical property. The marshal entered the city on 15 June and the Edict of Amboise was proclaimed on 24 June.

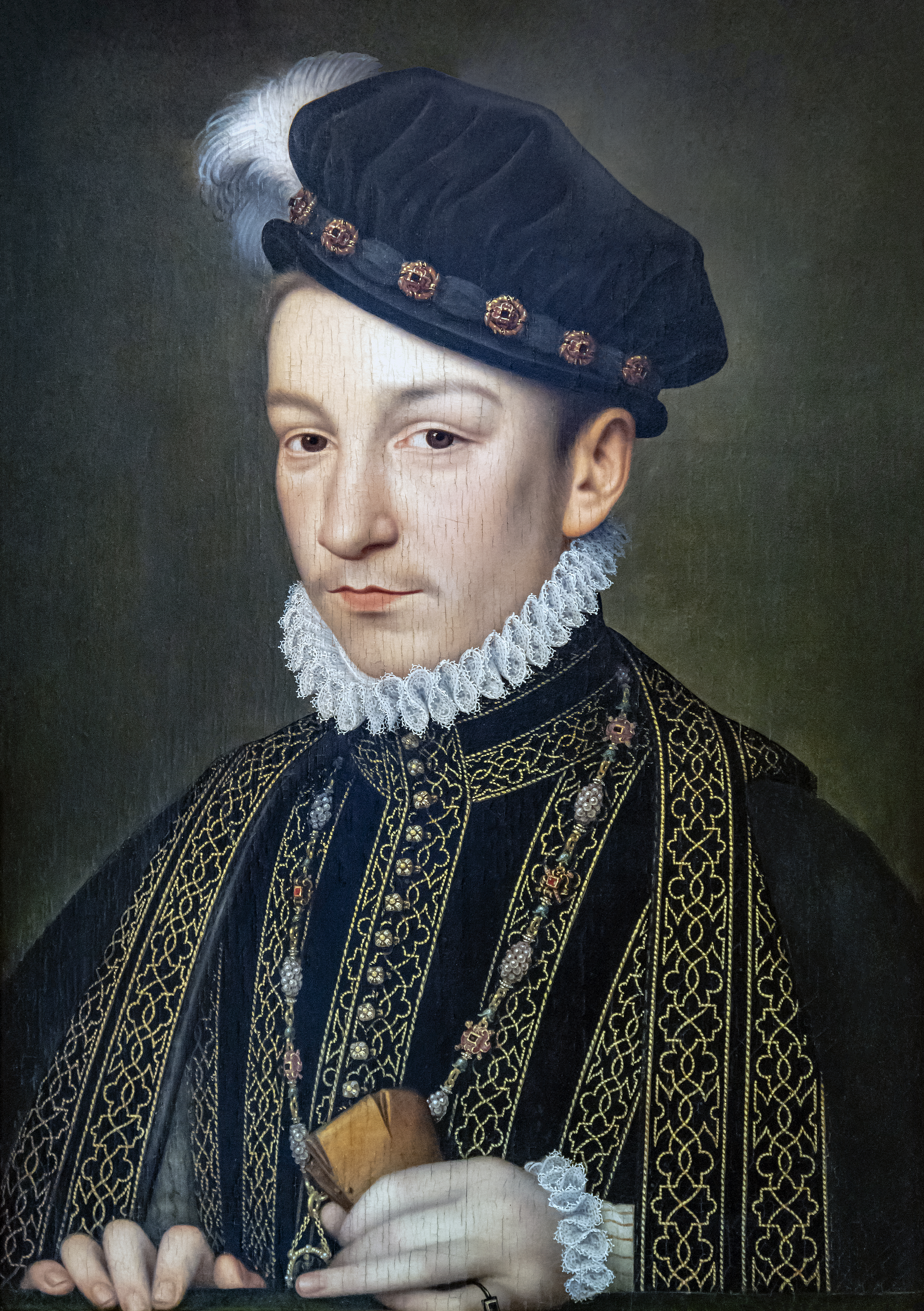
Charles IX by François Clouet, Fondation Bemberg.

==== Catholic reconquest: 1563–1575 ====
After the Protestant interlude Lyon enjoyed relative confessional calm between 1563 and 1566. Tensions persisted—insults and threats occurred—but no major violence broke out. Protestants were able to hold a national synod in the city in August 1563. Violence subsided with the disbandment of armed bands, a development long-awaited by the population.

Under the Catholic governor Vieilleville, however, Protestant emigration began. The Reformed community shrank to 400–500 regular communicants. Vieilleville granted a small concession: contrary to the terms of the Edict of Amboise, two intramural temples were authorised, followed by a third.

The plague of 1564, which killed about one-third of the population, provoked a polemical exchange between Catholic preacher Father Edmond Auger and Protestant pastor Pierre Viret. The controversy generated pamphlets printed by Catholic presses (Michel Jove) and Protestant ones (Jean Saugrain). The passage of Charles IX in June–July 1564—organized by the poet and schoolmaster Charles Fontaine—did not calm the situation. The king issued an edict prohibiting Protestant worship inside the city walls and requiring it to take place outside in accordance with the Edict of Amboise. The prohibition was widely ignored; services continued at the temples of Paradis, Bourgneuf (Fleur de Lys), and Terreaux.

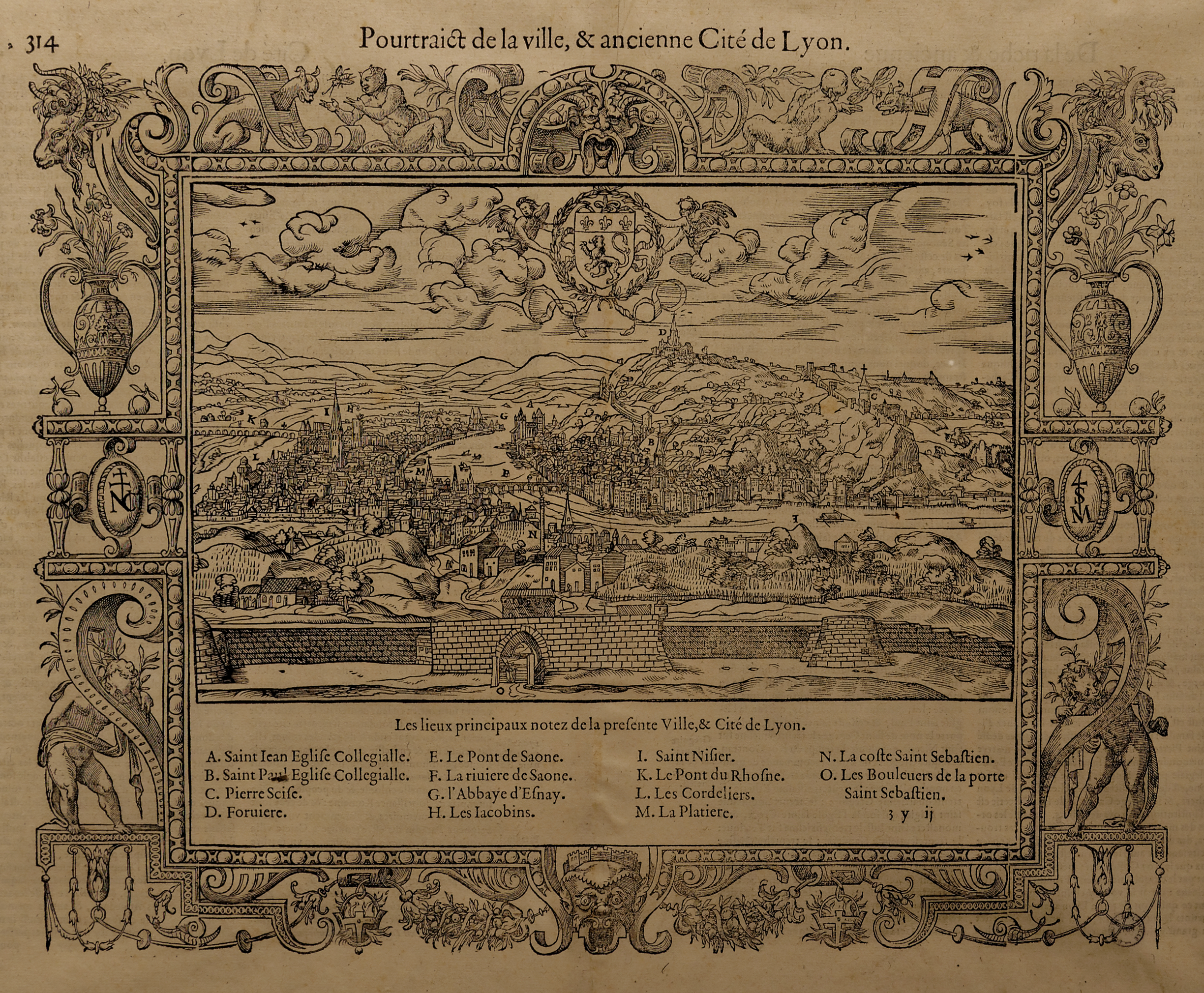
Antoine du Pinet's map, published 1575, showing Côte Saint-Sébastien sans fortress.

Although a parity consulate had been envisaged, from 1564 the king increasingly influenced appointments in favor of loyalists. Only the Reformed consuls protested against the violation of consular liberties, finding no support from their Catholic colleagues. Nevertheless, confessional division among the elite remained incomplete; members of both sides collaborated to reduce tensions and to continue the urban policies initiated under Protestant rule.

The monarchy, considering Lyon unreliable, constructed a citadel ostensibly for the city's protection but intended to house a garrison of loyal troops nearby. Completed in 1565, the Saint-Sébastien citadel accommodated 400 men. (Note: The citadel's exact location uncertain: 1570 plan places at future Chartreux enclosure; alternatives between Grand'Côte and Rue de la Tourette.) (Note: No dedicated study exists; scant subterranean traces remain.) The population regarded the fortress as a sign of royal distrust and protested against the demolitions required for its construction.

Peaceful coexistence ended in 1567–1568. All official pastors were expelled. Many Protestants, particularly printers, emigrated—mostly to Geneva. Reformed preaching was suppressed and worship sites were regularly closed. In this climate of rising tension the Protestant community was effectively destroyed on 31 August 1572 in the so-called "Lyonnais vespers".

==== The "Lyonnais vespers" and the end of Lyonnais Protestantism: 1572 ====
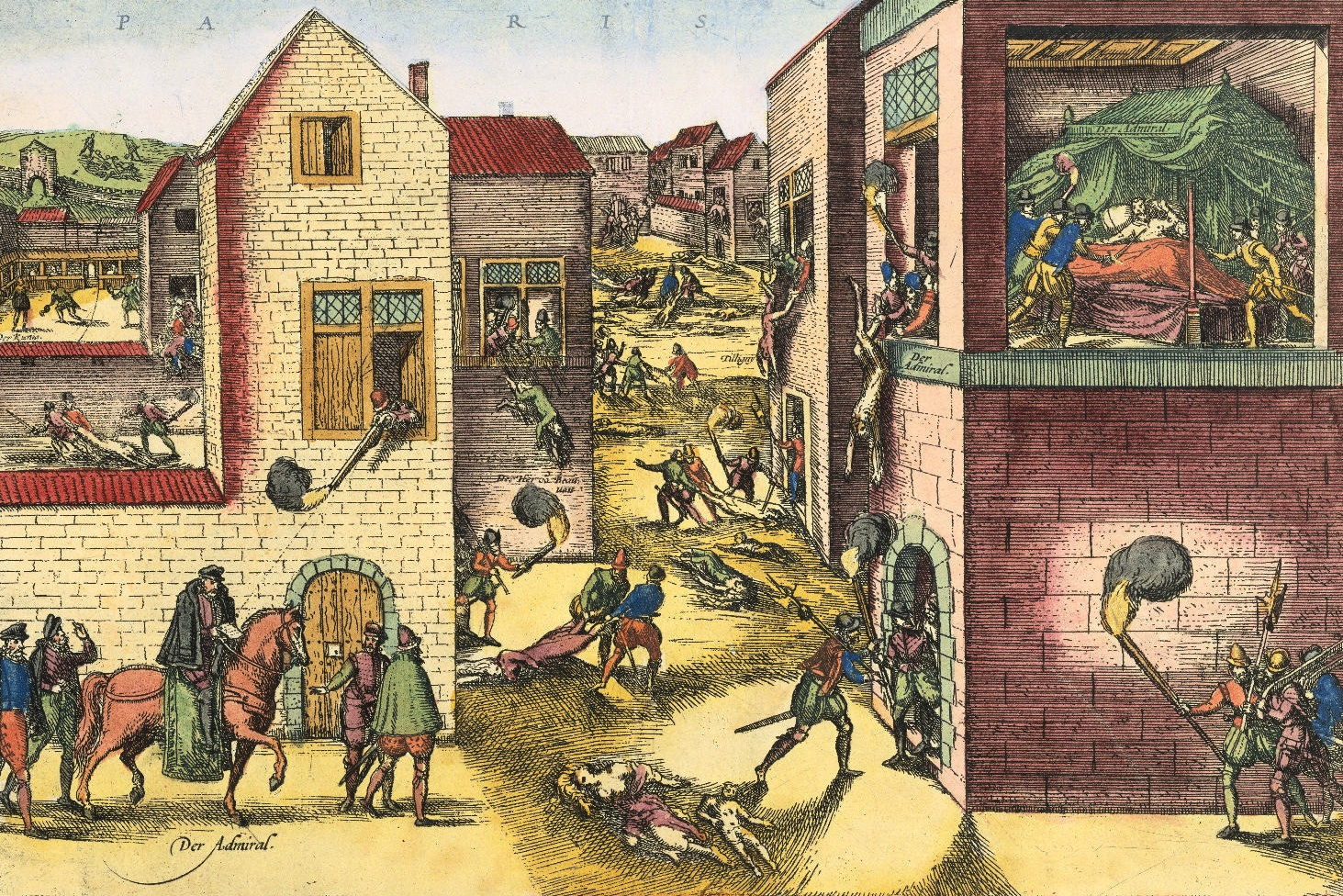
Engraving depicting Admiral Coligny's assassination and St. Bartholomew's Day massacre, Frans Hogenberg, c. 1572, BnF Department of Prints and Photography.

Triggered by news of the St. Bartholomew's Day massacre, the event resulted in the killing of several hundred Protestants in an enthusiastic Catholic reaction.

The primary cause was the time lag between official news and rumours of the Paris massacre. By 24–25 August travellers and merchants reported the attempted assassination of Coligny on 22 August and the subsequent killings. The governor did not receive the royal letter until the 27th. Popular agitation increased. The governor posted guards at strategic points and published the king's letter calling for calm, temporarily restoring order.

On the evening of the 28th a letter from courtiers at the consulate detailed the killings in Paris from 24 to 26 August and concluded that the king approved them, implying that Lyon should follow suit. Read in session, the letter circulated quickly and rekindled unrest. The consulate hesitated in the absence of clear orders; Catholic radicals gained the upper hand, two moderates left the meeting, and responsibility for the ensuing massacre fell on the remaining members. They ordered the imprisonment of leading Protestants, ostensibly for their protection. That first night violence broke out and one of the three remaining pastors was killed. The incidents remained relatively contained.

The following day the governor ordered all Protestants to gather under his custody for secure imprisonment by royal troops rather than the urban militia. They were confined in the Cordeliers, Célestins, Roanne palace, and the archiepiscopal prisons on 30 August. Some pillaging and destruction occurred, but violence was limited. On the 31st the governor summoned Lyonnais nobility for assistance; troops arrived late.

For several days radical Catholics incited the populace by claiming that the king had accepted the "purificatory" massacre in Paris and would therefore endorse similar action in Lyon. On the morning of the 31st—with the governor absent suppressing unrest in Guillotière—two consuls, André Mornieu and Guillaume Rouillé, led a procession accompanied by the captain of the militia arquebusiers. At the archiepiscopal prison they conducted sham trials, forcing conversions; those who refused were killed on the spot. Systematic violence moved from prison to prison over that day and the next two. During the first two days (31 August–1 September) the killings were ritualistic: bodies were stabbed by crowds, dismembered, and thrown into the river. The mob regarded the acts as divine justice approved by the king. From 2–4 September the murders became less spontaneous.

The number of dead is unknown but probably ran into the hundreds; with forced conversions, disappearances, and flight, Lyonnais Protestantism was effectively destroyed. All social strata were affected, and the city became an intransigent Catholic stronghold.

=== Lyon during the Catholic League ===
==== Lyon distances itself from the king: 1575–1588 ====
After the 1572 massacres rendered Lyon firmly Catholic, the city displayed no early signs of the ultra-Catholic militancy that would characterize the League. While radical Catholic rebellion began in Paris as early as 1584, the first clear evidence in Lyon dates only to 1588.

Locally, the slide into League allegiance stemmed primarily from royal pressure on the city corporation, above all the military distrust symbolised by the Saint-Sébastien citadel. Officially built to protect Lyon from a Protestant coup, everyone understood it was intended to keep the city under surveillance. After the 1572 "Lyonnais vespers," that justification collapsed, and repeated delegations begged the king to demolish it — without success.

In 1585, royal favorite Jean Louis de Nogaret de La Valette, Duke of Épernon purchased the governorship of the fortress and installed his appointee, the sieur du Passage. The latter behaved with open independence toward the king's lieutenant-general in the Lyonnais, François de Mandelot. Consulate and Mandelot joined forces, raised troops, and seized the citadel on 2 May 1585 while arresting du Passage in the city itself. A delegation then demanded once more that Henry III destroy the now-royal-controlled stronghold. The king agreed in exchange for 40,000 écus compensation; the demolition took place amid general rejoicing.

This action demonstrated Lyon's willingness to oppose the sovereign militarily if necessary. At the same time, League ideas circulated ever more widely. Recurrent plague and grain shortages kept the populace agitated while Archbishop Pierre d'Épinac and Governor Mandelot, with consulate support, formed a sworn armed association against Protestants — and against overly moderate Catholics, especially Épernon. Radical sentiment was further revealed in the city's 1588 cahier de doléances sent to the Estates-General at Blois, which closely echoed the extremist positions of Paris.

==== Lyon as a League city: 1588–1594 ====
Like many French cities, Lyon joined the League after the assassination of Henry, Duke of Guise and his brother Cardinal Louis de Lorraine at Blois on 23 December 1588.

Anger increased when the king imprisoned both the archbishop and Governor Mandelot. Hesitation ended when rumour spread that Épernon was marching on Lyon with an army. The consulate mobilized the pennonage militia and put the city on war footing. On 25 February 1589 it declared that the murder of the Guises released Lyon from allegiance to a regicide king and demanded Henry III dismiss his advisers and adopt uncompromising Catholic policy.

On 2 March 1589 the municipal authorities swore allegiance to the Holy League. Royalist partisans were exiled and a dual military–civilian government was established: the consulate assisted by a Council of the Holy Union, flanked by Archbishop Pierre d'Épinac and the new governor, Charles-Emmanuel de Savoie-Nemours (half-brother of the archbishop).

The political upheaval produced considerable intellectual activity. Scholars published treatises and placards justifying or condemning the act of deposing a king for religious reasons. Between 1589 and 1590 Lyon's presses issued more than 280 works on the subject, the most prominent authors being Pierre Matthieu, Claude de Rubys and André de Rossant.

The alliance quickly fractured over divergent interests. Nemours, closely tied to the House of Savoy, pursued a separatist project aimed at annexation by his cousin Charles Emmanuel I of Savoy. In April 1589 he reformed city government to favor his noble allies. Archbishop and consulate drew together, unwilling to embark on a Savoyard adventure. The League regime imposed heavy taxation to finance war against Henry III (now Henry IV after 1589). Coming when Lyon was already impoverished by decades of religious conflict, these levies encouraged royalist subversion and alienated local power centers. Nemours even contemplated creating his own principality from Lyonnais, Forez, Beaujolais, Auvergne, Bourbonnais and La Marche. On 21 September 1593 an insurrection led by the consulate expelled Charles-Emmanuel de Savoie-Nemours. No League leaders were executed, but more than sixty ringleaders were banished.

=== Financial difficulties and institutional disorder ===
Caught between collapsing fair revenues and heavy military expenditure, the city's finances collapsed. For 1594 alone, Henri Hours records a debt exceeding 630,000 écus — only Paris and Marseille were more indebted in France at that time. One symptom was the proliferation of low-denomination counterfeit or debased coinage that authorities struggled to suppress. To sustain such debt, consuls were forced to assume ever-larger personal shares, passing the burden to successors and making it difficult to find candidates willing to serve. This partly explained the distortion of normal consular elections: in the absence of volunteers, outgoing consuls were simply re-elected year after year, breaking centuries-old custom.

== Economy ==
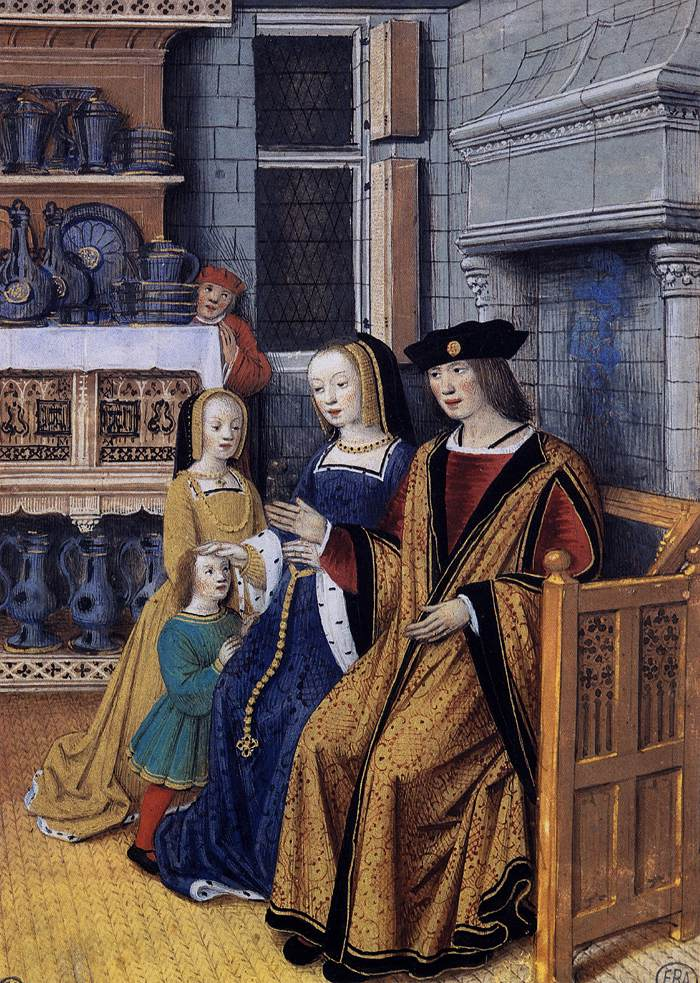
The Wealthy Man, Jean Bourdichon, c. 1500–1510, École nationale supérieure des beaux-arts, Paris.

During the Renaissance, Lyon found itself at the heart of the first wave of globalization, propelled by two converging phenomena: the reconfiguration of European trade in the 15th century and the establishment of the famous Lyon fairs.

At the end of the Hundred Years' War, north-western Europe, including France, lay exhausted by continual warfare and heavy taxation. From the early 15th century onward, the axis stretching from Swabia to northern Italy profited from its rivals' weakness and enjoyed sustained economic growth. This route was paralleled by another major trade corridor running from north-eastern Europe to the Iberian Peninsula, benefiting German and northern Italian cities alike. When the Kingdom of France recovered after several decades of relative peace around 1450, Lyon emerged at the center of a new economic space.

This space became polarised along the Rhône and Saône valleys once the fairs established by Charles VII in 1420 gained momentum after mid-century. From the 1460s they experienced rapid success, transforming Lyon from a modest frontier town of little importance into one of Europe's leading economic centers for more than a century.

For Lyon, the four annual fairs were a major source of revenue. The city participated fully in the major European trade currents and benefited from the near-absence of guilds: most trades were practiced freely, without restrictive regulations. This environment allowed industries—above all printing and textiles—to develop very rapidly.

=== The fairs and long-distance trade ===
Lyon owed its considerable prosperity and full participation in the Renaissance to its fairs, which quickly attracted merchants and bankers from across Europe.

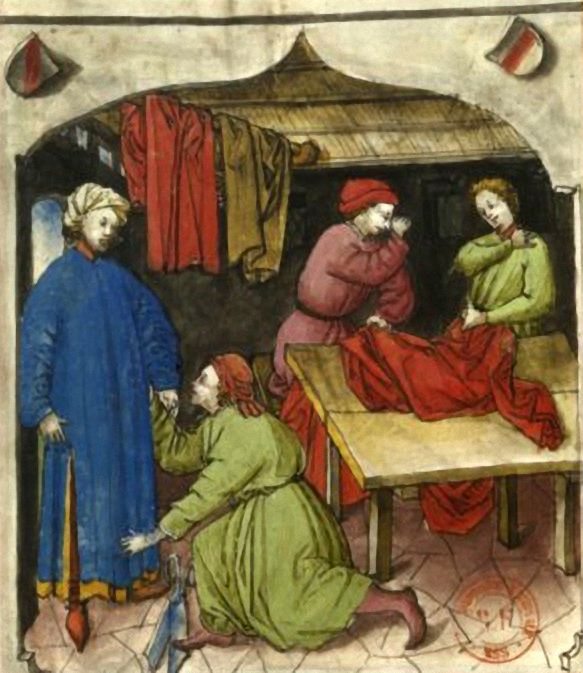
Wool merchants. Tacuinum sanitatis.

==== Creation and early difficulties ====
The two annual fairs created in 1422 had been suspended in 1429 because of marauding Écorcheurs, but were revived in 1444. The following year Charles VII added a third and forbade French merchants from trading at Geneva in order to favor Lyon's growth. Immediately after his accession, Louis XI confirmed the privileges on 7 October 1461. Foreign and French merchants had enjoyed tax exemption at the fairs since 1420.

Letters patent of 8 March 1463 authorized a fourth fifteen-day fair, accompanying the fairs' rapid expansion. They now lasted sixty days per year instead of nine.

Paradoxically, the fairs were threatened by French goods themselves. On 20 October 1470 Louis XI convened representatives of the kingdom's merchant cities at Tours to curb the outflow of bullion, since large quantities of foreign merchandise entered France via Lyon. When attempts at Caen and Rouen failed, the merchants asked the king to suppress the Lyon fairs in favor of Norman ones. Louis XI refused and upheld Lyonnais rights.

Other powers also tried to undermine Lyon. The Burgundian-controlled fairs at Chalon-sur-Saône were one rival; in Savoy, Amédée IX forbade merchants to attend Lyon on 25 September 1465 in retaliation for Louis XI's ban on Geneva. Conferences at Montluel in 1467 eventually granted two fairs per year to each city on staggered dates, provoking outrage in Lyon. On 14 November 1467 Louis XI annulled the agreement and restored Lyon's four fairs.

The death of Charles the Bold in 1477 significantly changed the competitive landscape. As Geneva's fairs declined (burdened by heavy fines owed to the Swiss), Lyon's expanded considerably, becoming one of Europe's principal commercial and financial centers. After 1494 the fairs' existence was never again seriously challenged.

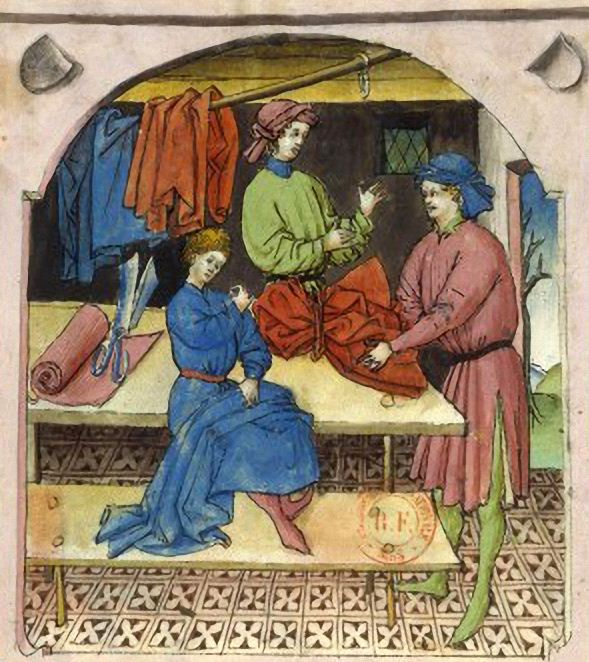
Silk merchants. Tacuinum sanitatis.

==== Organization ====
The four fairs opened on the first Monday after Epiphany (Foire des Rois), the Sunday after Quasimodo (Easter fair), 4 August, and 3 November (All Saints' fair). Each lasted fifteen days, during which no cash changed hands; merchants simply recorded agreements in ledgers.

Payments followed in three stages. First, merchants met under the leadership of the Florentine nation's consul to accept or protest previous deals. Two to four days later came the "exchange" phase, fixing payment dates, interest rates, and foreign-exchange rates. Three days after that, final settlement occurred in cash, specie, or bills of exchange. Many merchants cleared debts by offsetting them against others present, a system close to modern clearing.

==== Location ====
Early on, the consulate tried alternating fairs between the "kingdom" (right) and "empire" (left) banks of the Saône, but Louis XI eventually ordered merchants left free to gather where they wished. The whole city became a vast European marketplace, with traders grouping by nationality or affinity.

Fairs spilled across shops, streets, trestles, and the ground, centered on the Saône bridge. On the kingdom side they stretched from the Juiverie quarter to Place de Roanne; on the empire side from Place de l'Herberie (modern Place d'Albon) via Rue Saint-Éloi, Rue Mercière, and the quarters of Platière, Grenette, Saint-Antoine, and Cordeliers to the Rhône. Over time they extended to Place du Confort and Les Terreaux.

Merchants also rented street-front shops, which doubled as warehouses. Specific trades gradually clustered: furriers first in Rue Juiverie, later at Grenette and Cordeliers; haberdashery near Saint-Nizier and on the bridge; hardware at Place du Confort.

==== Goods traded ====
At its economic zenith Lyon handled a large volume of art objects. The city was "the most important marketplace for works of art, precisely because of the large presence of Italian trading companies" ("le plus important marché d'œuvres d'art, précisément à cause de la forte présence des compagnies commerciales italiennes"). The Lyonnais branch of the Capponi family supplied marble statues to Constable Anne de Montmorency, sculptures for the villa of Beauregard, and a marble fountain to Anne de Beaujeu.

===== Lyonnais merchants =====
Lyonnais merchants actively participated by travelling abroad. Several families sent agents to Genoa to sell English or Flemish cloth and local products while importing silk. They never formed a formal "nation" in Genoa (unlike foreigners in Lyon) and suffered when French kings expelled Genoese merchants during conflicts, though they successfully resisted Genoese taxation attempts such as the Drictus Sabaudie (1508–1511).

Many Lyonnais families—Camus, Faure, Malezieu—built the foundations of an active early capitalism.

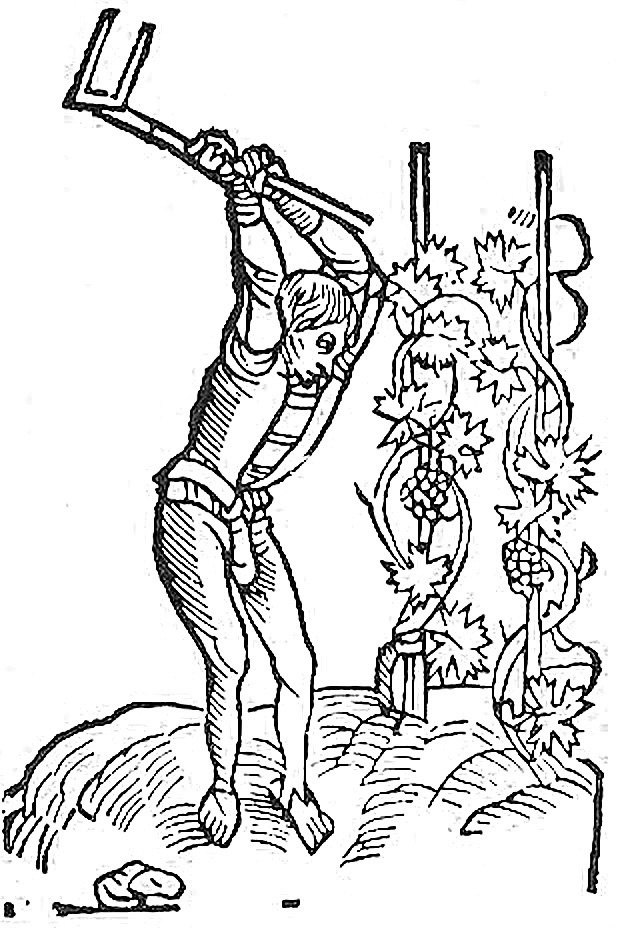
Tending vines. Woodcuts from Petra de Crescentia commodorum ruralium Opus libri XII, Speyer, 1493.

=== Landownership by the Lyonnais bourgeoisie ===
Enriched Lyonnais bourgeois became substantial landowners, strengthening their social position at the expense of traditional lords (archbishops and canons).

The 1493 nommées (tax rolls) showed 849 taxpayers owning c. 1,900 hectares outside the city, concentrated west of Lyon along the rivers (Vaise to Millery), with significant holdings in the hills of Tarare, Jarez, and the slopes of Pilat. The figures are certainly understated, as the rolls omitted the Monts d'Or and the Irigny–Vernaison area where Lyonnais elites had long been heavily implanted.

Vineyards accounted for 55% of rural investment; the wealthiest concentrated on livestock. During crises, bourgeois lent money to village communities, bought produce, and invested in mills, irrigation, and buildings, especially in the second half of the 15th century. Many also purchased simple annuities or rents in kind, which became commonplace during the Renaissance.

=== Silk in Lyon ===
Silk manufacturing appeared in Lyon during the Renaissance. Favored by the fairs, entrepreneurial freedom, and frequent royal presence, the industry grew rapidly, reaching a period of prosperity under Henry II before suffering a severe crisis during the Wars of Religion.

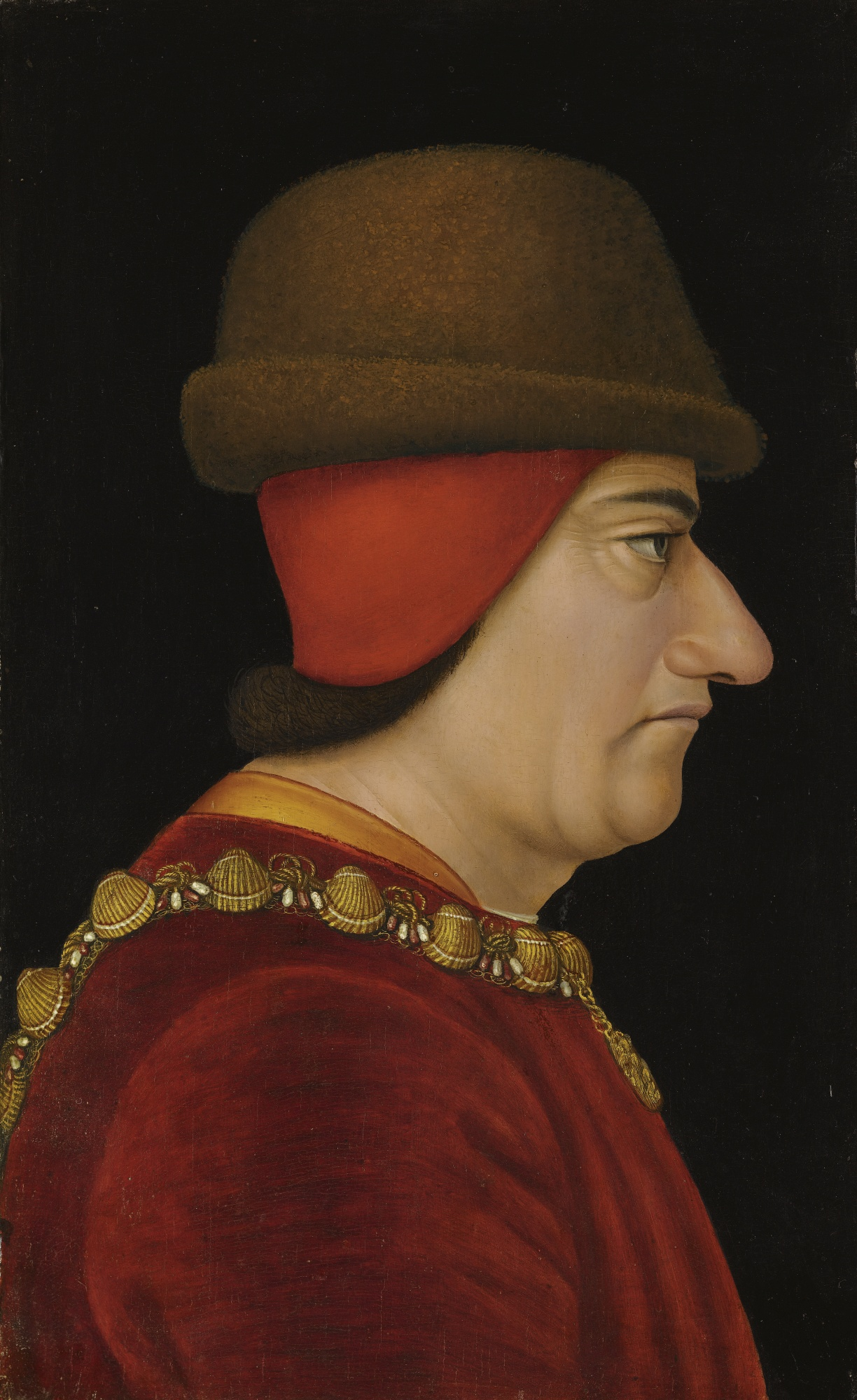
Louis XI, who attempted to implant silk production in Lyon. Brooklyn Museum, New York.

==== An aborted first attempt ====
The initiative came from Louis XI's desire to stop the outflow of gold caused by the French nobility's passion for expensive imported (mostly Italian) silk. Letters patent of 23 November 1466 and requests for funding followed in December 1466. A few artisans were brought in, but Lyonnais merchants—fearing to offend Italian partners and drive them to rival Geneva—dragged their feet. The workshops were eventually transferred to Tours in 1470.

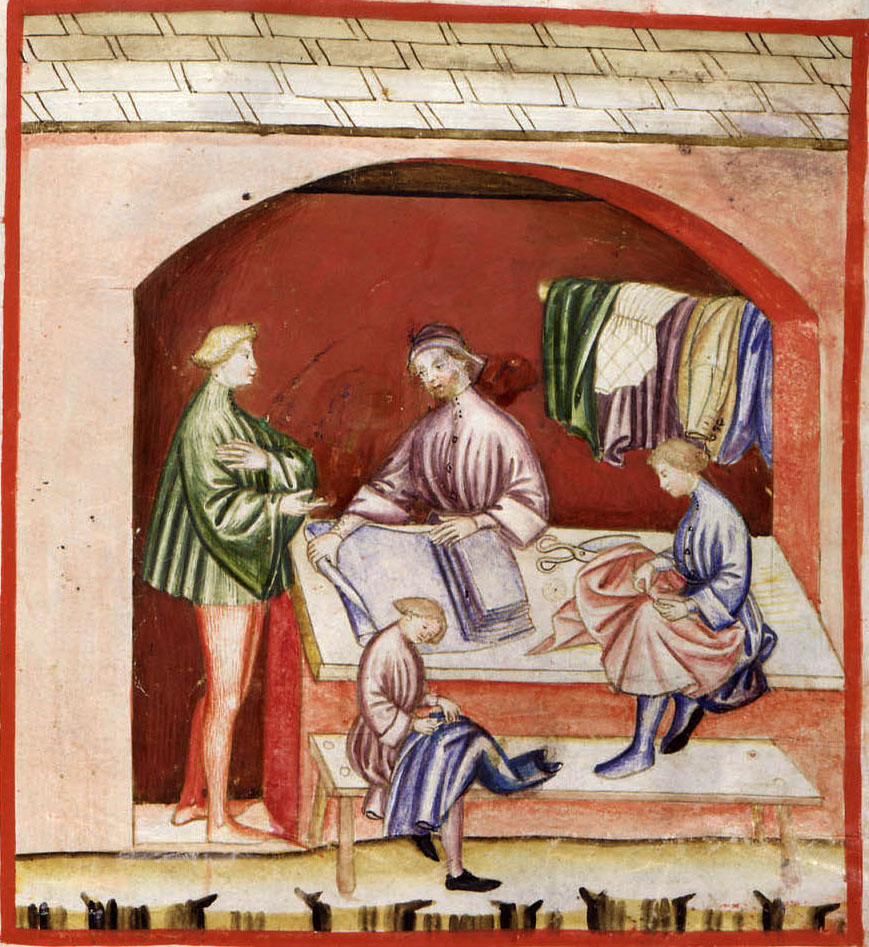
Silk merchants. Tacuinum sanitatis.

==== Étienne Turquet and the true birth of Lyonnais silk ====
The successful establishment came with Piedmontese Étienne Turquet and Bartholomé Naris, who obtained royal privilege in October 1536 under Francis I to manufacture cloth of gold, silver, and silk. The consulate actively supported the project, providing premises and cheap labor from charitable institutions. Raw silk duties were lifted, and foreign workers were exempted from taxes.

==== The first golden age of Lyonnais silk ====
Success was rapid. By Henry II's 1548 entry, 459 master weavers paraded; 800–1,000 people lived from silk. Production focused on plain fabrics (satin, taffeta, velvet, cloth of gold/silver); patterned silks remained an Italian monopoly until c. 1600.

Silk dominated the fairs: in 1569 it accounted for over half the total value of goods traded.

Charles IX, whose policies precipitated the crisis. François Clouet, Kunsthistorisches Museum.

==== 1560–1590: the first silk crisis ====
The Protestant occupation of 1562–1563 triggered an initial shock, followed by plague and, crucially, Charles IX's 50% duty on raw-silk imports. Lyonnais silk lost competitiveness against cheaper (often smuggled) foreign production. Rival cities (Geneva, Besançon, Turin, Milan, etc.) attracted unemployed Lyonnais workers. Loom numbers collapsed from c. 3,000 in the late 1550s to roughly 200 in the 1570s.

=== The art of the book in Lyon ===
During the Renaissance, Lyon ranked among Europe's leading centers of book production. Together with Paris it accounted for roughly 90% of all books printed in France in 1530. Originating with German typographers, the trade was quickly taken over by local craftsmen supported by merchants who quickly adopted the new technology. At its peak Lyon had dozens of printers and booksellers and participated fully in the major intellectual currents of the age. Although printing suffered severely in the economic crisis of the later 16th century, bookselling families generally weathered the storm.

Map of the principal centers of early printing, by chronological order and importance.

==== Origins of printing in Lyon ====
The first book printed in Lyon was produced in 1473 by Guillaume Le Roy (German: Wilhelm König) in the workshop of the Lyonnais merchant Barthélemy Buyer, who had brought him from Liège. Buyer developed the business, targeting two markets: jurists (with heavy legal tomes) and cultured elites with religious works, chivalric romances, practical medicine, and vernacular texts. He opened branches in several French cities and exported to Italy and Spain, contributing to Lyon's later success in printing.

From the outset the Lyonnais printing milieu was highly cosmopolitan. The fairs and tax exemption until 1495 attracted foreigners, especially Germans and French provincials; few native Lyonnais appeared in the earliest decades.

==== Characteristics of Lyonnais publishing ====
Lyon became a major European printing center. The fairs provided both capital and markets, while the initially loose organization of the trade kept labor costs moderate. German, Venetian, and Florentine printers settled mainly in Rue Mercière and the Saint-Nizier quarter.

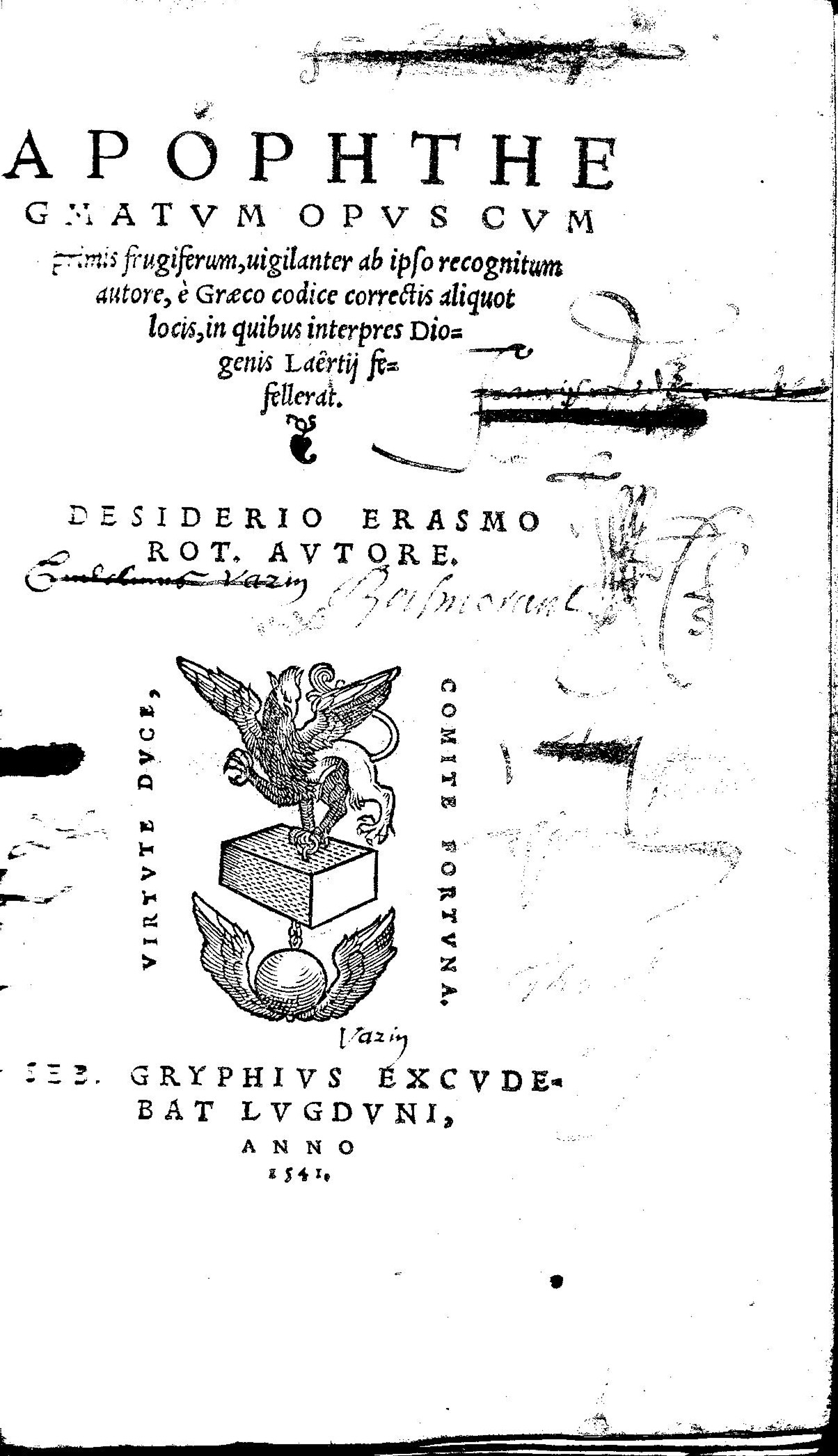
Apophthegmatum, Erasmus, Lyon edition by Sébastien Gryphe.

The Lyonnais book world was strongly influenced by Venice, especially by Aldus Manutius. Italian humanism and typographic innovations such as italic spread quickly. Leading humanist printers included Sébastien Gryphe, François Juste, Étienne Dolet, and Jean de Tournes. Italian printers such as Giacomo Giunti, Vincenzo Portinari, and Barthassard de Gabiano also established themselves, publishing mainly fellow countrymen.

Within France only Paris rivalled Lyon's output. Paris specialized more in liturgical books and books of hours, but the two cities were closely linked from the start, with no strict specialization. A notable example is Josse Bade, who began as a corrector in Lyon before founding his own press in Paris.

From about a dozen workshops in 1480, Lyon grew to around a hundred by the mid-16th century, supplying an international market aimed chiefly at Spain and Italy. Printers were often scholar-printers who published medicine, romances, and humanist texts alongside the usual religious works; the French Golden Legend appeared as early as 1476.

Most bookseller-publishers did not own presses but commissioned printers. Early on, booksellers were predominantly Italian and printers German, but unlike the great Italian banking dynasties most integrated fully into Lyonnais society.

The most famous was Sébastien Gryphe from Swabia, who produced over a thousand editions and founded a printing dynasty. He trained Étienne Dolet and published Budé, Scaliger, and Politian.

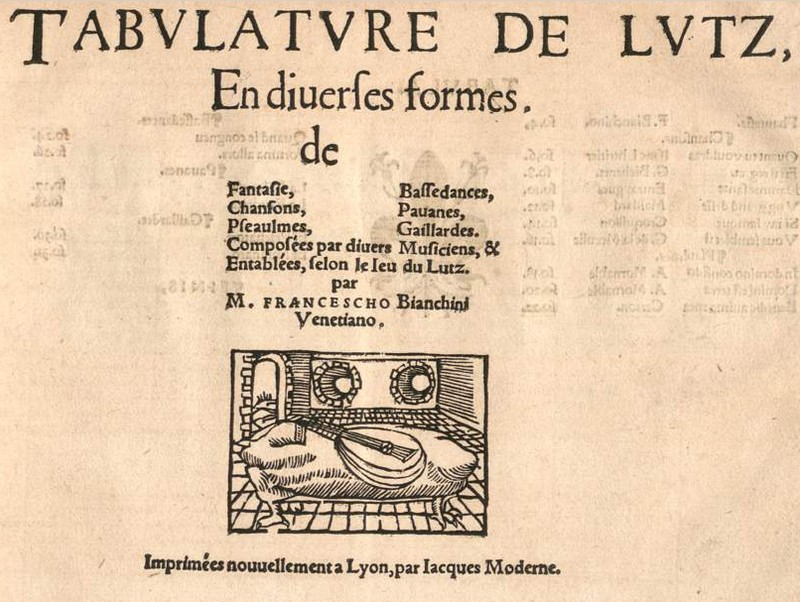
Title page of Francesco Bianchini's lute tablature, printed by Jacques Moderne, 1547.

===== Music printing =====
Between roughly 1525–1580 Lyon was a major center of music printing, producing sacred, spiritual (including Protestant), and secular music. The leading figure was Jacques Moderne, whose collections such as Motetti del Fiore and Parangon des chansons circulated widely. He was followed by the Beringen brothers, Simon Gorlier, Robert Granjon, Jean de Tournes II, and others. Music printing disappeared from Lyon after c. 1615, ceding entirely to Paris.

==== The book trades ====
Renaissance printing required many specialized crafts: type-founders, papermakers (most paper came from Auvergne or Dauphiné), ink-makers, etchers, engravers, and binders. The number of illuminators dwindled, reflecting the shift to printed decoration. In 1545 Lyon had 22 playing-card makers alongside sixty printers and twenty-nine booksellers, evidence of the vogue for cards.

===== Illumination: the end of an era =====
Illumination declined during the Renaissance and disappeared around 1530. The last major practitioners were the Master of the Alarmes de Mars, the Master of François I's Entry, and Guillaume II Le Roy, active 1493–1528, who also painted royal entries.

==== The Wars of Religion and the crisis of the book trade ====
The religious wars severely damaged Lyon's economy and book trade. Many printers and booksellers emigrated, often to Geneva, in waves (1551 and especially 1567). Geneva offered cheaper provisions and better regulation. Booksellers fared better by having books printed there, but printers collapsed from 63 masters in 1545 to 13 in 1571.

=== Banking ===
With the growth of the fairs Lyon became a leading European banking center. From 1466 major Italian houses relocated there: Medici, Bonvisi, Bene, Gondi, Capponi, Salviati, Guadagni (Gadagne). The Gadagne was the largest in the early 16th century, lending heavily to Francis I for the Italian Wars, until absorbed by Capponi in 1556. By 1597 only twenty-one Italian banking houses remained, down from seventy-five in 1568. Lyonnais merchants also financed early capitalism, notably the pastel boom in Toulouse.

=== Other sectors ===
Food trades expanded with population growth; the consulate regulated grain, created public reserves (1549), and moved livestock markets for hygiene. Wine consumption reached approximately 150,000 hectoliters annually.

=== End of Lyon's prosperity ===
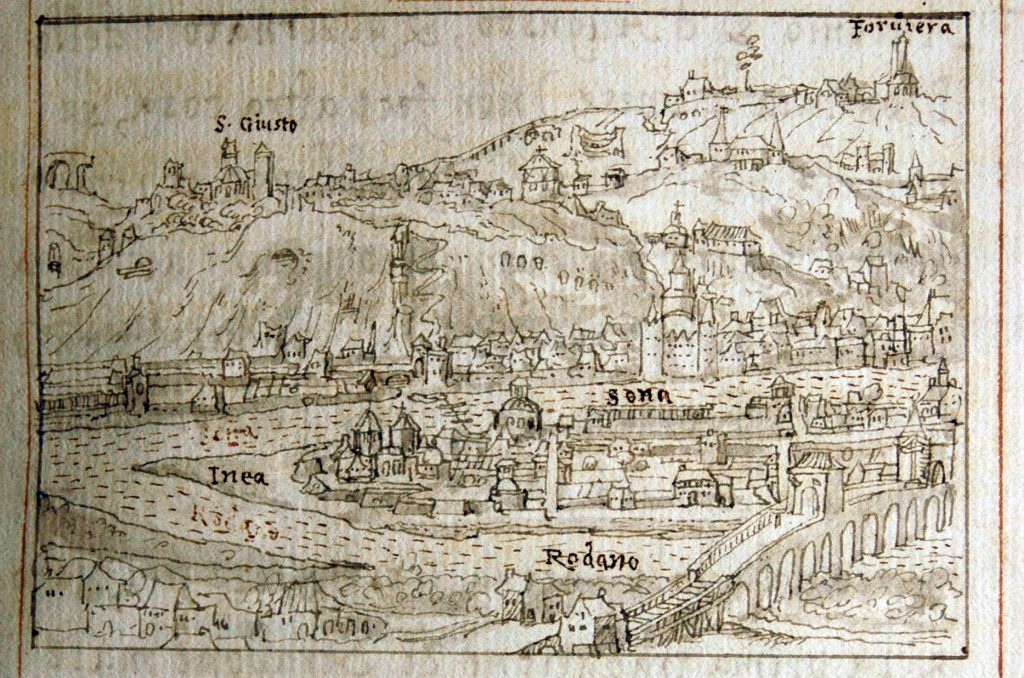
View of Lyon by Gabriele Simeoni, 1559.

Lyon's Renaissance period of prosperity ended in the late 16th century. Long-distance trade and banking collapsed between the 1570s and 1590s, accelerated by the 1557 bankruptcy of the Grand Parti de Lyon, the displacement of the fairs during the 1562 Protestant occupation, plague outbreaks in 1564, and general insecurity. The crisis in Antwerp and Philip II's 1557 default further compounded these difficulties.

A major contributing factor was the northward shift of European trade toward England and the Netherlands, along with the development of new Atlantic routes that bypassed Lyon. Many Italian merchant-bankers left the city; local families did not fully replace them, often preferring public offices or investment in rents. The crown provided no sustained fiscal support, and commerce was generally accorded lower social prestige in French society.

Two legacies remained: the fairs continued to play an important role in domestic French trade, and silk manufacturing, introduced in the 1530s, became the city's primary source of economic growth from the early 17th century.

== Knowledge and culture ==
Lyon, during the first half of the 16th century, benefited from a combination of factors that contributed to its prominence in Renaissance humanism in Europe. At that time the city served as France's second capital, with French kings residing there frequently while attending to the Italian Wars. This royal presence supported an existing circle of scholars and poets that included Symphorien Champier, Maurice Scève, and Louise Labé, and attracted courtiers and intellectuals such as the German scholar Cornelius Agrippa, who served as personal physician to Louise of Savoy. The prosperous economy provided support for visiting scholars. The absence of a parliament or university allowed considerable intellectual freedom. In this frontier city, with a strong presence of booksellers, new ideas could be proposed and disseminated more readily than in many other places. Bookselling was the primary means of disseminating Renaissance culture in Lyon. Artistic production, unlike literature, has left few traces, many of which were destroyed by Protestant iconoclasm. Although foreigners commissioned works, the Lyonnais bourgeoisie commissioned few ostentatious pieces.

=== Foundations of Lyonnais culture ===
As a frontier city, Lyon developed a culture shaped by its position between several worlds. Lyon lay on the linguistic boundary between Franco-Provençal and langue d'oïl. Throughout the 15th century its elites sought to adopt the culture of their king while continuing to speak the local dialect in daily life. Only around 1460 did official documents begin to be drafted entirely in standard northern French. Despite linguistic assimilation through education, the elites retained a strong local cultural identity, particularly as exchanges with Geneva intensified.

==== Education ====
Sources on education in Renaissance Lyon are extremely sparse until the early 16th century. Consular deliberations are almost silent on the subject, tax rolls uninformative, and notarial registers non-existent before 1530. Reconstruction relies on comparison with nearby cities such as Bourg-en-Bresse, Grenoble, and Vienne. In the first half of the 15th century instruction for patrician sons was limited to reading, arithmetic, and basic rhetoric. From the 1460s the situation evolved rapidly: Lyon's growing wealth and network of booksellers attracted qualified teachers (Henri Valluphin, Jean Delorme, Guillaume Ramène, Josse Bade); bourgeois prosperity supported stable schools; civic pride ("the honor of the city") encouraged municipal funding; and humanist and reformist ideals promoted education as the means to regenerate Christian society. By the height of the Renaissance Lyonnais elites had access to every type of school found in major European cities except a university. The most notable institution was the Collège de la Trinité, founded in 1519 by the Confrérie de la Trinité and installed on Rue Neuve. Basic instruction was provided by parish and collegiate churches (e.g. the manécanterie of Saint-Jean). Wealthier families sent children to grammar or law schools or hired private tutors; the richest dispatched sons to prestigious universities.

==== Festivities and royal entries ====
In the Renaissance urban elites increasingly sought to distinguish themselves from the populace while presenting increasingly elaborate public displays. Collective festivals became spectacles performed by the bourgeoisie for a passive audience. During mid-16th-century Carnival, wealthy (often Italian) families organized "mommeryes"—lavish processions drawing on classical mythology followed by ring-jousts among notables.

=== Lyonnais humanism and intellectual life ===
Lyonnais intellectual life revolved around informal circles of printers, travellers attending the fairs, and members of the royal court.

==== Fertile ground for humanism ====
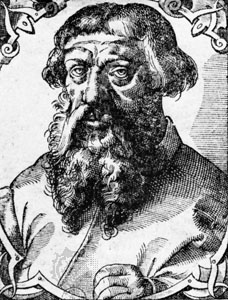
Étienne Dolet, 16th-century engraving.

The absence of a university meant printers and scholars worked free from doctrinal oversight. Royal censorship proved impractical given the volume of publications. The early Renaissance archbishop Charles II de Bourbon was an open-minded patron of learning.

==== Cultural circles ====
Cultural life centered on salons hosted by wealthy scholars (Pierre Sala, Symphorien Champier, Guillaume du Choul, Guillaume Scève, Marie-Catherine Pierrevive), printers' workshops (Sébastien Gryphe, Jean de Tournes), and the progressive Collège de la Trinité.

The informal "sodalitium" included passing luminaries such as François Rabelais, Étienne Dolet, Clément Marot, Bonaventure Des Périers, and the brothers Jean and Mathieu de Vauzelles.

Salons included Pierre Sala's gatherings at the Antiquaille (modelled on the Medici academy at Careggi) and Marie-Catherine Pierrevive's salon at the château du Grand-Perron (1520s–1530s), frequented by Dolet, Des Périers, Scève, and others.

=== Literature ===
Renaissance Lyon produced an original literary current, free from Parisian censorship and nourished by Italian, classical, and medieval traditions.

Two generations are distinguishable:

- c. 1500: Symphorien Champier and Pierre Sala (the "Académie de Fourvière")
- 1530s peak: Maurice Scève, Louise Labé, Pernette du Guillet, and the anonymous author of the Contes amoureux de Madame Jeanne Flore—known as the Lyonnais school of poetry

The school's love poetry, blending Petrarchism and Neoplatonism, played a pioneering role alongside the Pléiade in the French literary renaissance.

=== Music ===
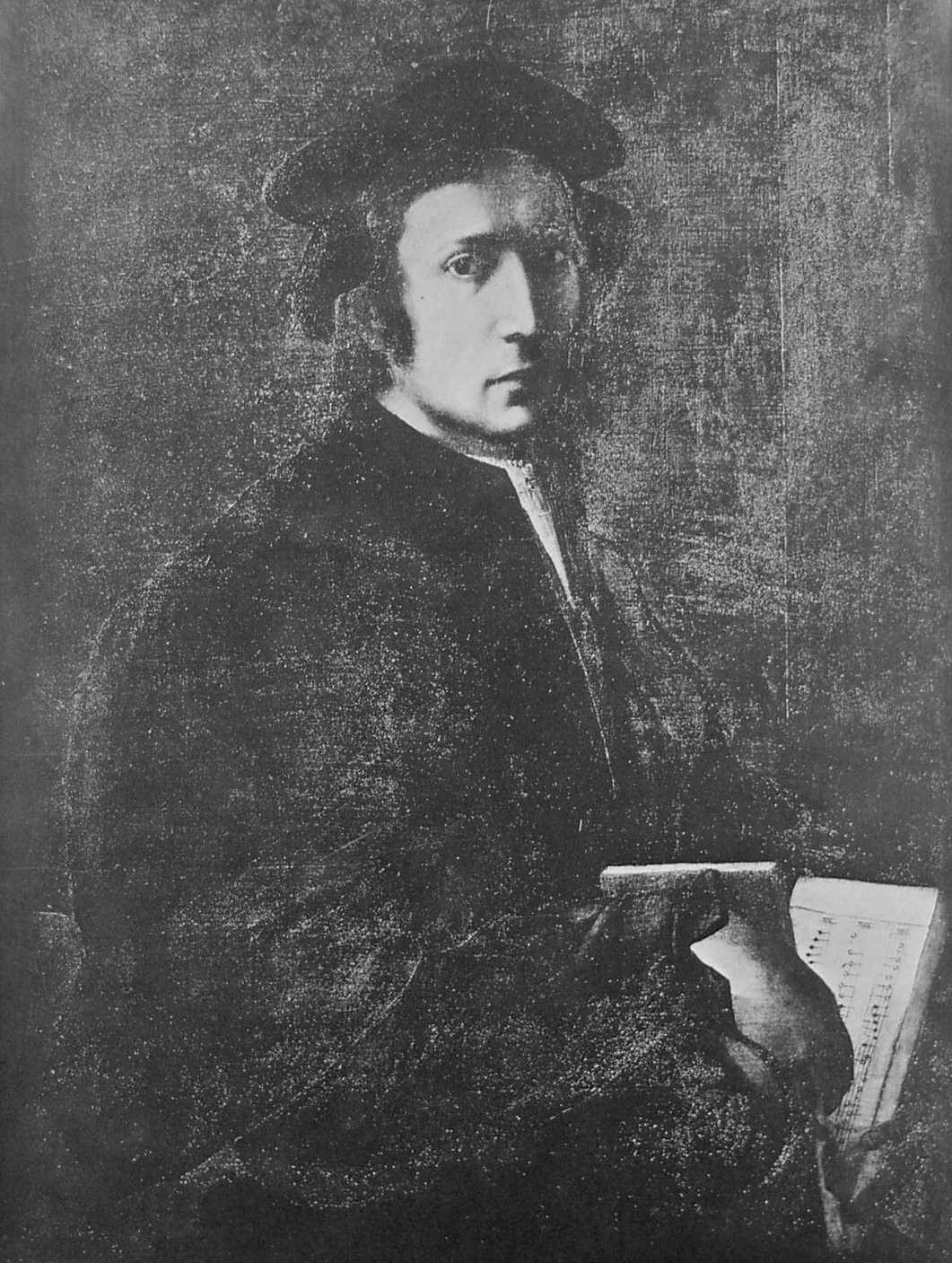
Presumed portrait of Francesco de Layolle by Jacopo Pontormo (1518).

The musical life of Renaissance Lyon remains difficult to quantify and appears more limited than its literary culture or the musical scenes of Paris and the major Italian cities. Frank Dobbins has identified around 150 musicians active in Lyon during the entire 16th century, many of them amateurs and very few publishing their own compositions. Some also worked as instrument makers. The best-known include Guillaume de La Moëlle, Louis Bourgeois, Pierre de Villiers, Philibert Jambe de Fer, Francesco Layolle and his son Alamanno, Eustorg de Beaulieu, François Roussel, Simon Gorlier, and Didier Lupi Second.

These musicians were paid by the consulate or wealthy merchants to perform at civic festivities and royal entries, or to give lessons to affluent families; they usually acknowledged their patrons in printed dedications. Many spent only part of their careers in Lyon, their presence attested solely by the publication of one or more music books.

Church music appears to have been conservative: the canons of Saint-Jean insisted on plainchant and resisted polyphony; almost nothing is known of musical activity in parish churches or collegiate chapels. The only probable exception was the Florentine parish church of Notre-Dame de Confort, where the organist Francesco Layolle collaborated closely with the printer Jacques Moderne.

Lyon was nonetheless an important center of instrument making, especially recorders (Claude Rafi) and lutes (the Tyrolean Gaspard Duiffoprougcar family and their workshop).

=== Painting and printmaking ===
Renaissance painting in Lyon is poorly documented. Although production appears to have been abundant, few works survive, owing to destruction during the 1562 Protestant iconoclasm, shifts in artistic taste, and vandalism during the French Revolution.

As a major commercial, banking, intellectual, and political center, Lyon served as a crossroads for European artistic influences. From the late 15th century, its painters incorporated elements from Flemish, Italian, and residual French Gothic traditions. The principal genres were book illustration, exemplified by Bernard Salomon, and portraiture, dominated by Corneille de Lyon.

==== Official institutions ====
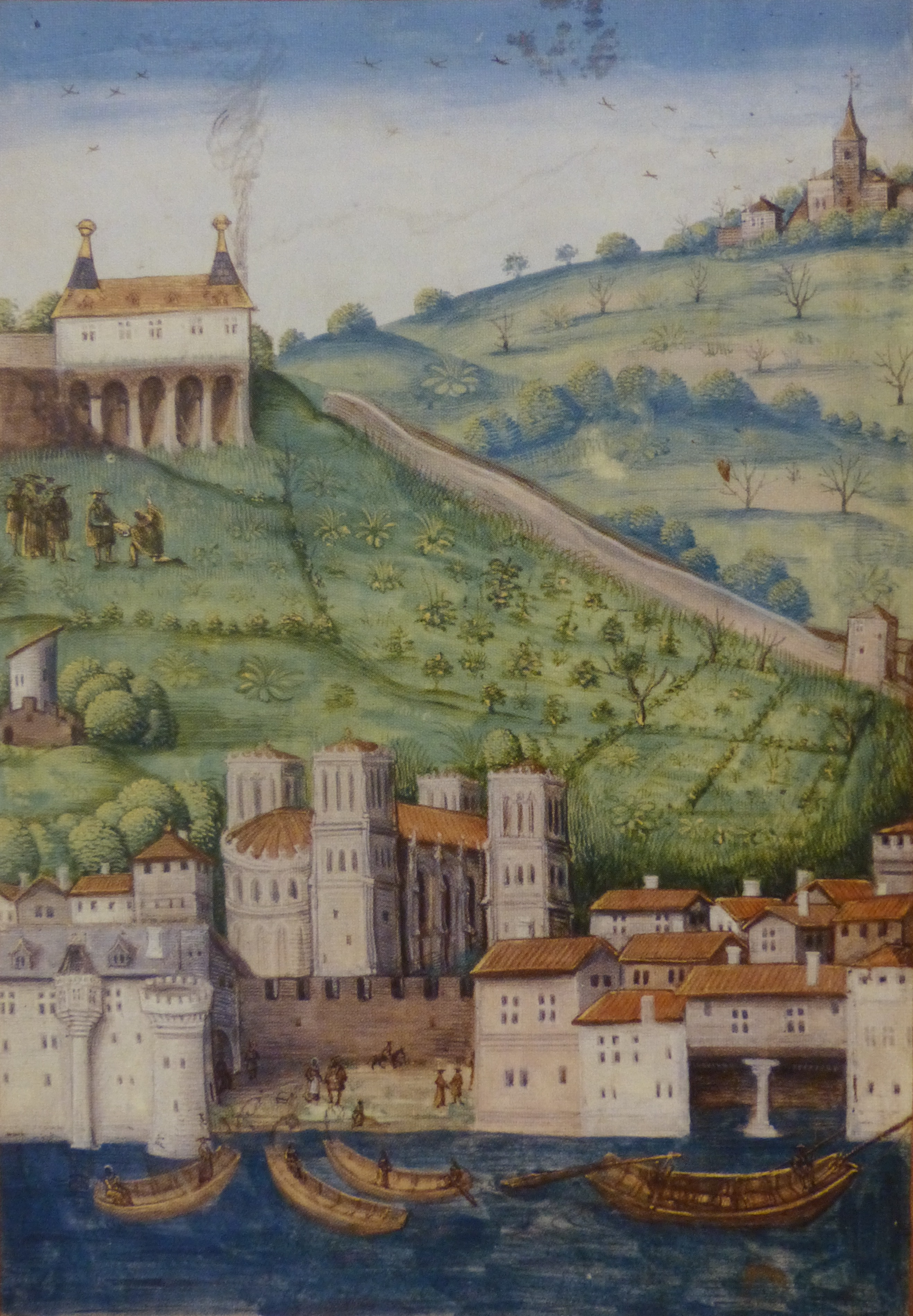
Lyonnais landscape with the residence of Pierre Sala. Illuminated frontispiece of the Prouesses de plusieurs Roys, c. 1523, Bibliothèque nationale de France, Ms. fr. 10420, fol. 1v.

Only two institutions regulated the visual arts: the position of official painter to the cathedral and the painters' guild.

===== Cathedral painter =====
The city's sole official painter position was linked to Saint-Jean. The first holder during the Renaissance was Laurent Girardin (1441–1471), noted for stained-glass windows and a Trinity panel now in Cleveland. His successor (and son-in-law), Jean Prévost (from 1471), undertook varied commissions, including decorations for Louis XI's 1476 entry and paintings for the cathedral clock.

===== Painters', sculptors', engravers', and glass-painters' guild =====
In 1496, Charles VIII approved statutes for the guild, whose founding members included the royal painter Jean Perréal. Few works by these artists survive, except for a Saint Catherine attributed to Claude Guinet.

==== Late 15th century ====
The expansion of mendicant convents and visits by elite patrons stimulated religious commissions. Jean Hey (the Master of Moulins), patronized by Cardinal Charles de Bourbon, worked in Lyon under Louis XI.

==== First half of the 16th century ====
Prominent painters included the Master JG (1520s), Corneille de Lyon (from the 1530s), Bernard Salomon, and Jean Perréal. Book illustration developed a characteristic Lyonnais style through Salomon's intricate woodcuts, which drew on Holbein's techniques and Parisian mannerism. The publisher Jean de Tournes helped spread Salomon's illustrations across Europe. Lyonnais stained-glass painters gained considerable recognition; several worked for the dukes of Savoy at Chambéry.

==== Second half of the 16th century ====
Key figures included Maignan, Perrissin, and the printmaker Pierre Eskrich (Woeiriot), whose output illustrates the effects of the religious wars.

=== Other arts ===
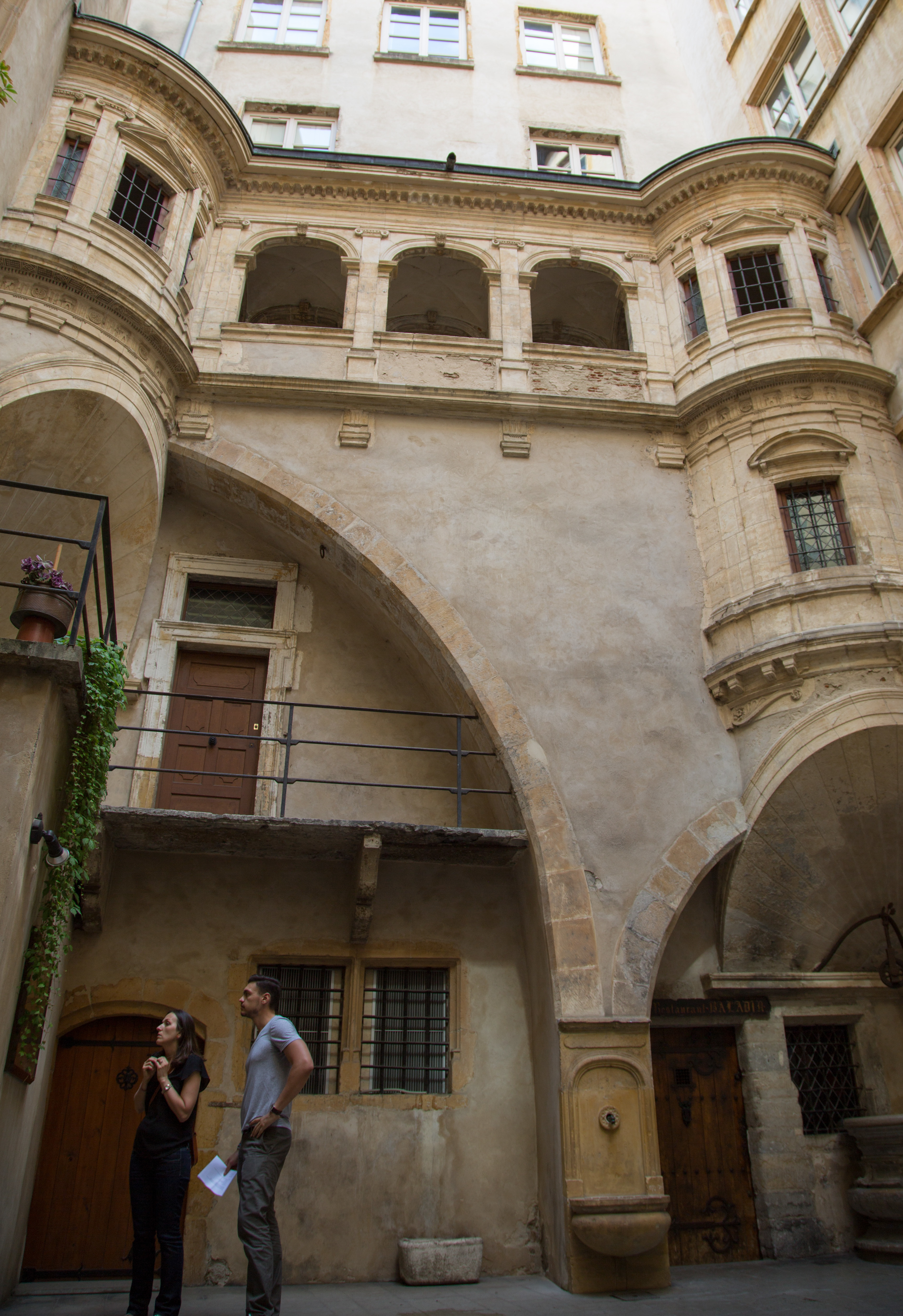
Interior courtyard of the Hôtel de Bullioud, built by Philibert de l’Orme (1536).

==== Architecture ====
Italian Renaissance influences on architecture were limited in Lyon. Wealthy foreign residents typically constructed palaces in their home countries, while local elites favored restrained late-Gothic ornamentation. Surviving Renaissance buildings include the church of Notre-Dame de Confort, the Gondi villas at Grand- and Petit-Perron, the Gadagne villa at Beauregard, and Philibert de l'Orme's gallery at the Hôtel de Bullioud.

Italian architects visited the city: Giuliano da Sangallo and Boccador accompanied Charles VIII, while Sebastiano Serlio resided in Lyon from around 1549 to 1554, where he published several volumes of his treatise (including the Extraordinario Libro, which later shaped local preferences).

==== Sculpture ====
Foreign communities, particularly Florentines, commissioned sculptures for private use and for Notre-Dame de Confort (including mausolea by Antonio Rossellino and others). Thomas I de Gadagne fitted his Beauregard villa with a rustic nymphaeum.

==== Faience ====
Italian potters operated in Lyon from 1512, initially creating pieces similar to those from the Italian peninsula. A recognizably French faience style developed only over time.

== Religion in the Renaissance: decline and renewal ==
During the Renaissance, Lyon was a major European crossroads where almost every spiritual current intersected. From the late-15th-century reconstruction to the Christian humanism of the early 16th century, from the rise of Reformed ideas to the outbreak of the French Wars of Religion, and finally to the Catholic League and subsequent reconciliation, the city experienced every significant religious upheaval of the era.

=== Late 15th century: reconstruction and growth ===
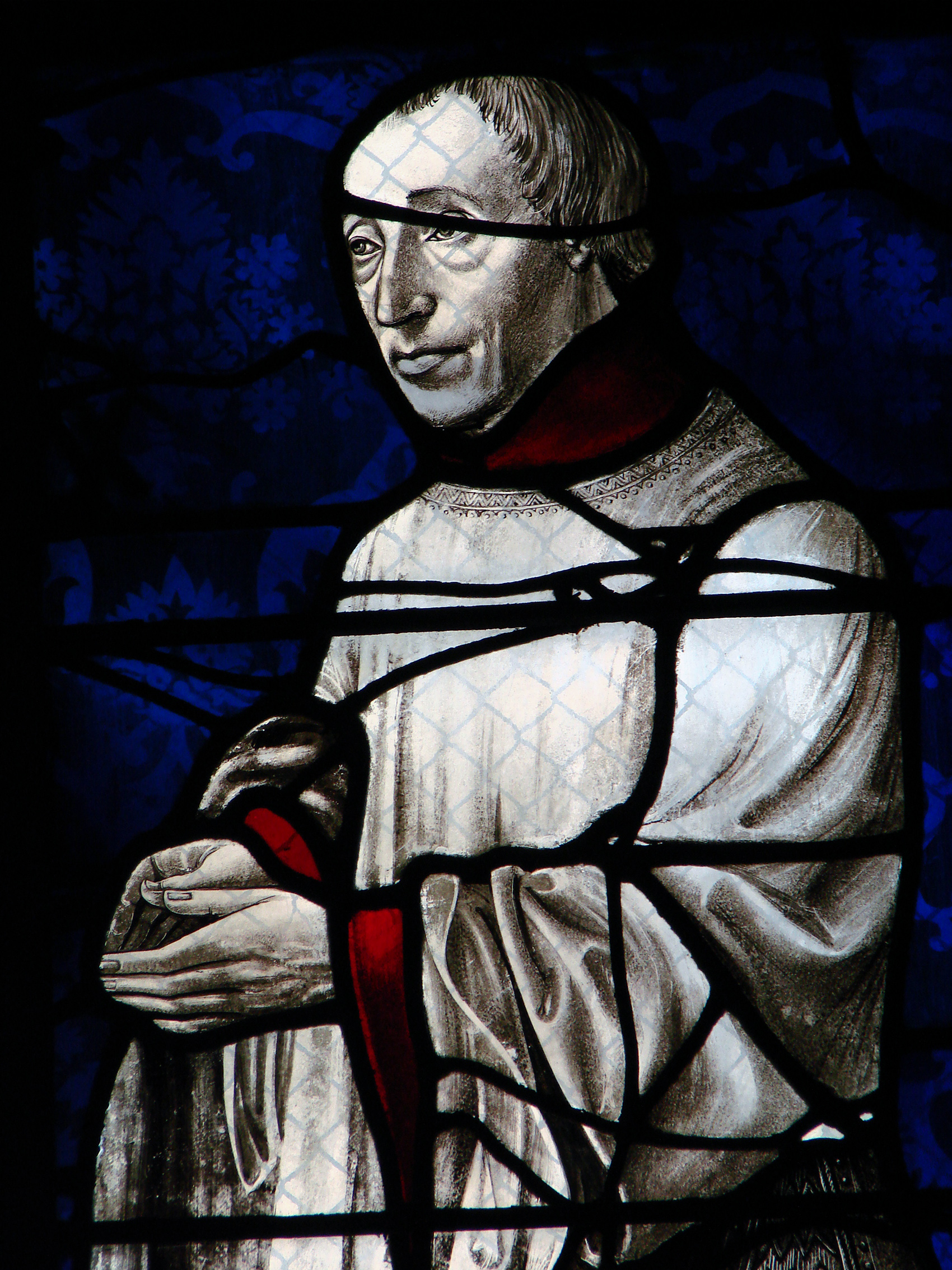
Stained-glass portrait of Cardinal Charles II de Bourbon, Moulins Cathedral.

The late 15th and early 16th centuries were religiously unremarkable periods in Lyon. High church officials, almost always drawn from the nobility and court circles, devoted more attention to royal service than pastoral care. Even before the 1516 Concordat of Bologna formally granted the French king the right to appoint bishops, monarchs had long imposed their choices. Lyonnais archbishops were thus primarily courtiers and diplomats, selected for political utility rather than spiritual leadership. Most held multiple benefices and rarely resided in the diocese.

This absenteeism necessitated a strong administrative apparatus. The archbishop relied on a trusted official, usually a jurist, who presided over the archiepiscopal council and ecclesiastical court in his absence.

Under Cardinal Charles II de Bourbon a pastoral visitation was conducted in 1469–1470, revealing generally satisfactory conditions in parish buildings, liturgical objects, and clerical morals and education. Florentine merchants extensively rebuilt the Jacobin church of Notre-Dame de Confort as their burial place, while Simon de Pavie financed an Annunciation chapel in the Cordeliers' church of Saint-Bonaventure. Charles completed Saint-Jean Cathedral and was buried in its flamboyant-Gothic Bourbon chapel.

Several mendicant orders established houses in Lyon during this period, including the Cordeliers (1467) and Observant Franciscans shortly thereafter.

=== Early 16th century: humanism and reform ===
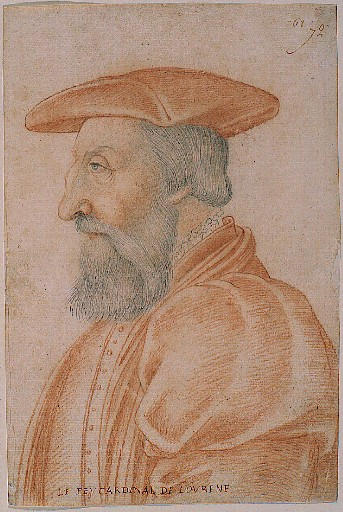
Archbishop Jean de Lorraine (1537–1539).

Reformed ideas took root in Lyon during this period, though most early sympathizers sought renewal within the Church rather than schism. Influenced by humanism, the city maintained a degree of confessional ambiguity that delayed open conflict. Until the 1560s religious allegiance often remained fluid.

==== Archbishops ====
François II de Rohan (1501–1536), whom historian Henri Hours described as "the best of his era", resided frequently in his diocese and worked to reform clerical abuses. At the 1528 provincial council he condemned Lutheran doctrines and attempted to raise standards among his clergy.

His successors Jean de Lorraine (1537–1539) and Ippolito d'Este (1539–1551) largely neglected the diocese. Commissions for devotional books declined while humanist and proto-Reformed works proliferated.

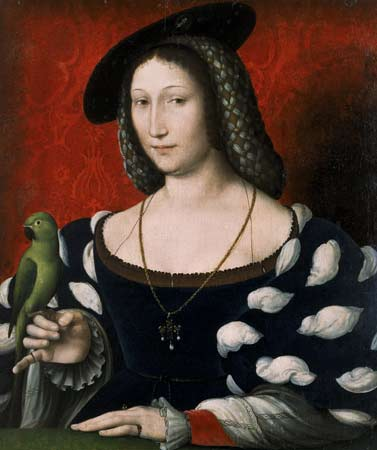
Margaret of Navarre, whose 1524–1525 stay in Lyon helped spread evangelical ideas. Portrait by Jean Clouet, Walker Art Gallery, Liverpool.

==== First signs of new ideas ====
The earliest traces of reform appear in the 1520s. Bookseller Jean Vaugris requested Lutheran texts from Basel in 1520 and sold works by Erasmus and Lefèvre d'Étaples.

Margaret of Navarre's prolonged stay (October 1524 – August 1525) significantly advanced evangelical sentiment. Surrounded by a court sympathetic to returning to primitive Christianity, she sheltered preachers such as the Dominican Aimé Meigret and the Franciscan Pierre de Sébiville, both of whom were eventually silenced.

At the Florentine church of Notre-Dame de Confort, the Dominican Sante Pagnini worked from 1526 on a new Latin Bible based on Hebrew and Greek sources, supported by Francis I and popes Adrian VI and Clement VII. Though published under Catholic auspices, it belonged to the philological movement that fed Protestant translations.

The first executions for heresy occurred in 1534. Repression intensified in the 1540s but remained milder than elsewhere; a clandestine Reformed congregation of about fifty members had formed by 1546.

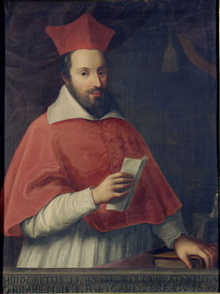
Ippolito II d’Este, frequently absent archbishop.

==== Spread of Reformed ideas through Lyonnais society ====
All social strata except Italians were affected by conversions. The fairs brought regular influxes of foreign merchants and ideas; the consulate, jealous of commercial privileges and traditionally hostile to clerical jurisdiction, shielded suspected heretics. The absence of a theology faculty or Sorbonne-like institution left Catholic controversialists without a strong local base. Printers such as the Frellon brothers, Jean de Tournes, Guillaume Rouillé, and Antoine Vincent produced heterodox works alongside orthodox ones.

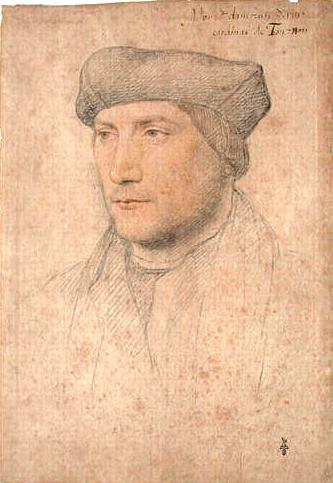
François de Tournon, archbishop of Lyon, after Jean Clouet, Musée Condé.

=== Late 16th century: religious conflict ===
Tensions escalated in the 1550s. Despite persecution and exile to Geneva, the number of Reformed adherents grew. The movement emerged as a political force, encouraged by fluctuating royal policy under Catherine de' Medici and the young Charles IX. In 1560 Protestants attempted to seize the city but were defeated by lieutenant-general Antoine d'Albon.

The July 1561 edict granted freedom of conscience, while the January 1562 edict permitted worship outside city walls. By early 1562 over 4,000 attended sermons, and two Protestants entered the consulate.

==== Lyon as a Protestant capital (1562–1563) ====
Protestants seized power in April 1562. Churches were stripped of images; Saint-Jean Cathedral and Saint-Just cloister were demolished in an iconoclastic wave that swept much of France.

==== Religious war (1563–1572) ====
Catholic restoration relied more on the efforts of individual priests than on archbishops. The Jesuit Edmond Auger preached extensively, ministered to plague victims in 1564, and published a widely circulated catechism. From 1567 the Collège de la Trinité became a Jesuit stronghold.

==== The Catholic League and final restoration (1572–1595) ====
Archbishop Pierre d'Épinac (1573–1599) consolidated the Catholic recovery through administrative reforms.

== Historiography ==
The history of Renaissance Lyon has been extensively studied, with dedicated works addressing its political, economic, social, religious, and cultural dimensions. Certain research areas, however, remain underexplored.

=== Potential research areas ===
Studies of the consulate could draw on consular deliberations. Available online at the Lyon Municipal Archives: Communication within the city could be examined similarly to work on the 17th century. Fiscal records, exploited only sporadically, and testaments—previously studied by Marie-Thérèse Lorcin for earlier periods—await fuller analysis. Economic and social history is advanced, but monographs on major merchants and their families are lacking, despite surviving traces beyond the destroyed notarial archives. Gaps persist in printing and the arts.

=== Historiography of Renaissance urbanism in Lyon ===
Interest in Lyon's monumental heritage began in the 19th century, with Pierre Martin's 1855 Recherches sur l'architecture... dans les maisons du Moyen Âge et de la Renaissance à Lyon. This era produced the Pointet fonds at the municipal archives. From the 1970s, academic work proliferated, including the Documents d'archéologie en Rhône-Alpes et Auvergne series on zones and themes. These reflect broader interest in vernacular archaeology. A first synthesis appeared in 1998 (Pesez and Esquieu). Lyon-specific synthesis followed the 1997 "Au fil du chantier" exhibition.

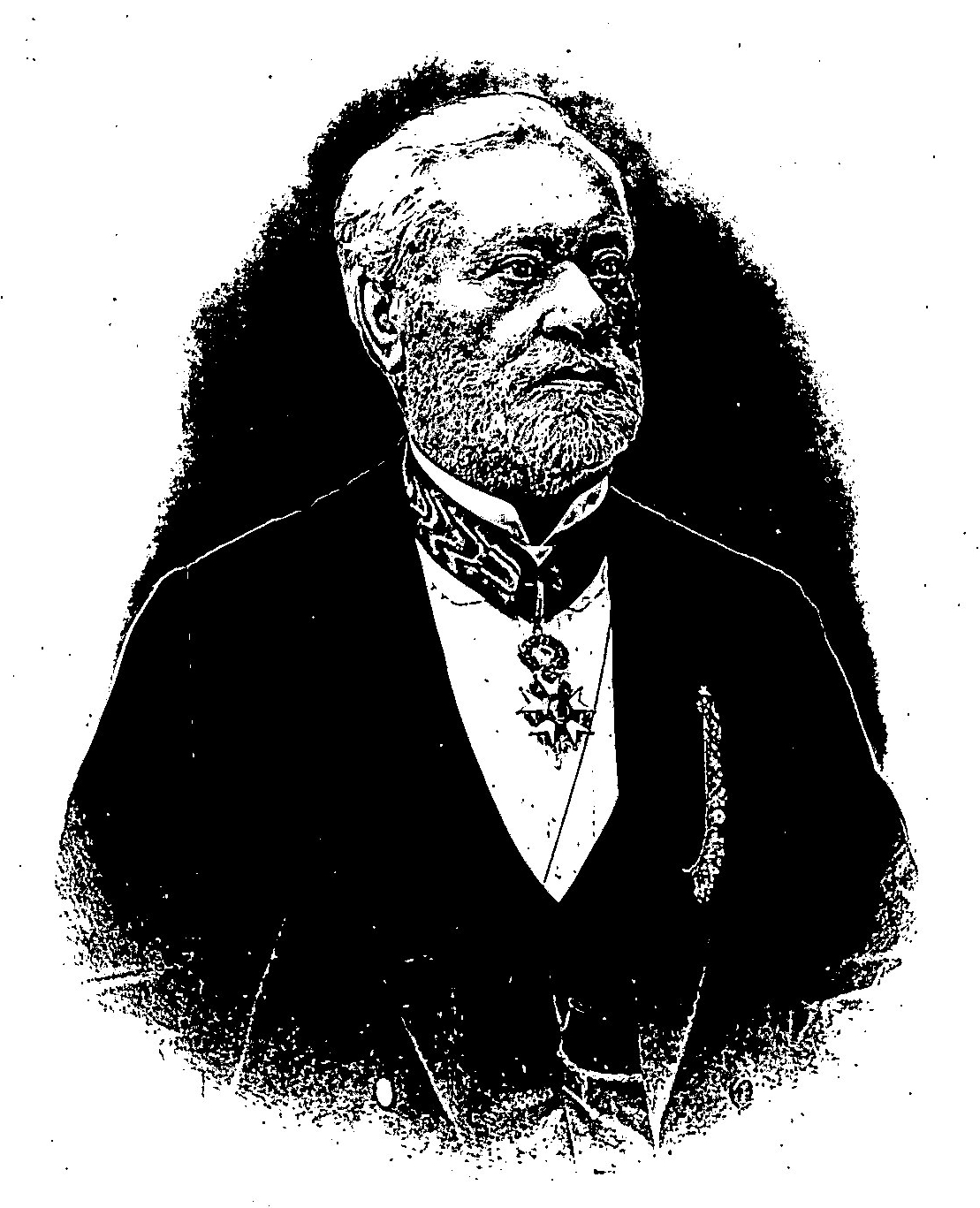
Natalis Rondot, 19th-century scholar of Renaissance art in Lyon.

=== Historiography of Renaissance painting ===
The study of Renaissance painting in Lyon has evolved through distinct phases. The first, contemporary with the artists themselves, consisted of laudatory texts by literati. Jean Lemaire de Belges's 1504 Plainte du désiré praised Jean Hey and Jean Perréal. Early praise focused on portraitists; by mid-century history painters like Bernard Salomon received similar honours.

The 17th–18th centuries saw near-total neglect, except for Salomon and Corneille de Lyon.

From the mid-19th to mid-20th century, local historians revived interest, spurred by collectors such as Pierre Révoil, Jean-Baptiste Carrand, and Édouard Aynard. Key figures included Natalis Rondot, Henri Baudrier, André Steyert, Louis Charvet, Alfred Cartier, and Lucien Bégule, who produced catalogues, repertoires, and dictionaries of Lyonnais artists.

From the 1960s, focus shifted from defining a "Lyonnais school" to situating Lyon in broader European exchanges. The 1965 Petit Palais exhibition Le Seizième siècle européen marked this turn. Recent studies have recontextualized Perréal and Corneille while examining lesser-known figures such as Giovanni Capassini, François Stellaert, and Noël de Lyon. Illumination has been studied by François Avril, Lynn F. Jacobs, and Elizabeth Burin; prints by Peter Sharratt and Vanessa Selbach, including copper engravers (Henri Zerner, Estelle Leutrat).

== Legacy ==
=== Architectural remnants ===
Numerous civil and religious buildings from the Renaissance era survive in various quarters of Lyon, particularly in the Vieux Lyon, designated as one of Europe's largest Renaissance districts and inscribed on the UNESCO World Heritage List in 1998 as part of the Historic Site of Lyon. Notable examples include structures on the Peninsula, such as the Saint-Nizier Church, Lyon, which features a Renaissance portal.

=== Works of art ===
Despite losses during the Wars of Religion and subsequent dispersals, surviving Renaissance artworks from Lyon were presented in the 2015–2016 exhibition Lyon Renaissance: Arts and Humanism at the Musée des Beaux-Arts de Lyon, which assembled nearly 300 objects to provide an overview of the city's artistic production during the period.

== See also ==
- Vieux Lyon
- French Wars of Religion
- Catholic League (French)
- Huguenots
- Museum of Fine Arts of Lyon
- Corneille de Lyon
- Maurice Scève
- Louise Labé

== Bibliography ==
- Baudouin-Matuszek, Marie-Noëlle; Ouvarov, Pavel (1991). Banque et pouvoir au XVIe siècle : la surintendance des finances d'Albisse Del Bene [Banking and power in the 16th century: the superintendence of finances of Albisse Del Bene]. Bibliothèque de l'école des chartes (in French). Vol. 149. pp. 249–291. doi:10.3406/bec.1991.450617. Archived from the original on June 3, 2018.
- Beaufort, Jacques (2009). Vingt siècles d'architecture à Lyon (et dans le Grand Lyon) : Des aqueducs romains au quartier de la Confluence [Twenty centuries of architecture in Lyon (and Greater Lyon): From Roman aqueducts to the Confluence district] (in French). Saint-Julien-Molin-Molette: Jean-Pierre Huguet Éditeur. p. 224. ISBN 978-2-915412-96-3.
- Béghain, Patrice; Benoît, Bruno; Corneloup, Gérard; Thévenon, Laurent (2009). Dictionnaire historique de Lyon [Historical dictionary of Lyon] (in French). Lyon: Stéphane Bachès. p. 1054. ISBN 978-2-915266-65-8.
- Bottineau-Fuchs, Yves (2006). Peindre en France au XVe siècle [Painting in France in the 15th Century] (in French). Arles: Actes Sud. p. 336. ISBN 2-7427-6234-5.
- Boucher, Jacqueline (2001). Vivre à Lyon au XVIe siècle [Living in Lyon in the 16th century] (in French). Lyon: Éditions lyonnaises d'art et d'histoire. p. 159. ISBN 2-84147-113-6.
- Brésard, Marc (1914). Les foires de Lyon aux quinzième et seizième siècles [The fairs of Lyon in the fifteenth and sixteenth centuries] (in French). Paris: Auguste Picard. p. 386.
- Carpi, Olivier (2012). Une république imaginaire : Amboise et l'accueil des exilés florentins (1500–1530) [An imaginary republic: Amboise and the reception of Florentine exiles (1500–1530)] (in French). Honoré Champion. ISBN 978-2-7453-2374-3.
- Dallemagne, François (2010). Les défenses de Lyon : enceintes et fortifications [The defenses of Lyon: enclosures and fortifications] (in French). Lyon: Éditions Lyonnaises d'Art et d'Histoire. p. 255. ISBN 978-2-84147-212-3.
- Deharbe, Karine (2010). Le Bureau des finances de Lyon ; XVIe – XVIIIe siècle : Aspects institutionnels et juridiques [The Lyon finance bureau; 16th–18th century: Institutional and legal aspects]. Ancien Régime (in French). Paris: Comité pour l'Histoire économique et financière de la France / IGPDE. p. 666. ISBN 978-2-11-097510-2.
- Demotz, Bernard; Jeanblanc, Alain; Sommervogel, Jean-Pierre; Chevrier, Sylvie (2011). Histoire de la Savoie (2) : La Savoie de l'an mil à la Réforme [History of Savoy (2): Savoy from the year 1000 to the Reformation] (in French). Grenoble: Glénat. p. 464. ISBN 9782402374675.
- Dubois de Groër, Anne (1996). Corneille de La Haye dit Corneille de Lyon (1500/1510?-1575) [Corneille de La Haye known as Corneille de Lyon (1500/1510?-1575)]. Paris: Arthéna. p. 280. ISBN 2-903239-21-5.
- Dureau, Jeanne-Marie; Gauthiez, Bernard (1994). Dureau, Jeanne-Marie (ed.). "La topographie de Lyon au XVIe siècle" [The Topography of Lyon in the 16th Century]. Lyon, les années Rabelais (1532–1548). Dossier des archives municipales (in French). 6. Lyon: Archives municipales de Lyon. ISBN 2-908949-07-5.
- Faure-Brac, Pierre (1989). Le Vieux-Lyon: histoire & architecture [Old Lyon: history & architecture] (in French). Saint-Julien-Molin-Molette: Jean-Pierre Huguet éditeur. p. 221. ISBN 2-907410-02-4.
- Gardes, Gilbert (1988). Lyon, l'art et la ville, t. 1 : Urbanisme Architecture [Lyon, Art and the City, vol. 1: Urban Planning Architecture] (in French). Paris: Centre national de la recherche scientifique. p. 188. ISBN 2-222-03797-2.
- Gascon, Richard (1971). Grand commerce et vie urbaine au XVIe siècle : Lyon et ses marchands [Grand commerce and urban life in the 16th century: Lyon and its merchants] (in French). Paris: École pratique des hautes études. p. 1001. ISBN 9782713202636.
- Gioffré, Domenico (1960). Gênes et les foires de change de Lyon à Besançon [Genoa and the exchange fairs from Lyon to Besançon] (in French). Paris: SEVPEN. p. 293. doi:10.2307/3111828. JSTOR 3111828.
- Gonthier, Nicole (1980). "Une esquisse du paysage urbain lyonnais aux XIVe et XVe siècles" [A sketch of the Lyonnais urban landscape in the 14th and 15th centuries]. Le paysage urbain au Moyen-Âge. Actes des congrès de la Société des historiens médiévistes de l'enseignement supérieur public. 11e congrès [The urban landscape in the Middle Ages. Proceedings of the conferences of the Society of Medieval Historians in Public Higher Education. 11th conference]. Actes de la Société des Historiens Médiévistes de l'Enseignement Supérieur Public (in French). Vol. 11. Presses universitaires de Lyon. pp. 253–277. doi:10.3406/shmes.1980.1367. ISBN 9782729701192.
- Gonthier, Nicole (1993). Délinquance, justice et société dans le Lyonnais médiéval : de la fin du XIIIe siècle au début du XVIe siècle [Delinquency, justice and society in medieval Lyonnais: from the end of the 13th century to the beginning of the 16th century] (in French). Paris: Arguments. p. 383. ISBN 2-909109-09-7.
- Gonthier, Nicole (1998). Le châtiment du crime au Moyen Âge : XIIe-XVIe siècles [Punishment of crime in the Middle Ages: 12th-16th centuries] (in French). Rennes: Presses universitaires de Rennes. ISBN 2-86447-281-3.
- Gonthier, Nicole (2002). Lyon et ses pauvres au Moyen Âge : 1350-1500 [Lyon and its poor in the Middle Ages: 1350-1500] (in French). Lyon: Éditions de la Société des écrivains. ISBN 2-912359-79-1.
- Guigue, Marie-Claude (1879). Destruction de l'église de Saint-Just, du cloître et de partie du faubourg par les protestants en 1562 : enquêtes et procès-verbaux [Destruction of Saint-Just church, cloister and part of the suburb by Protestants in 1562: inquiries and minutes]. Collection lyonnaise (in French). Vol. 02. Lyon: Henry Georg.
- Jouanna, Arlette (2012). La France du XVIe siècle, 1483-1598 [France in the 16th century, 1483-1598]. Quadrige (in French) (2nd ed.). Paris: Presses Universitaires de France. p. 720. ISBN 978-2-13-060922-3.
- Kleinclausz, Arthur (1939). Kleinclausz, Arthur (ed.). Histoire de Lyon : Des origines à 1595 [History of Lyon: From origins to 1595] (in French). Vol. 1. Lyon: Librairie Pierre Masson. p. 559.
- Krumenacker, Yves (2009). Le Refuge huguenot : Lyon, 1680-1787 [The Huguenot refuge: Lyon, 1680-1787] (in French). Paris: Honoré Champion. ISBN 978-2-7453-1937-1.
- Lejeune, Daniel (2004). Les entrées royales à Lyon : 1495-1642 [Royal entries in Lyon: 1495-1642] (in French). Lyon: Éditions Lyonnaises d'Art et d'Histoire.
- Paillard, Philippe (2010). Histoire des institutions lyonnaises : et extraits de l'ouvrage Émile Perret de la Menue et l'album des pennonages, Ernest Pariset [History of Lyonnais institutions: and extracts from Émile Perret de la Menue's work and the pennonages album, Ernest Pariset]. Futur antérieur (in French). Lyon: EMCE. p. 125. ISBN 978-2-35740-075-7.
- Pelletier, Jean; Rossiaud, Jacques; Bayard, Françoise; Cayez, Pierre (2007). Histoire de Lyon : des origines à nos jours [History of Lyon: from origins to present] (in French). Lyon: Éditions lyonnaises d'art et d'histoire. p. 1054. ISBN 978-2-84147-190-4.
- Rondot, Natalis (1883). Les artistes et les maîtres de métier étrangers ayant travaillé à Lyon [Artists and foreign master craftsmen who worked in Lyon] (in French). Lyon: A. Quantin. p. 8.
- Rossiaud, Jacques (2012). Lyon, 1250-1550 : réalités et imaginaires d'une métropole [Lyon, 1250-1550: realities and imaginaries of a metropolis] (in French). Seyssel: Champ Vallon. p. 540. ISBN 978-2-87673-580-4.
- Sachet, Auguste (1914). Le pardon annuel de Saint-Jean de Lyon : 1392-1790 [The annual pardon of Saint-Jean de Lyon: 1392-1790] (in French). Lyon: Librairie générale catholique et classique Emmanuel Vitte. p. 120.
- Steyert, André (1998) [1860]. Armorial général du Lyonnais, Forez et Beaujolais [General armorial of Lyonnais, Forez and Beaujolais] (in French). Lyon: R. Georges. p. 280. ISBN 2-912556-28-7.
- Vachez, Antoine (1866). Les tombeaux de Saint-Pierre-le-Vieux [The tombs of Saint-Pierre-le-Vieux] (in French). Lyon: Impr. d'A. Vingtrinier.
- Zeller, Olivier (1983). Les recensements lyonnais de 1597 à 1636 : Démographie historique et géographie sociale [Lyonnais censuses from 1597 to 1636: Historical demography and social geography] (in French). Presses universitaires de Lyon. p. 472. ISBN 978-2-7297-0194-9.
- Zerner, Henri (2002). L'art de la Renaissance en France : l'invention du classicisme [Renaissance Art in France: The Invention of Classicism] (in French). Paris: Flammarion. ISBN 978-2-08-010686-5.
