= Thomas I de Gadagne =

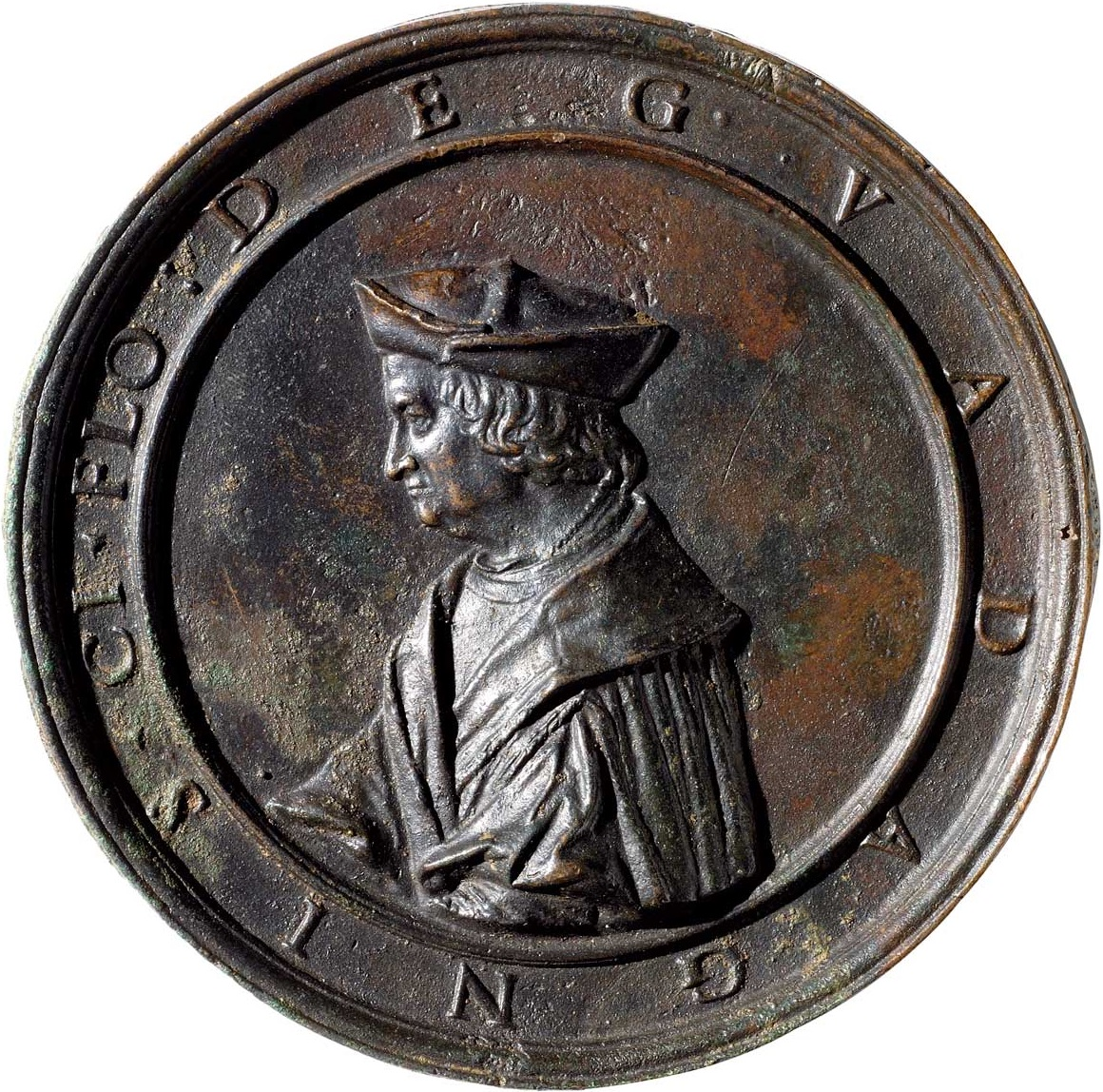
Medallion of Thomas I . Musée Gadagne.

Thomas I de Gadagne, known as Thomas the Rich (26 or 27 August 1454, Savoy - 23 May 1533, Avignon) was a banker from a rich Florentine family who settled in Lyon, France, where he built up trading, banking, and industrial business interests in Lyon and Florence. He made a huge fortune and lent large sums to the kings of France to support their military expeditions to Italy and to finance a French expedition to the Americas.

== Life ==
His father brought his three sons (Thomas, François, and Olivier) to Lyon in 1434. Thomas grew up in Geneva, where his family also had business interests, before following his family to Florence in 1463. He returned to Lyon in 1468 and became an apprentice to a Florentine banking family, the Pazzi. Thomas also based his own financial business in Lyon and became the richest man in the city. His two brothers and then his nephews all worked for his company, and he was its director until 1527.

He was recognized as the most important spice merchant in the city in 1500, and sixteen years later he appeared in the 'nommées' (fiscal registers estimating the wealth of each of the city's citizens for tax purposes) as the richest inhabitant of the city, taxed on 5000 'livres tournois'; for comparison, the next two richest families, the Nasi and Bonvisi, were only taxed on 2500 and 2000 livres tournois, respectively. When a 'consulat' was imposed on foreign merchants in 1523 to fund work on the city walls, he sent sixty men, compared to thirty required of Robert Albisse, twenty of Pierre Salviati, and fifteen of Antoine Gondi. In 1529, the Venetian ambassador Antonio Suriano wrote estimates of each Lyon merchant's wealth; he ranked Thomas at 400,000 ducats.

=== Florentine connections ===
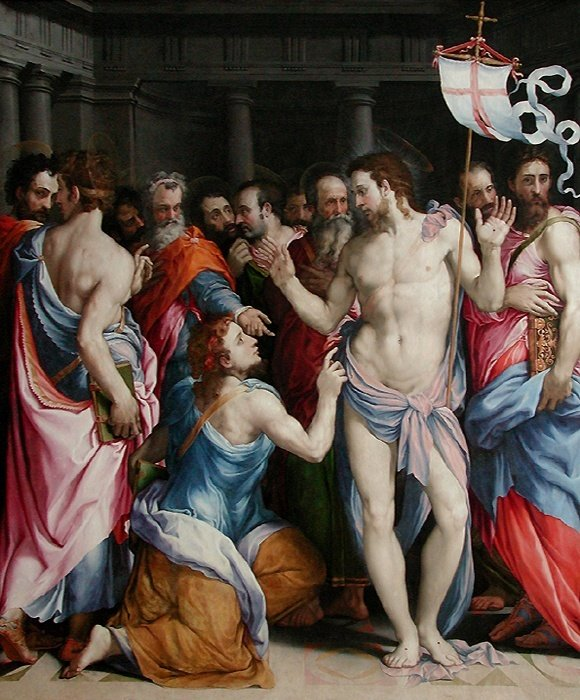
The Incredulity of Saint Thomas by Francesco Salviati, commissioned by Thomas' nephew and heir for the Florentines' chapel. Musée du Louvre.

The Florentines in Lyon lived and worked by statutes officially recognized by the Republic of Florence and had to ensure internal harmony in their own community while also getting protection and representation in the city of Florence and the French court. These statutes were established on 27 November 1501, putting the community under the leadership of four counsellors and a consul. As the leader of the most important mercantile and banking community in Lyon, the consul had the privilege of leading the payments made at the end of each of the four annual fairs.

Thomas was made a counsellor in 1501 and a consul in 1505. He partly paid for the construction of the St. Thomas Chapel in Notre-Dame de Confort, the Florentine church in Lyon, and his heir and nephew later commissioned a painting for it of The Incredulity of Saint Thomas from Francesco Salviati. He also became a member of the wool guild back in Florence in 1497 and made major investments in Florence, mainly in the commercial and industrial sectors. For example, he contributed 4000 florins to founding a wool textile factory in 1502, as well as owning a 60% share and sending his brother Olivier and nephew Niccolo Strozzi to manage the factory. Until his death, he remained very active in developing factories in Florence, gaining major commercial success by doing so.

=== Thomas and the King of France ===
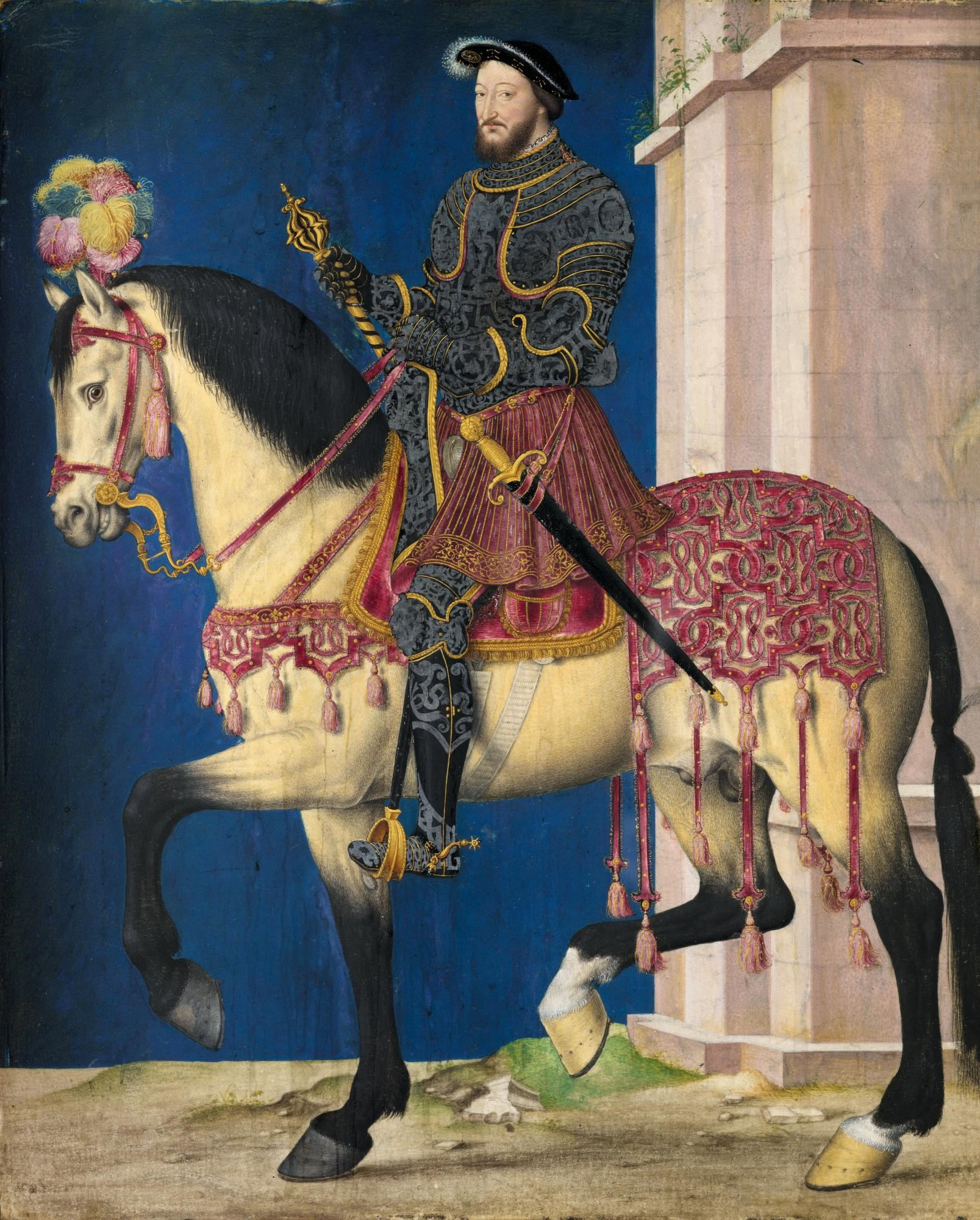
Francis I, c 1540, François Clouet, (Florence, Uffizi).

=== Death ===
He died without issued in 1533 and is buried beside his wife - he left his large fortune to his nephew Thomas II de Gadagne.

== Bibliography ==
- Baudouin-Matuszek, Marie-Noëlle; Ouvarov, Pavel (1991). "Banque et pouvoir au XVIe siècle : la surintendance des finances d'Albisse Del Bene". Bibliothèque de l'École des chartes (in French) (149–2): 249–291.
- Béghain, Patrice; Benoît, Bruno; Corneloup, Gérard (2009). Dictionnaire historique de Lyon (in French). Lyon: S. Bachès. OCLC 682037784. Notice BnF no FRBNF42001687
- Francou, Michel (2009). Armorial des florentins à Lyon à la Renaissance (in French). Lyon: Cosmogone. ISBN 978-2-8103-0020-4. OCLC 437049610.
- Gascon, Richard (1971). Grand commerce et vie urbaine au XVIe siècle : Lyon et ses marchands (environs de 1520-environs de 1580). Civilisations et sociétés (in French). Vol. II]. Paris: S.E.V.P.E.N. Mouton. OCLC 40346858. Notice BnF no FRBNF35371690
- Lejeune, Edouard (2004). La saga lyonnaise des Gadagne (in French). Lyon: Editions lyonnaises d'art et d'histoire. ISBN 2-84147-153-5. OCLC 55236680.
- Passerini, Luigi (1873). Genealogia e storia della famiglia Guadagni (in Italian). Firenze: M. Cellini. OCLC 681467133. Notice BnF no FRBNF31064839
- Rocke, M. (1955). The Guadagni of Florence : Family and Society. Medieval and Early Moderne Italy.
- Yver, Georges (1902). De Guadagniis (les Gadaigne) mercatoribus Florentinis Lugduni, XVIe p. Chr. n. saeculo, commorantibus (Thesis) (in Latin). Paris: Cerf. OCLC 247711761. Notice BnF no FRBNF31677741
