= Guillaume de Gadagne =

French soldier and nobleman

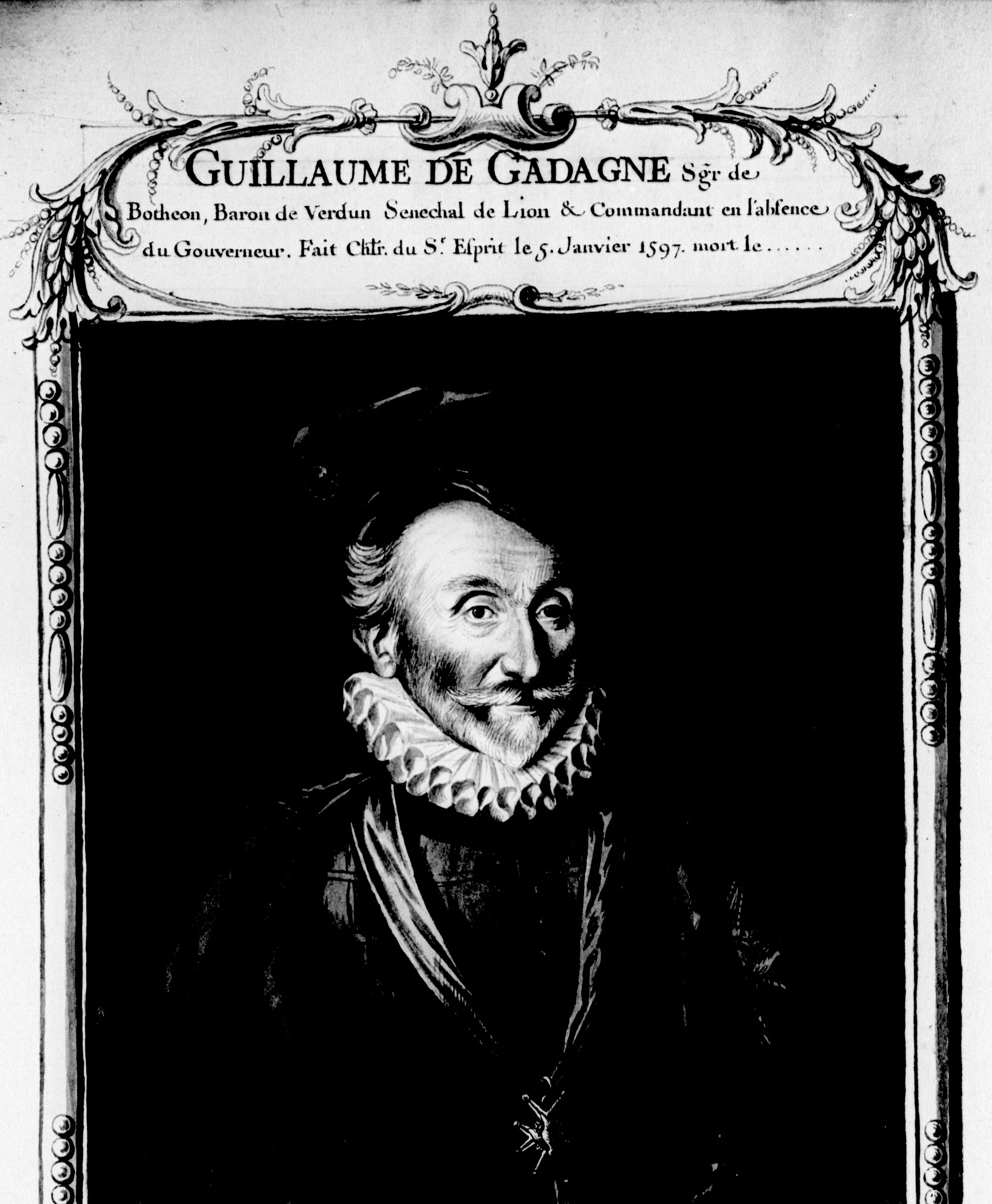
Guillaume in 1597

Guillaume de Gadagne (died 1601) was a French soldier and nobleman. He came from the Guadagni family, a rich family of bankers and businessmen from Pontassieve near Florence which had been forced out of Italy by the Medici.

== Life ==
Guillaume was the son of Thomas II de Gadagne and Peronette Berti, making him great-nephew to Thomas I of Gadagne, known as "Thomas the rich". On 23 November 1561 he married Jeanne de Sugny (died 19 January 1601), a descendant of an old family from Forez - they had three sons (Claude, Nicolas and Gaspard) and five daughters (Lucrèce, Diane, Hilaire, Anne and Gabrielle, the last of whom was later stepmother to Melchior Mitte de Chevrières).

He and his brother Thomas III de Gadagne owned the Hôtel de Gadagne (now the Musées Gadagne) in Lyon, but Guillaume's main residence was at château de Bouthéon (in what is now the Loire department), which he bought in 1561 - he is thus often known as "Monsieur de Bothéon". He was seneschal of Lyon from 1554 and lieutenant general of the inhabitants of Lyon, Forez and Beaujolais from 1554 to 1555 and again from 1588.

Henry II of France made him one of his 28 gentleman of the privy chamber. He fought with distinction at the battle of Dreux, receiving the collar of the Order of Saint Michael as a reward from Charles IX of France. He was made a king's councilor by Henry III of France and the same year he was also the deputy for the nobility of Forez at the Estates General of 1588 to 1589.

For his loyalty in the French Wars of Religion, in 1597 Henry IV of France granted him the cross of the Order of the Holy Spirit, the highest French chivalric award at the time. In 1600, when Henry's future wife Maria de Medici was due to pass through Lyon, the king asked Guillaume to lead the preparations for her arrival. Guillaume and his wife were buried at the Église Notre-Dame-de-Confort in Lyon on 5 February 1601.
