= Église Notre-Dame-de-Confort =

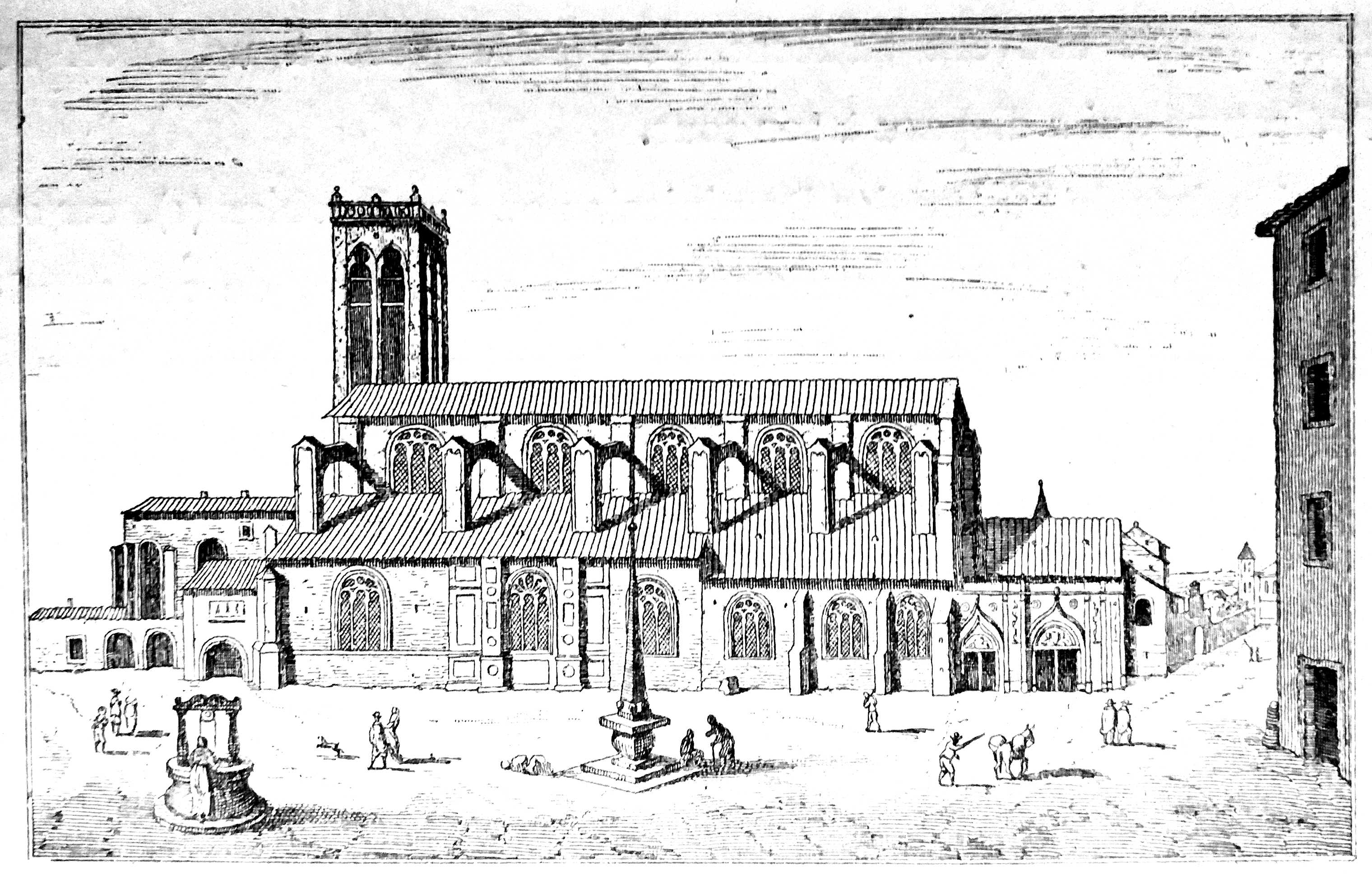
- Church and Place des Jacobins (Israël Silvestre)
- Église Notre-Dame-de-Confort
- 45.760502°N 4.833551°W
- Location: Lyon
- Country: France
- Denomination: Roman Catholic

Architecture
- Years built: 1218
- Demolished: 1816

The Église Notre-Dame-de-Confort (Church of Our Lady of Comfort) was a church in the French city of Lyon, near Place des Jacobins, where a plaque marks its site.

== History ==
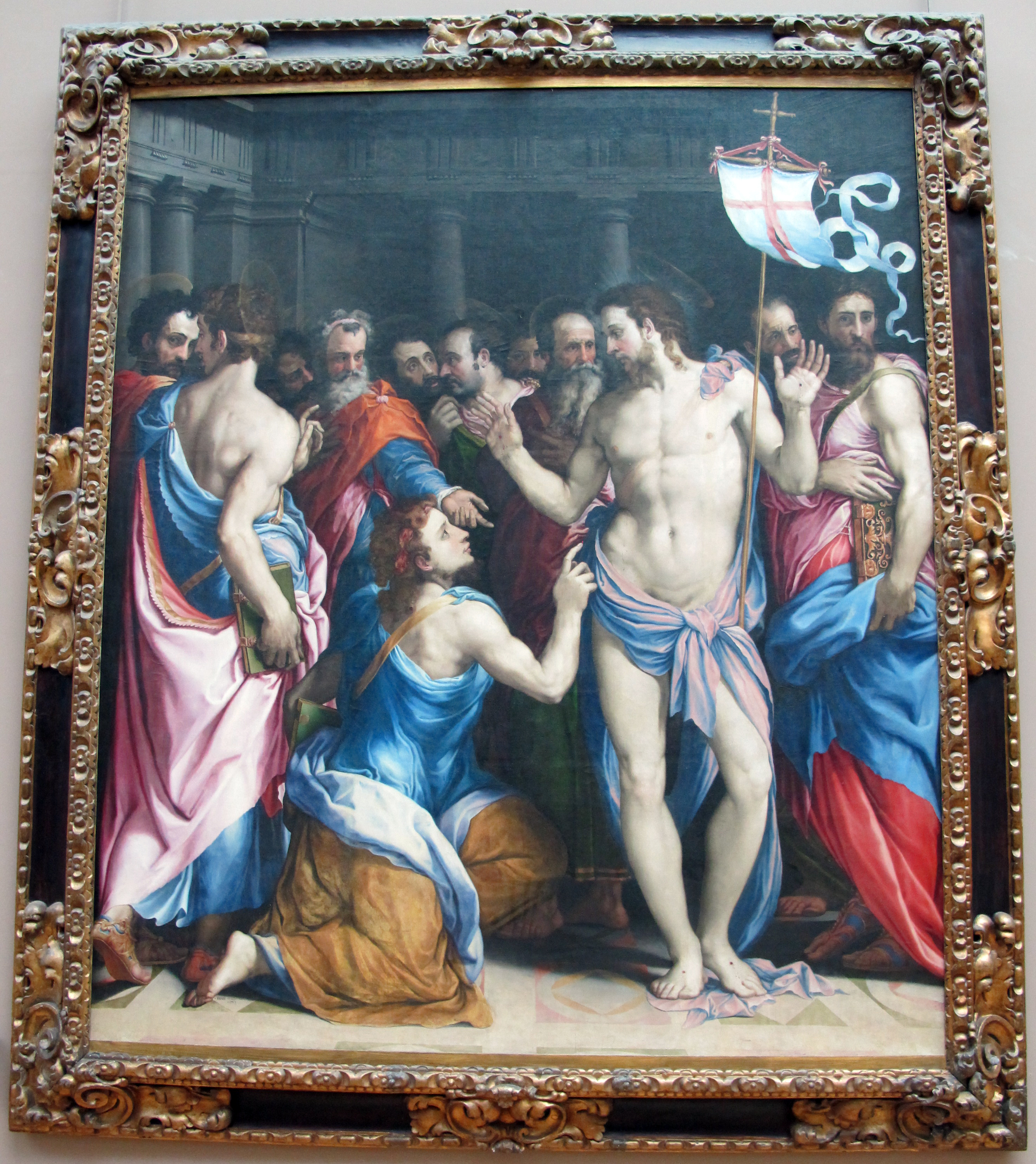
Salviati's The Incredulity of Saint Thomas, commissioned for the Gadagne chapel. Louvre.

Founded in 1218, the church was under Dominican control and used by the city's large Florentine community as their national church. In 1464 they won the right to bury their dead there and they provided most of the money for its improvement and expansion.

In 1517 Bartolomeo Panciantichi was the first to add a chapel to the church. He commissioned an oil on panel altarpiece of the Assumption of the Virgin Mary for it in 1522 from Andrea del Sarto, but the artist chose a poor piece of wood and the work remained incomplete and never exhibited in Lyon. In 1526 Thomas I de Gadagne donated the cost of another chapel, where he and his wife were later buried. His nephew and heir Thomas II commissioned Francesco Salviati to paint a work for it showing The Incredulity of Saint Thomas. The banker Leonardo Spiza added a mausoleum to the church, as did another Florentine who commissioned Antonio Rossellino to design it. The church was demolished in 1816, though the entrance arch to one of its chapels can still be seen at 8-10 rue de Sully, where it was reused after the church's demolition.

== Sources ==
- Béghain, Patrice (2011). Une histoire de la peinture à Lyon : de 1482 à nos jours. Lyon: S. Bachès. ISBN 978-2-35752-084-4.
- Iacono, Giuseppe; Furone, Salvatore Ennio (1999). Les marchands banquiers florentins et l'architecture à Lyon au seizième siècle. Paris: Publisud. ISBN 978-2-86600-683-9.
- Lejeune, Édouard (2004). La saga lyonnaise des Gadagne. Lyon: Éditions lyonnaises d'art et d'histoire. ISBN 978-2-84147-153-9.
