= Carlo Rimbotti =

Florentine physician

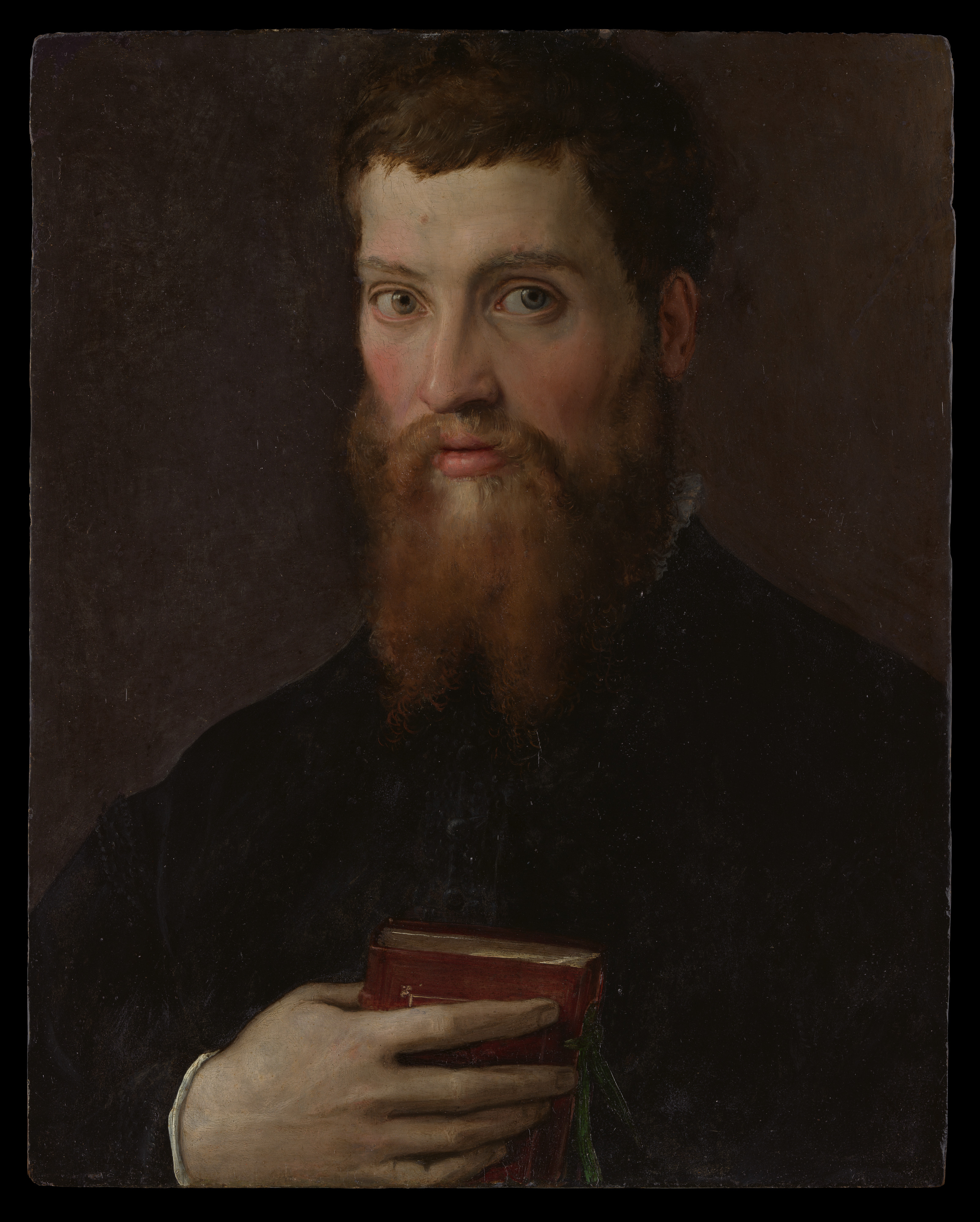
- Portrait by Francesco Salviati (1548)
- Born: 1518; Florence, Florentine Republic
- Died: 1591 (aged 72–73)
- Education: University of Bologna
- Occupation: Physician
- Organization: Accademia Fiorentina

Carlo Rimbotti (1518–1591) was a Florentine physician and a member of the Accademia Fiorentina, a prominent philosophical and literary society during the Renaissance.

Rimbotti studied medicine at the University of Bologna and in January 1542 he was admitted to the Accademia, where he participated actively and delivered three public lectures. The last of them, delivered in December of that year, discussed a sonnet by Petrarch.

He became a practicing physician in 1543 and five years later, at the age of 30, he posed for Francesco Salviati, a fellow member of the Florentine Academy. His oil on wood portrait, completed by the Mannerist master in 1548, depicts him holding a small book next to his heart, perhaps a petrarchino alluding to his last lecture at the institution.

In 1565 Rimbotti submitted an incomplete genealogical study trying to link his family to the Rimbotti di Siena.

== See also ==
- Accademia Fiorentina, a philosophical and literary society.
