= Giacomo Franco =

Italian publisher, painter, and etcher (1550–1620)

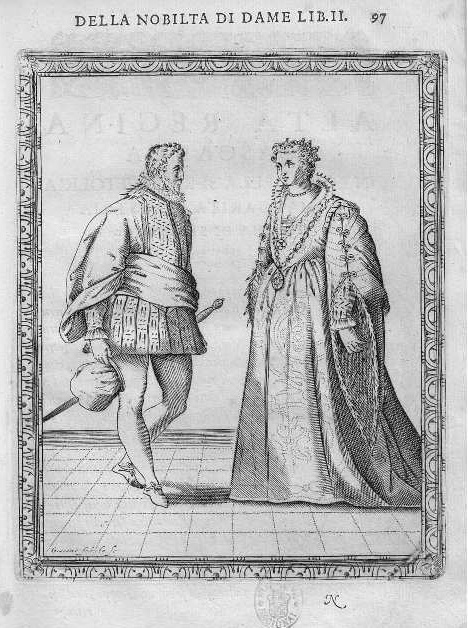
Intaglio engraving by Giacomo Franco for Il ballarino by Fabritio Caroso, republished in 1630 under the title: Raccolta di varij balli fatti in occorrenze di nozze e festini da nobili cavalieri e dame di di diuerse nationi Biblioteca Nacional de España.

Giacomo Franco (1550 in Urbino (?) – 1620 in Venice) was an Italian engraver and publisher.

== Biography ==
The natural son of Battista Franco, also a painter and engraver, he was born in 1550, probably in Urbino or perhaps in Venice, where all his known activity is recorded. He must have trained with his father, who in his youth in Rome had executed some etchings reproducing the frescoes of the Sistine Chapel and the Raphael Rooms.

He illustrated books with etchings and engravings, such as Fabritio Caroso da Sermoneta's Il ballarino (1581), reprinted several times, Ovid's Metamorphoses in the Venetian edition of 1584, and Torquato Tasso's Gerusalemme Liberata in the first illustrated edition, printed in Genoa in 1590. The twenty plates and title page of this work were drawn by Bernardo Castello, who however signed only two plates. It is therefore possible that the remaining plates and the frontispiece of the book are the work of Agostino Carracci, who could have received the commission between 1588 and 1589, during his stay in Venice. Perhaps Franco then met the Bolognese artist, whose translation prints he then used several times. In this period, he provided reproduction prints, such as Veronese's Pietà and the Mystic Marriage of St. Catherine. Beginning in 1595, he also appears as a publisher of works by Agostino Carracci and Palma il Giovane, among others.

Franco is also the author of two series of engravings dedicated to showing Venetian costumes in all their variety and richness, to demonstrate the power and luxury of the Venetian Republic: Habiti delle done venetiane intaggliate a Roma and Habiti d'huomeni et donne venetiane con la processione della Serma. Signoria et altri particolari cioé trionfi feste e cérimonie publiche della nobilissima città di Venetia, Venice, 1610.

== Sources ==
- Fernando Checa & al. (2007). El Renacimiento en Venecia (in Spanish). Madrid: Museo Thyssen-Bornemisza. ISBN 978-84-15113-97-3.
