= Jacopino del Conte =

Italian painter (1510–1598)

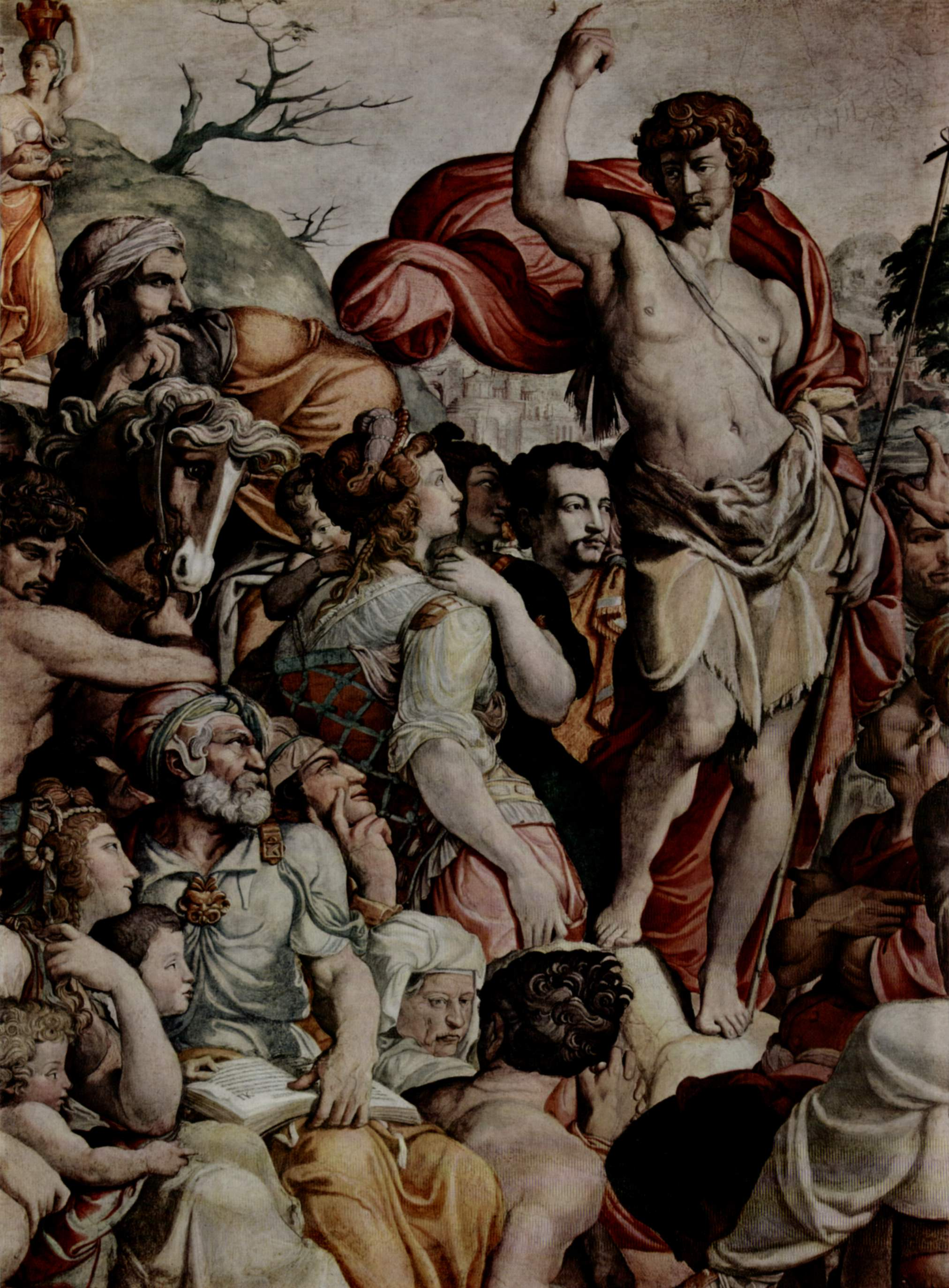
Frescoes in San Giovanni Battista Decollato (detail).

Jacopino del Conte (1510–1598; also spelled Iacopino) was an Italian Mannerist painter, active in both Rome and Florence.

A native of Florence, Jacopino del Conte was born the same year as another Florentine master Cecchino del Salviati (whom Conte outlived by 35 years) and, like Salviati and a number of other painters, he initially apprenticed with the influential painter and draftsman Andrea del Sarto.

Conte's first frescoes, including Annunciation to Zachariah (1536), Preaching of Saint John the Baptist (1538), and Baptism of Christ (1541) were in the Florentine-supported Oratory of San Giovanni Decollato, in Rome. The Preaching fresco was based on a drawing by Perin del Vaga. In 1547–48, in collaboration with Siciolante da Sermoneta, Conte completed the fresco decoration of the chapel of San Remigio in San Luigi dei Francesi. In 1552, he painted another work for the San Giovanni Decollato Oratory, the altarpiece Deposition, whose designs are sometimes attributed to Daniele da Volterra.

Although the specific dates of his birth and death were not documented, in his final year Jacopino del Conte would have been 89 years old.
