= San Giovanni Battista Decollato =

- Church of Saint John the Baptist Beheaded
- Chiesa di San Giovanni Battista Decollato
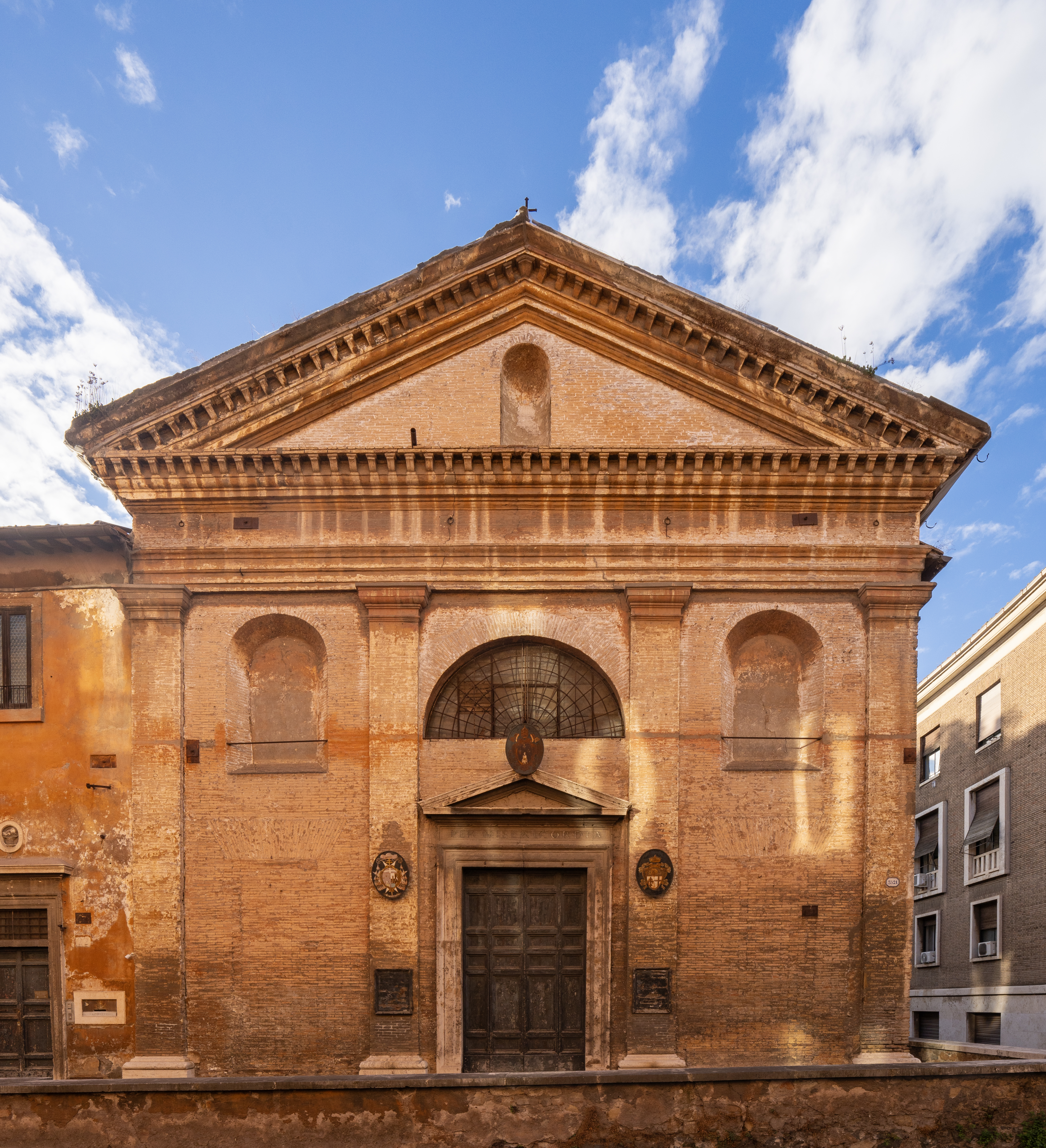
- Click on the map for a fullscreen view
- 41.8899°N 12.4818°E
- Location: 22 Via di San Giovanni Decollato, Ripa, Rome
- Denomination: Catholic
- Religious order: Archconfraternity of the Beheaded John the Baptist

History
- Status: regional church
- Dedication: John the Baptist

Architecture
- Functional status: semi-active, one Saturday Mass
- Architectural type: Renaissance
- Groundbreaking: 1490
- Completed: 1588

Administration
- Diocese: Rome

San Giovanni Decollato (the Beheaded John the Baptist) is a Roman Catholic church in Rome, sited on via di San Giovanni Decollato in the Ripa rione, a narrow road named after the church. Its construction took most of the 16th century.

It was controlled by a confraternity from Florence, where John the Baptist was the city's patron saint, and Florentines, including popes, sponsored much of the important art in the church, mostly by Florentine artists. The confraternity's Oratory of San Giovanni Decollato, to the left of the main church facade, has Mannerist frescos by Francesco Salviati, Jacopino del Conte, both originally Florentine, and Pirro Ligorio, from the years around 1540. These run round the upper walls of the room, above wall seats, with an altar at the far end.

Members of the confraternity included Michelangelo and Vasari, as well as the Florentine popes Clement VIII, Urban VIII and Clement XII. After 1540 they were allowed to countermand one execution a year.

The diocesan website still calls it a chiesa rettoria, indicating a function and affiliation other than an ordinary parish church, in this case as one of Rome's many national and regional churches. Its role was rather overtaken by the grander San Giovanni dei Fiorentini, also built over the 16th century.

== History ==
The present church stands on the site of an ancient church called Santa Maria de fovea, Santa Maria della fossa or Santa Maria in petrocia. In 1488 it was granted to the Archconfraternity of the Beheaded John the Baptist, which began rebuilding it in 1504, gave it its present dedication and made its main feast day that of the beheading of John the Baptist.

The Archconfraternity originated in Florence and was named after the city's patron saint – its remit was to help those condemned to death, invite them to repent, give them the last rites and bury their bodies. The new church was completed in 1588 and in 1600 Pope Clement VIII had a new cloister built for it, behind the oratory, in which the mass graves of those condemned to death can still be seen – they are covered in marble and inscribed 'DOMINE CVM VENERIS IVDICARE NOLI NOS CONDEMNARE' ('Lord, when you come to judge, do not condemn us'). The church was restored in 1727 and 1888. It was formerly a titular church, with Mario Nasalli Rocca di Corneliano holding the cardinal-diaconate between 1969 and 1988.

A small museum has various rather grisly exhibits from the execution process, including the basket that caught the head of the famous murderess Beatrice Cenci, beheaded in 1599. With Giordano Bruno, she was one of the confraternity's more famous clients. This is apparently only open on the church's feast day of 24 June (Birth of St John).

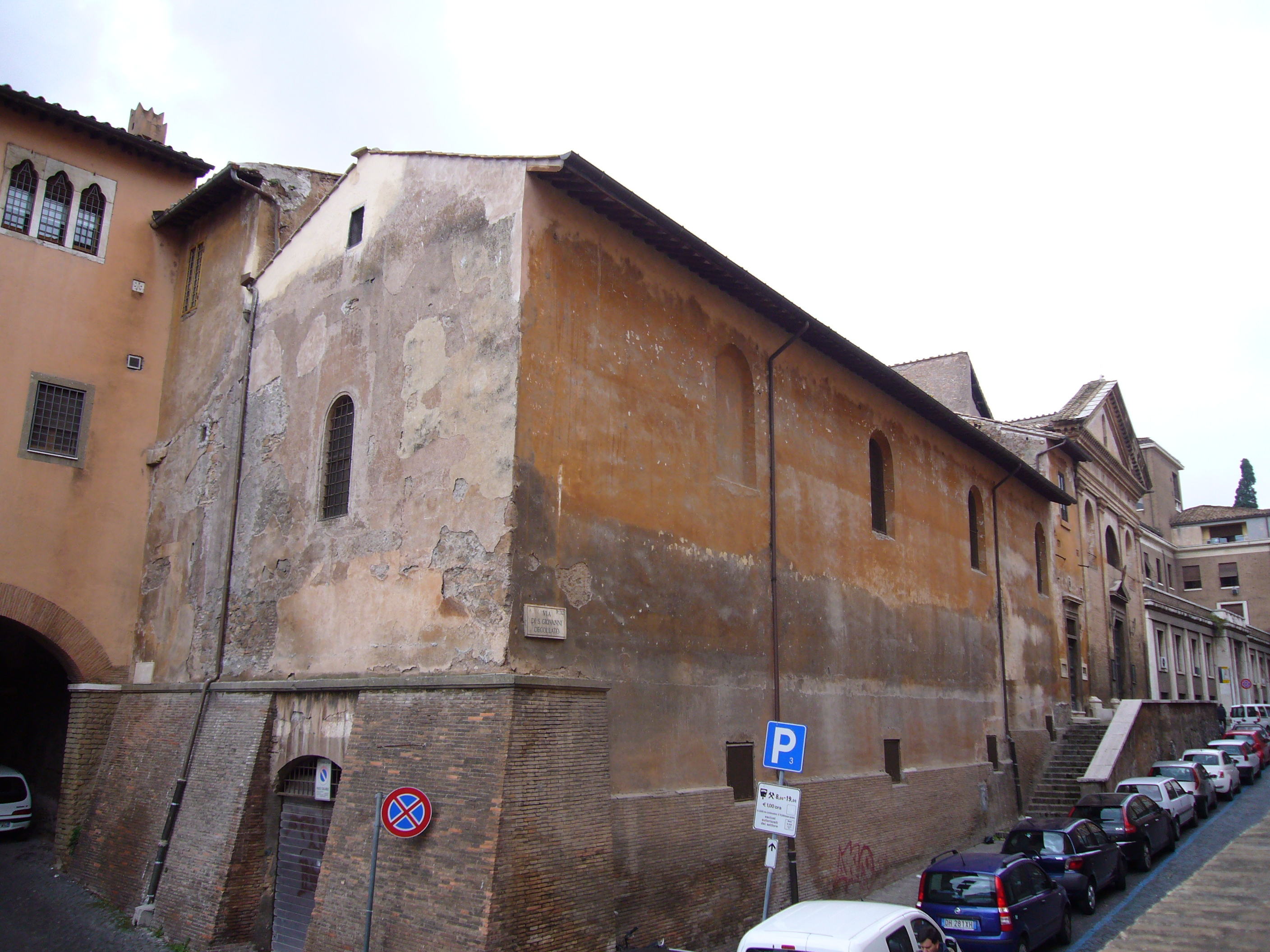
The Oratory, with the church facade beyond

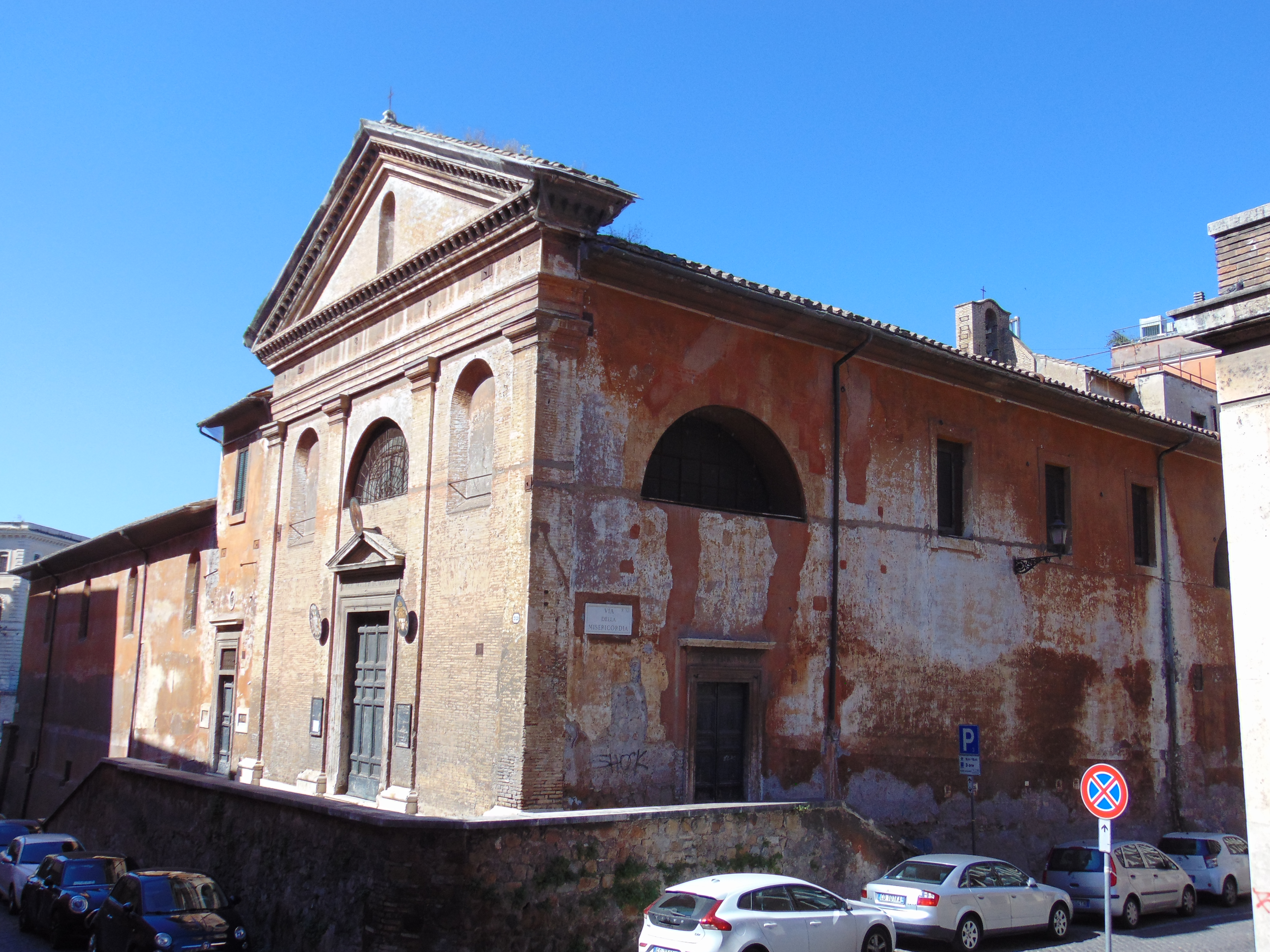
The church from the side

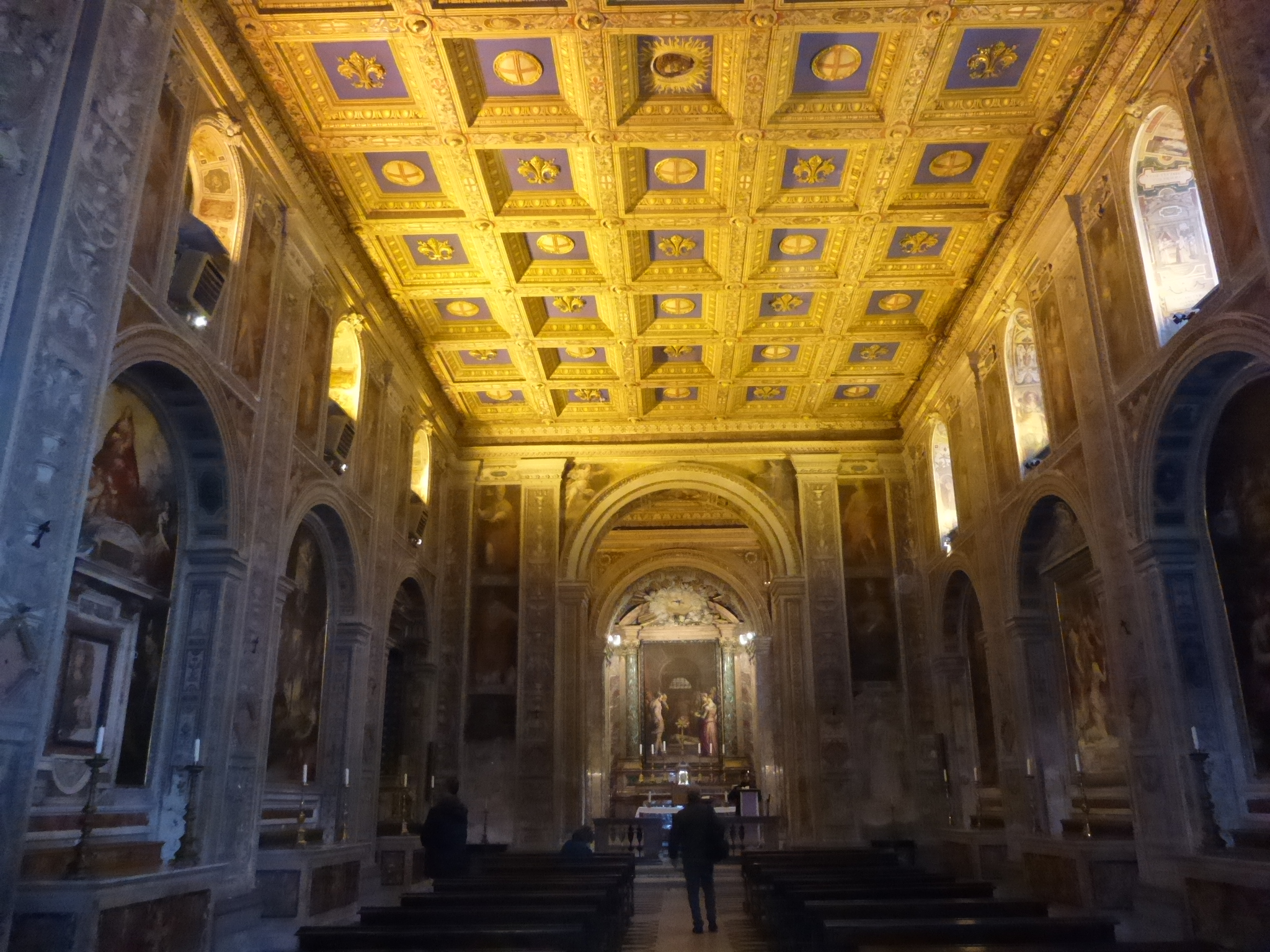
The nave, with Florentine lilies in the coffered ceiling

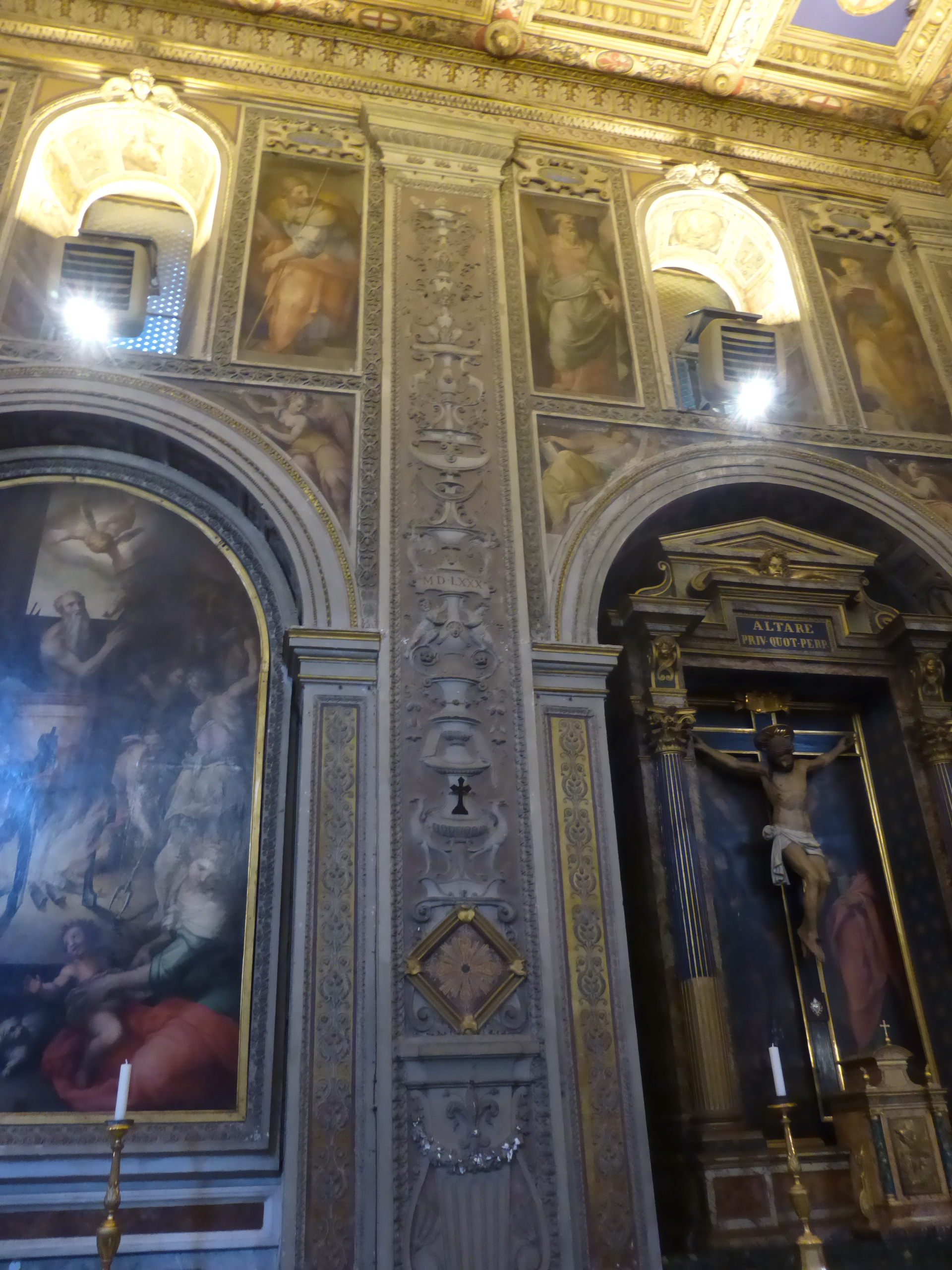
Side wall of the nave, with the Naldini altarpiece

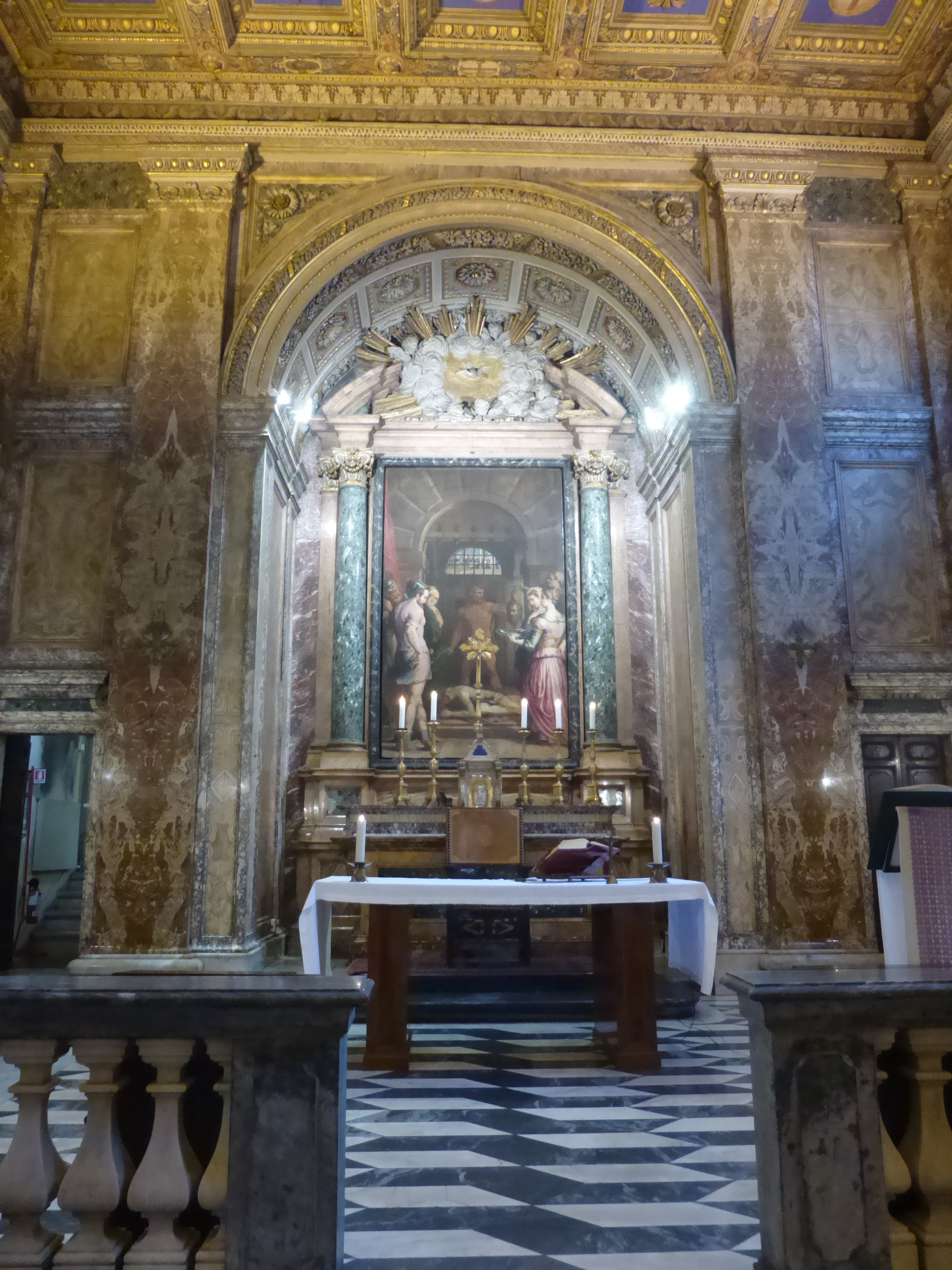
Main altar, altarpiece by Giorgio Vasari, 1551

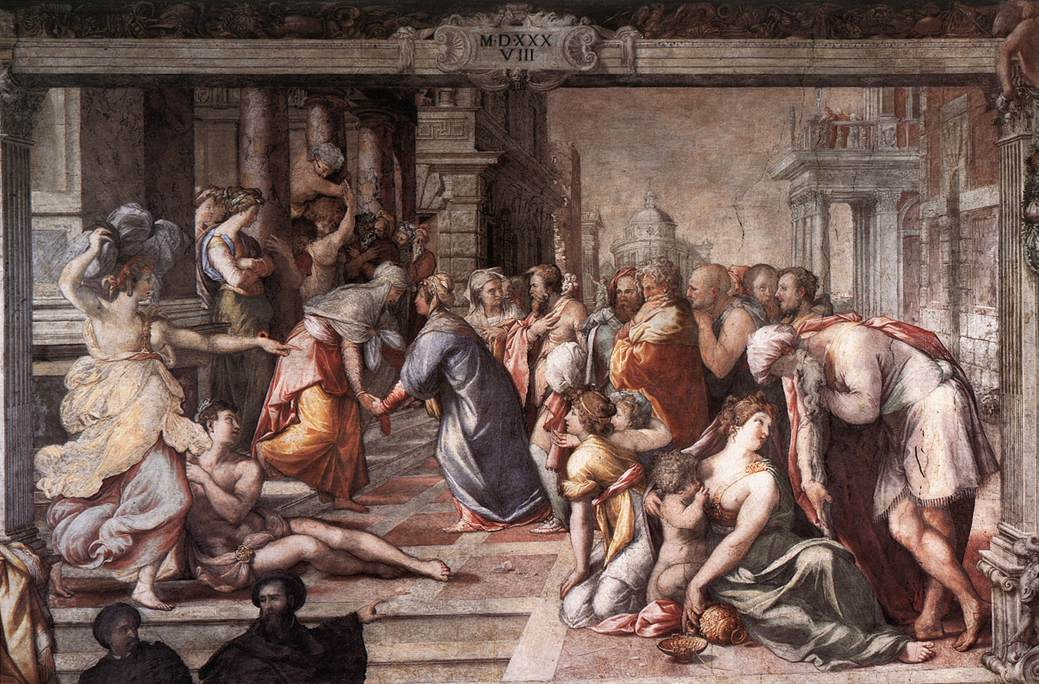
Francesco Salviati's first fresco in the Oratory, Visitation, 1538

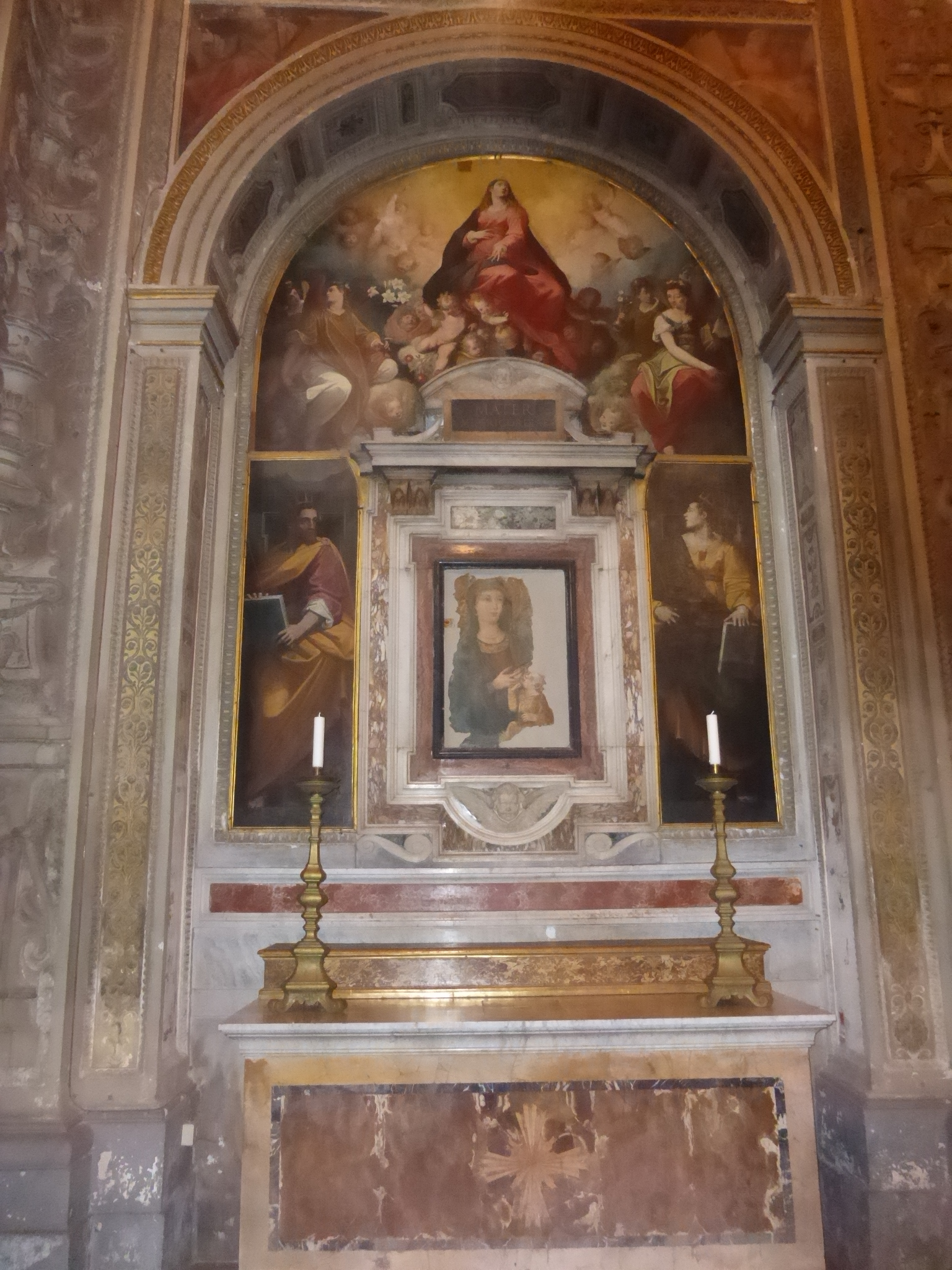
The canonically crowned icon of the Madonna della Misericordia

== Art ==
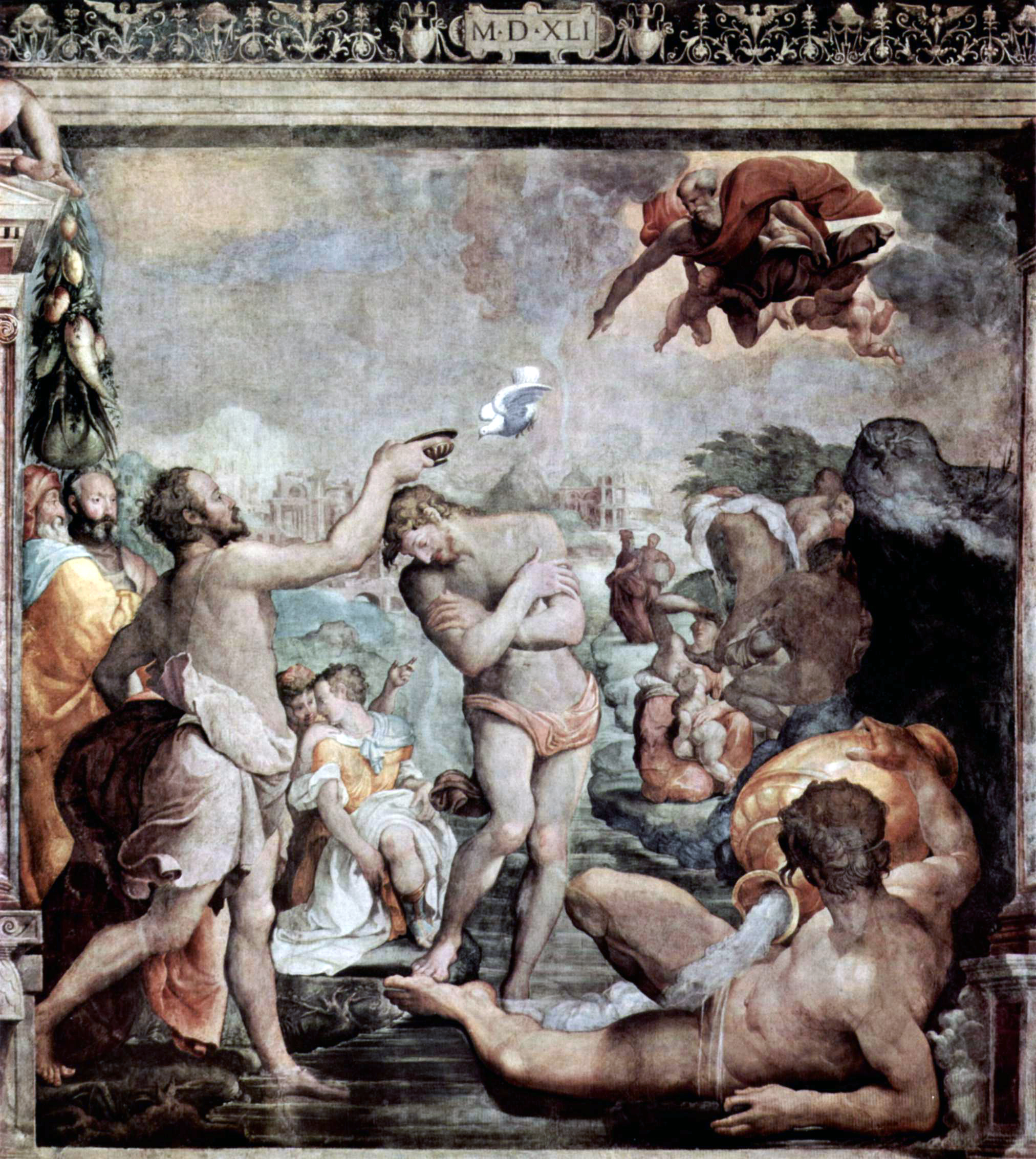
Jacopo del Conte, Baptism of Christ in the Oratory, 1541.

With the main structure in place by the late 1430s, commissions for paintings began. The Confraternity "chose to make their oratory a show-piece of modern decoration", using Florentine Mannerist artists in a cycle on the life of Saint John, beginning with a fresco Annunciation to Zachariah by Jacopino del Conte, perhaps in 1536. After a Baptism of Christ in 1541, Del Conte was also to close the decorative programme, with a Deposition altarpiece in c. 1552, the design for which is sometimes attributed to Daniele da Volterra. Over the intervening years, "the Oratory became the most important collective artistic manisfestation of its time in Rome and the monument most representative of the emergence of Roman high Maniera style".

Francesco Salviati frescoed a Visitation in 1538 that marks "a clear stage" in the new style, despite owing much to Perino del Vaga. Del Vago also seems to have supplied the drawing on which del Conte's fresco of Saint John Preaching (1538) was based. Salviati also painted the two large figures of Saints Andrew and Bartholemew flanking the altarpiece, and a fictive window.

Battista Franco, a Venetian, painted an Arrest of Saint John, probably in 1541. Pirro Ligorio painted the Dance of Salome, and probably the background to the Beheading, with the figures by an assistant to Salviati, to his master's design.

Salviati was absent from Rome from 1543 and 1548, and on his return found that "gathering conservatism" and the "ever-rising concentration of authority in Michelangelo" put his "high Maniera" style out of favour. Perhaps as a response, his Birth of Saint John of 1551 seems to attempt to follow Michelangelo's style, not very successfully.

Giorgio Vasari did the church's main altarpiece, another Beheading, in 1551. Giovanni Battista Naldini, a pupil of Pontormo and associate of Vasari, did a side-altar with the relatively rare scene of Saint John of Patmos in the boiling oil. Another side-altar centres on a fragmentary medieval Virgo Lactans from the previous church on the site, the only significant exception to the Mannerist style that the church otherwise displays.
