= Battista Franco Veneziano =

Italian painter

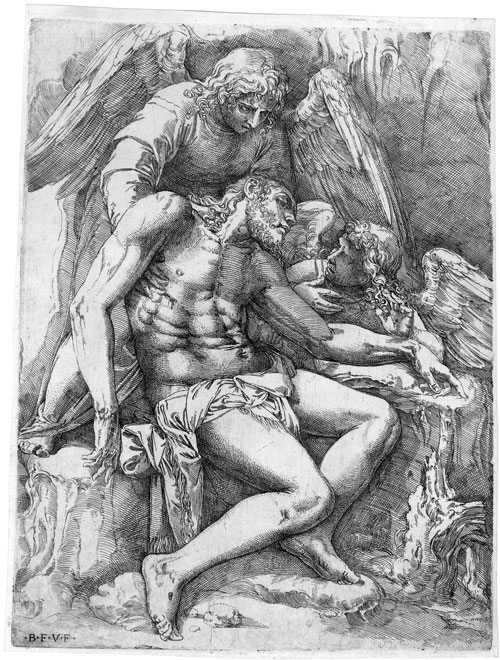
The dead Christ supported by angels. Etching, 26,3 x 20,4 cm

Battista Franco Veneziano (c. 1510 - 1561), baptized Giovanni Battista Franco, was an Italian Mannerist painter and printmaker in etching active in Rome, Urbino, and Venice in the mid 16th century. He is also known as il Semolei or just Battista Franco.

Native to Venice, he came to Rome in his twenties. He painted an allegory of the Battle of Montemurlo now in the Pitti Palace (1537), and a fresco of the Arrest of John the Baptist for the Oratory of San Giovanni Decollato (1541). From 1545–51 he painted in Urbino. He may have been, along with Girolamo Genga, one of the mentors of Federico Barocci. His painting, in the Mannerist style, was heavily indebted to Michelangelo; but his drawings and etchings have far more verve and originality. He returned to Venice, where he helped fresco the ceiling of the Biblioteca Marciana (library). He painted a series of panels, including a Baptism of Christ (Barbaro chapel), for the walls and vault of the Grimani chapel in the church San Francesco della Vigna in Venice. He painted the Raising of Lazarus in the Ducal palace. He is the father of etcher and publisher Giacomo Franco.

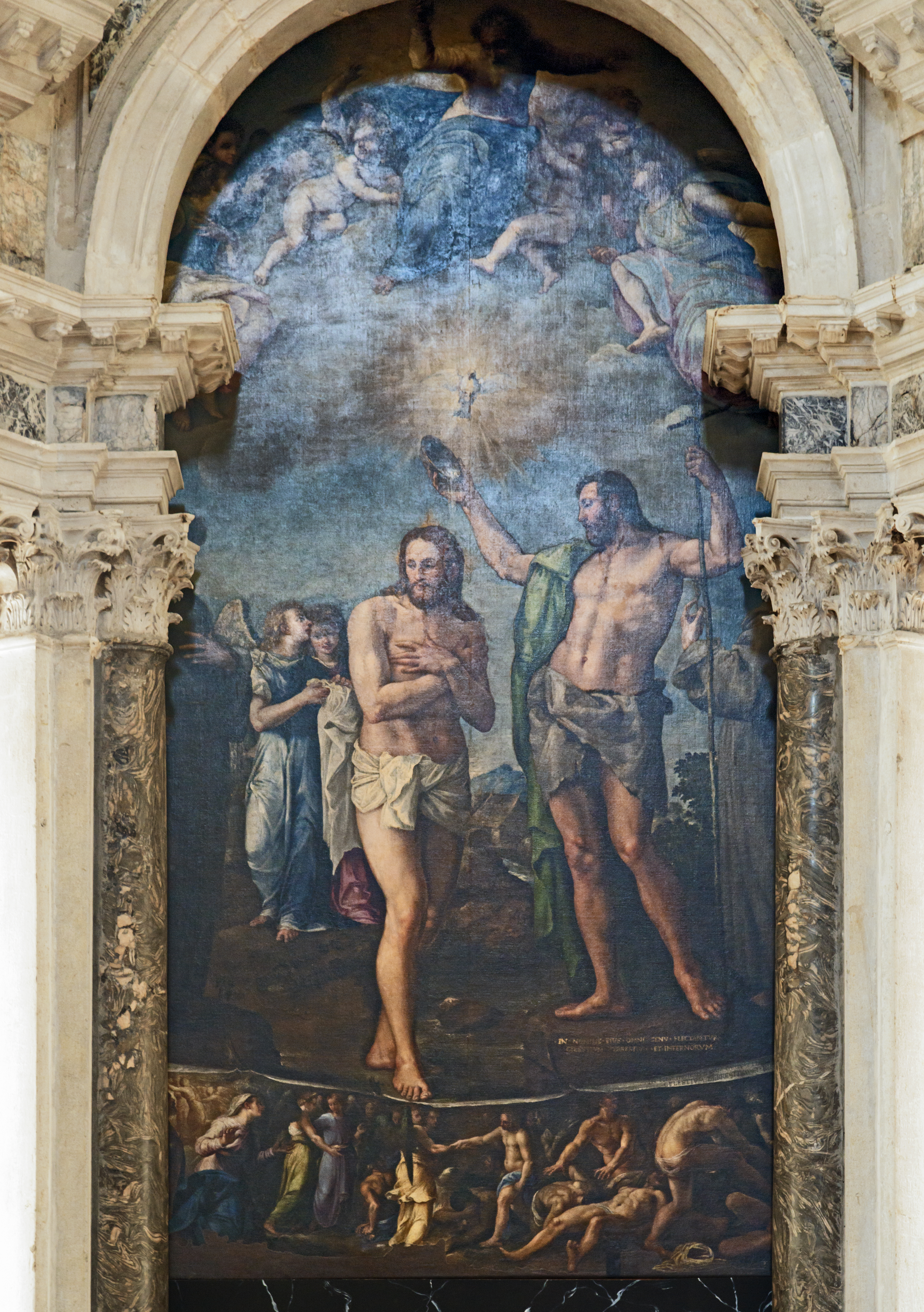
Baptism of Christ San Francesco della Vigna

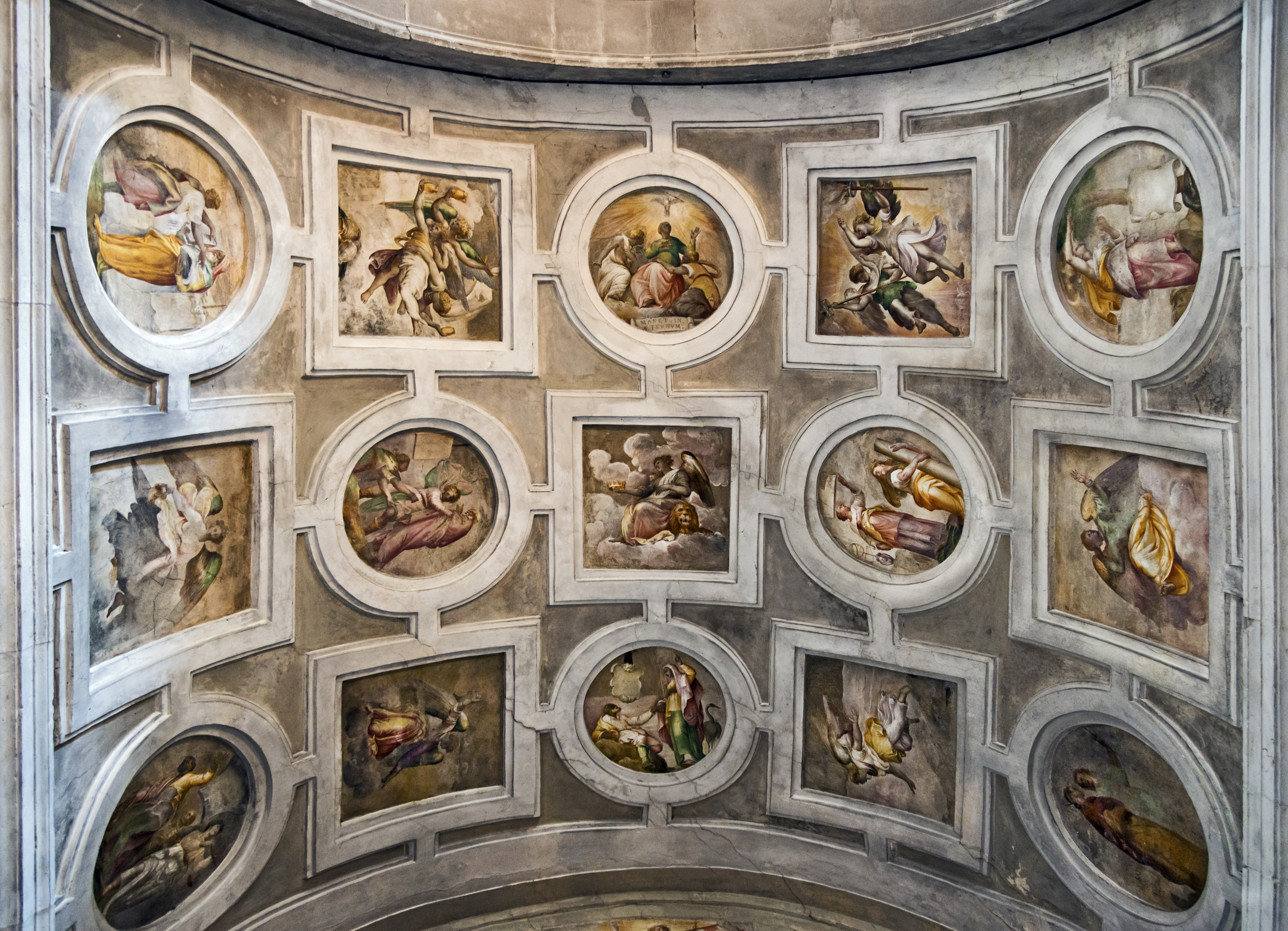
Vault of Grimani chapel San Francesco della Vigna
