= Thomas II de Gadagne =

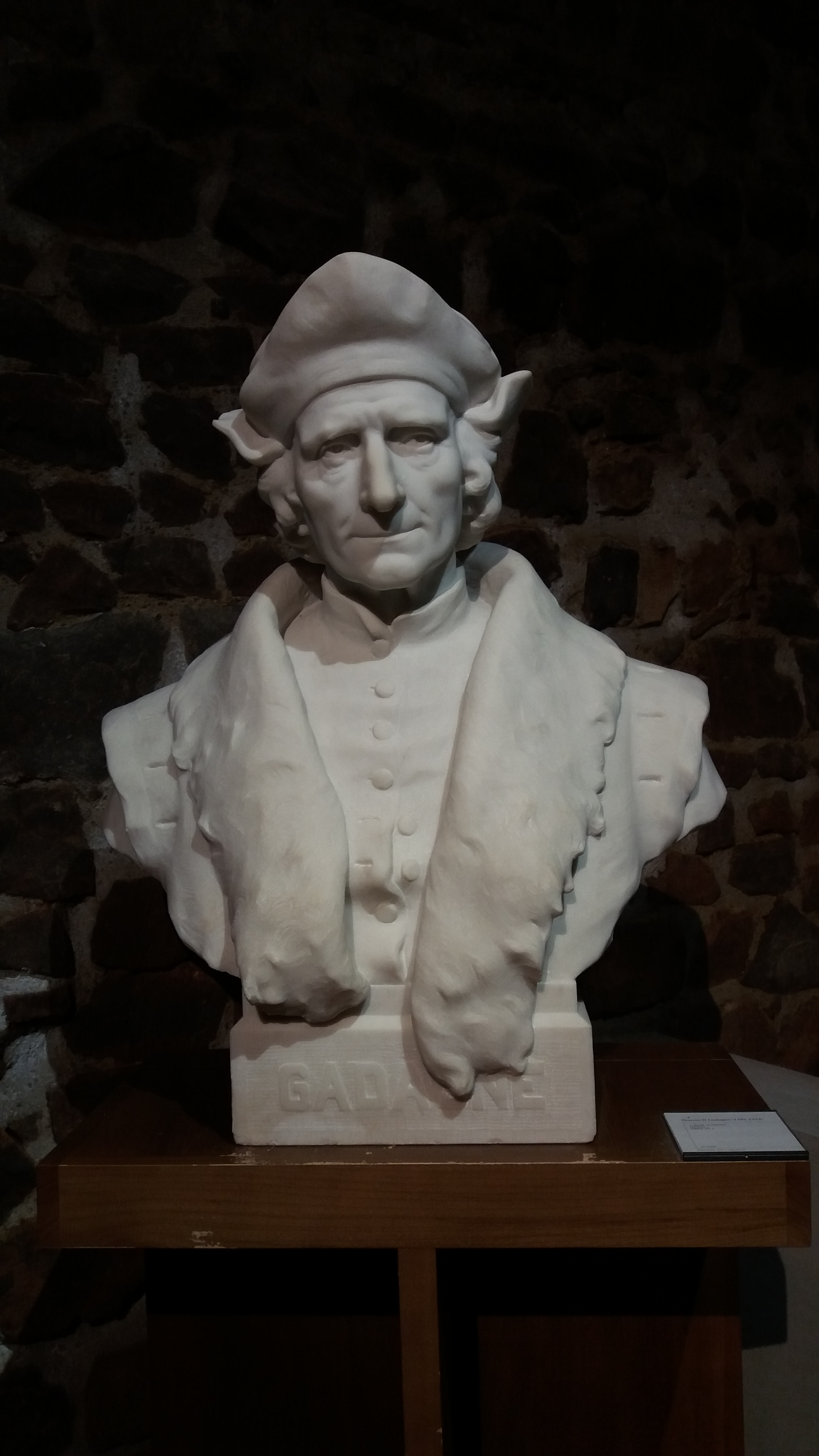
Bust of Thomas II de Gadagne

Thomas II de Gadagne, known as Thomas the Magnificent (1495, Florence - 1543, Avignon) was an Italian banker active in France.

== Life ==
He inherited a large fortune from his uncle Thomas I de Gadagne as well as solid commercial and financial positions. He increased this fortune, allowing him to lend to major French nobleman and even Francis I of France himself, who made him a counselor and 'maître d'hôtel ordinaire' in his household. In 1537 he founded the Basilique funéraire Saint-Laurent de Choulans hospital, with its pavillon Saint-Thomas for plague sufferers. He commissioned The Incredulity of Saint Thomas for his uncle's burial chapel.

Thomas II let out the hôtel de Gadagne to the Pierrevive family from 1538. His son Guillaume and Thomas III later became its owners from 1545 to 1581. He also owned the Beauregard estate in Saint-Genis-Laval, the Saint-Victor la Coste estate in the Comtat and the Hôtel de Sade in Avignon. He married Peronette Berti, with whom he had five children.

== Bibliography ==
- Baudouin-Matuszek, Marie-Noëlle; Ouvarov, Pavel (1991). "Banque et pouvoir au XVIe siècle : la surintendance des finances d'Albisse Del Bene". Bibliothèque de l'École des chartes (in French) (149–2): 249–291.
- Béghain, Patrice; Benoît, Bruno; Corneloup, Gérard (2009). Dictionnaire historique de Lyon (in French). Lyon: S. Bachès. OCLC 682037784. Notice BnF no FRBNF42001687
- Francou, Michel (2009). Armorial des florentins à Lyon à la Renaissance (in French). Lyon: Cosmogone. ISBN 978-2-8103-0020-4. OCLC 437049610.
- Gascon, Richard (1971). Grand commerce et vie urbaine au XVIe siècle : Lyon et ses marchands (environs de 1520-environs de 1580). Civilisations et sociétés (in French). Vol. II]. Paris: S.E.V.P.E.N. Mouton. OCLC 40346858. Notice BnF no FRBNF35371690
- Lejeune, Edouard (2004). La saga lyonnaise des Gadagne (in French). Lyon: Editions lyonnaises d'art et d'histoire. ISBN 2-84147-153-5. OCLC 55236680.
- Passerini, Luigi (1873). Genealogia e storia della famiglia Guadagni (in Italian). Firenze: M. Cellini. OCLC 681467133. Notice BnF no FRBNF31064839
- Rocke, M. (1955). The Guadagni of Florence : Family and Society. Medieval and Early Moderne Italy.
- Yver, Georges (1902). De Guadagniis (les Gadaigne) mercatoribus Florentinis Lugduni, XVIe p. Chr. n. saeculo, commorantibus (Thesis) (in Latin). Paris: Cerf. OCLC 247711761. Notice BnF no FRBNF31677741
