= The Incredulity of Saint Thomas (Salviati) =

Painting by Francesco Salviati

- The Incredulity of St. Thomas
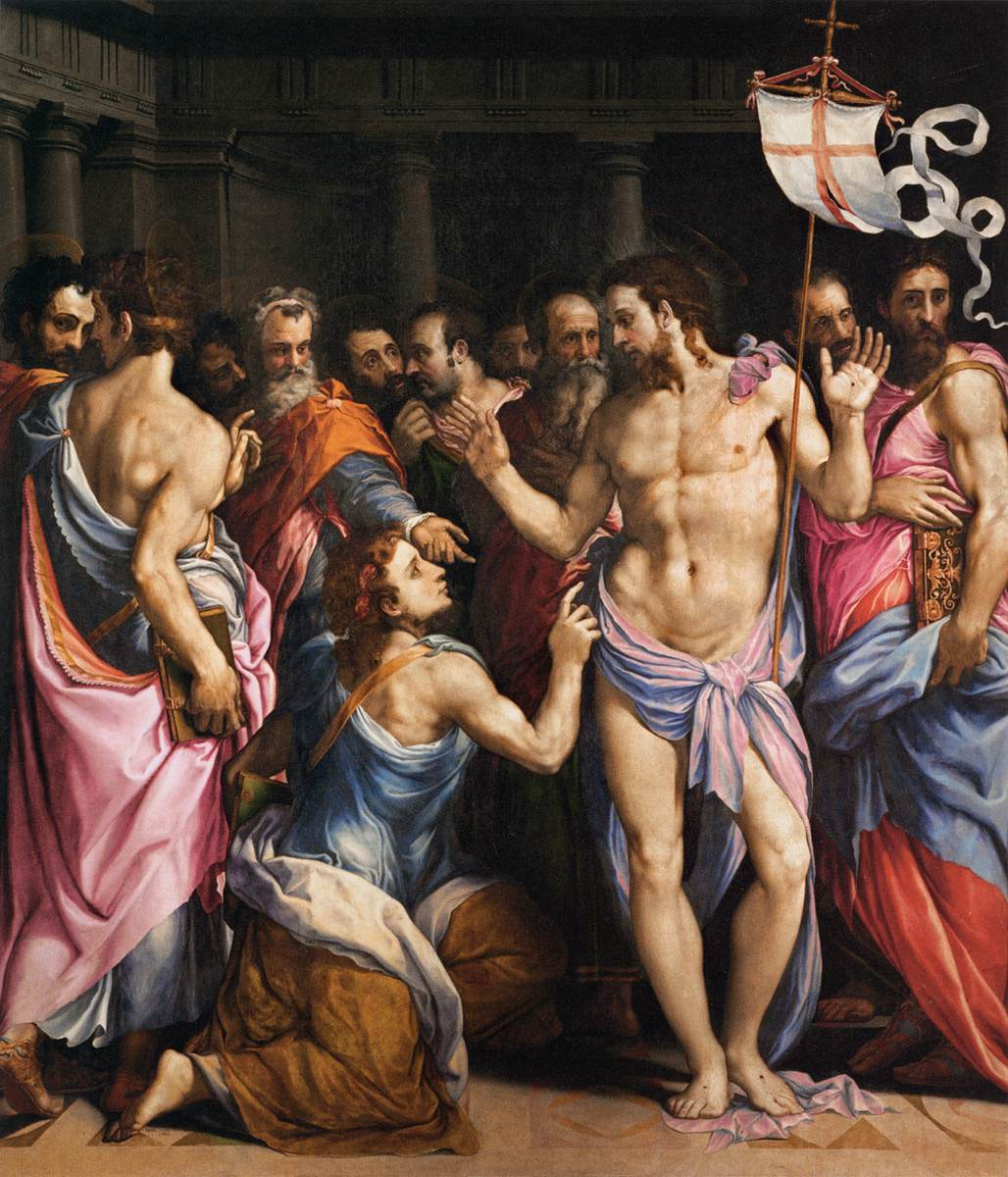
- Artist: Francesco Salviati
- Year: 1543–1547
- Dimensions: 275 cm (108 in) × 234 cm (92 in)
- Owner: French State
- Collection: Department of Paintings of the Louvre
- Identifiers: Joconde work ID: 000PE027030

The Incredulity of Saint Thomas is a 1543–1547 painting by Francesco Salviati. It was commissioned for the église Notre-Dame-de-Confort in Lyon by Thomas II de Gadagne (also known as Tomaso Guadagni), a Florentine counselor to Francis I of France. It is now held in the Louvre Museum and measures 275 cm by 234 cm. It is signed FRANCESCO SALVIATO FLO. OPUS (S.B.D.) and the apostle shown in three-quarter-profile is a self-portrait of Salviati.

Its choice of subject reflects an anti-Medici political viewpoint shared by commissioner and artist. The work proved popular from its arrival in Lyon onwards and was copied by several artists in several media, including an engraving by Master CC. Even after art history began to neglect art produced in and for Lyon, the painting was one of few such works still to be mentioned - for example, it appears in Giorgio Vasari's Lives.

== Bibliography ==
- Elsig, Frédéric (2014). Peindre à Lyon au XVIe siècle (in French). Milan: Silvana Editoriale. ISBN 978-88-366-2768-4. OCLC 880552249. Notice BnF no FRBNF43834242) — Ouvrage issu d'un colloque international tenu à Genève les 26 et 27 octobre 2012 organisé par le Musée d’art et d’histoire de Genève, l'Université de Genève et Uni Bastions.
- Virassamynaïken, Ludmila, ed. (2015). Lyon Renaissance : arts et humanisme (in French). Lyon: Musée des beaux-arts. ISBN 978-2-7572-0991-2. OCLC 930148316.
- Salviati, Francesco; Monbeig-Goguel, Catherine (1998). Francesco Salviati (1510-1563), ou, La bella maniera : Rome, Villa Médicis 28 janvier-29 mars 1998 : Paris, Musée du Louvre 30 avril-29 juin 1998 (in French). Paris: Editions de la Réunion des musées nationaux. ISBN 2-7118-3513-8. OCLC 39066418.
