= Francesco Salviati (painter) =

Italian painter

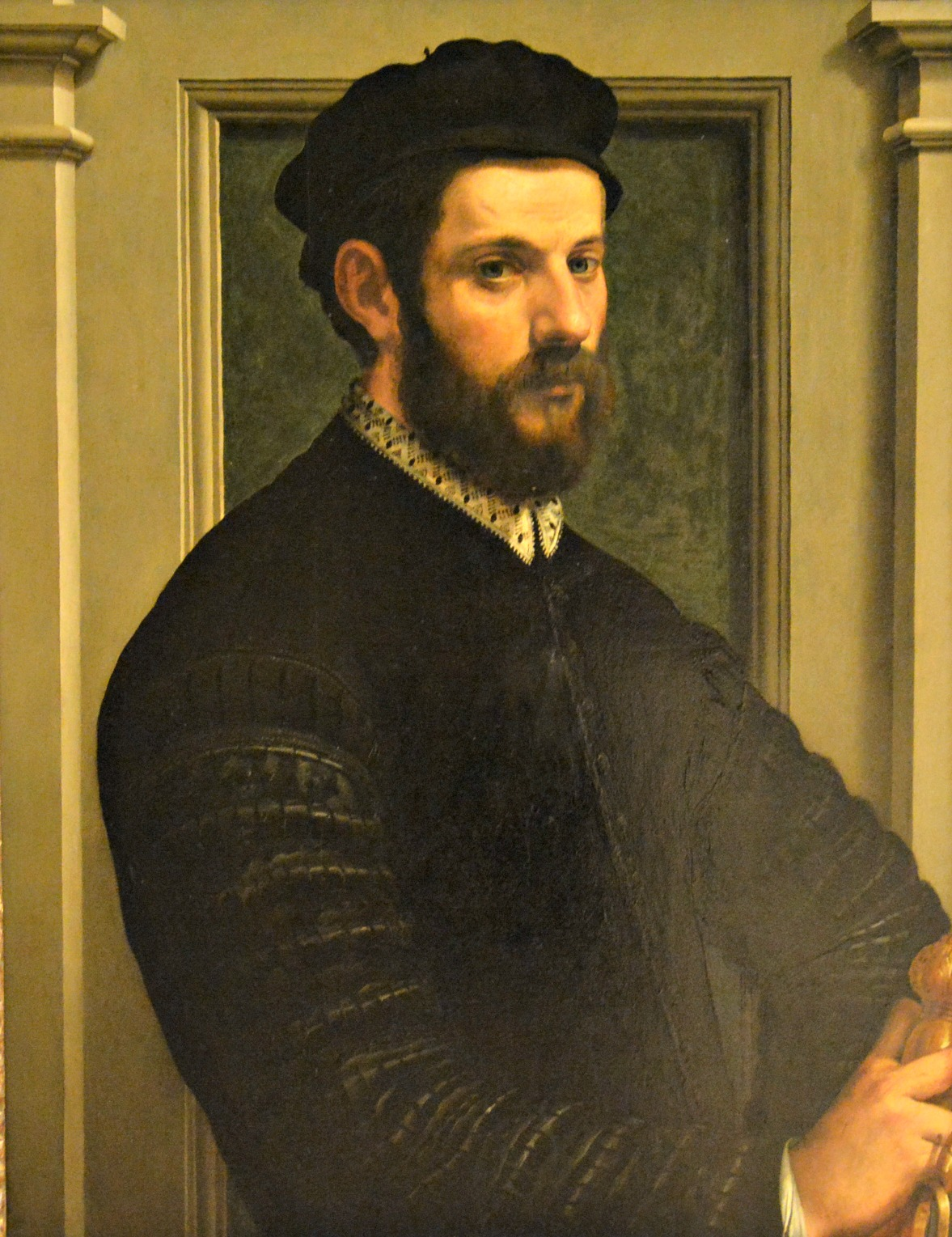
- Self-portrait (1540–1549), Museo di Capodimonte, Naples
- Born: Francesco de' Rossi; 1510; Florence, Republic of Florence
- Died: 11 November 1563 (aged 52–53); Rome, Papal States
- Notable work: The Incredulity of Saint Thomas
- Movement: Mannerism

Francesco Salviati or Francesco de' Rossi (1510 – 11 November 1563) was an Italian Mannerist painter who lived and worked in Florence, with periods in Bologna and Venice, ending with a long period in Rome, where he died. He is known by various names, usually the adopted one of Francesco Salviati or Il Salviati, after an early patron, but also Francesco Rossi and Cecchino del Salviati.

He worked in fresco and oils, on ambitious history paintings, but also painted many portraits, and designed tapestries for the Medici.

== Biography ==
Salviati was born in Florence, Italy. He apprenticed under Giuliano Bugiardini, Baccio Bandinelli, Andrea del Brescianino, and finally (in 1529–1530) Andrea del Sarto. In 1531, he travelled to Rome, where he met another pupil of Bandinelli's, Giorgio Vasari, and helped to complete the frescoes on the Life of John the Baptist in the Palazzo Salviati for his patron, the Cardinal Giovanni Salviati. It is from his attachment to this household that he took on the surname.

In Rome, he frescoed an Annunciation in the church of San Francesco a Ripa (1533–1535). His mature style has Mannerist contortions and crowded scenes similar to the output of Giulio Romano. In 1538 he joined Jacopino del Conte, completing a fresco of the Visitation for the Oratory of San Giovanni Battista Decollato in Rome, the church of a Florentine fraternity ministering to persons who had been condemned to execution.

Salviati painted in Bologna in 1540 alongside Vasari, and stayed for a brief time in Venice, where he frescoed decorations for the Palazzo Grimani di Santa Maria Formosa in an antique style. During this period, his style shows the influences of Parmigianino. His many portrait paintings can sometimes be confused for Bronzino.

In 1543, Salviati returned to Florence. Working for Cosimo I de' Medici, Grand Duke of Tuscany, he completed a fresco decoration eulogising the Medici family (the Triumph of Camillus in the Sala dell'Udienza of the Palazzo Vecchio, 1543–1545). He also designed tapestry cartoons for the recently established Arazzeria, including Ecce Homo, the Resurrection, and Joseph explains the Pharaoh's dreams. The latter commission was awarded after a competition, which pitted him against his contemporary Florentine Mannerists Bronzino and Pontormo. He painted a Deposition altarpiece for Santa Croce in 1547–1548. This crowded and complex subject was a key one for Italian painters of the Late Renaissance.

He often travelled to Rome between 1548 and 1563, to complete various fresco series, such as the Wedding at Cana in the Oratory of the Piceni, a Birth of John the Baptist in the Oratory of San Giovanni Battista Decollato, in the Palazzo della Cancelleria (Pallium Cappella), in the Palazzo Sacchetti (Life of David), and in the Palazzo Farnese.

He died in Rome on 11 November 1563.

== Collections ==
Many of his larger works are still in situ, and the Cleveland Museum of Art, the Courtauld Institute of Art, the J. Paul Getty Museum, Harvard University Art Museums, the Hermitage Museum, the Honolulu Museum of Art, the Liechtenstein Museum (Vienna), the Louvre, the Metropolitan Museum of Art, the Museo Poldi Pezzoli (Milan), Museum der bildenden Künste (Leipzig), the Museum of Fine Arts, Boston, the National Gallery of Art (Washington, DC), the Pinacoteca di Brera (Milan), the Ringling Museum of Art (Florida), the Royal Museums of Fine Arts of Belgium, the Saint Louis Art Museum, the Prado Museum (Madrid), the Toledo Museum of Art (Ohio), and the Uffizi are among the public collections holding paintings by Salviati.

== Gallery ==
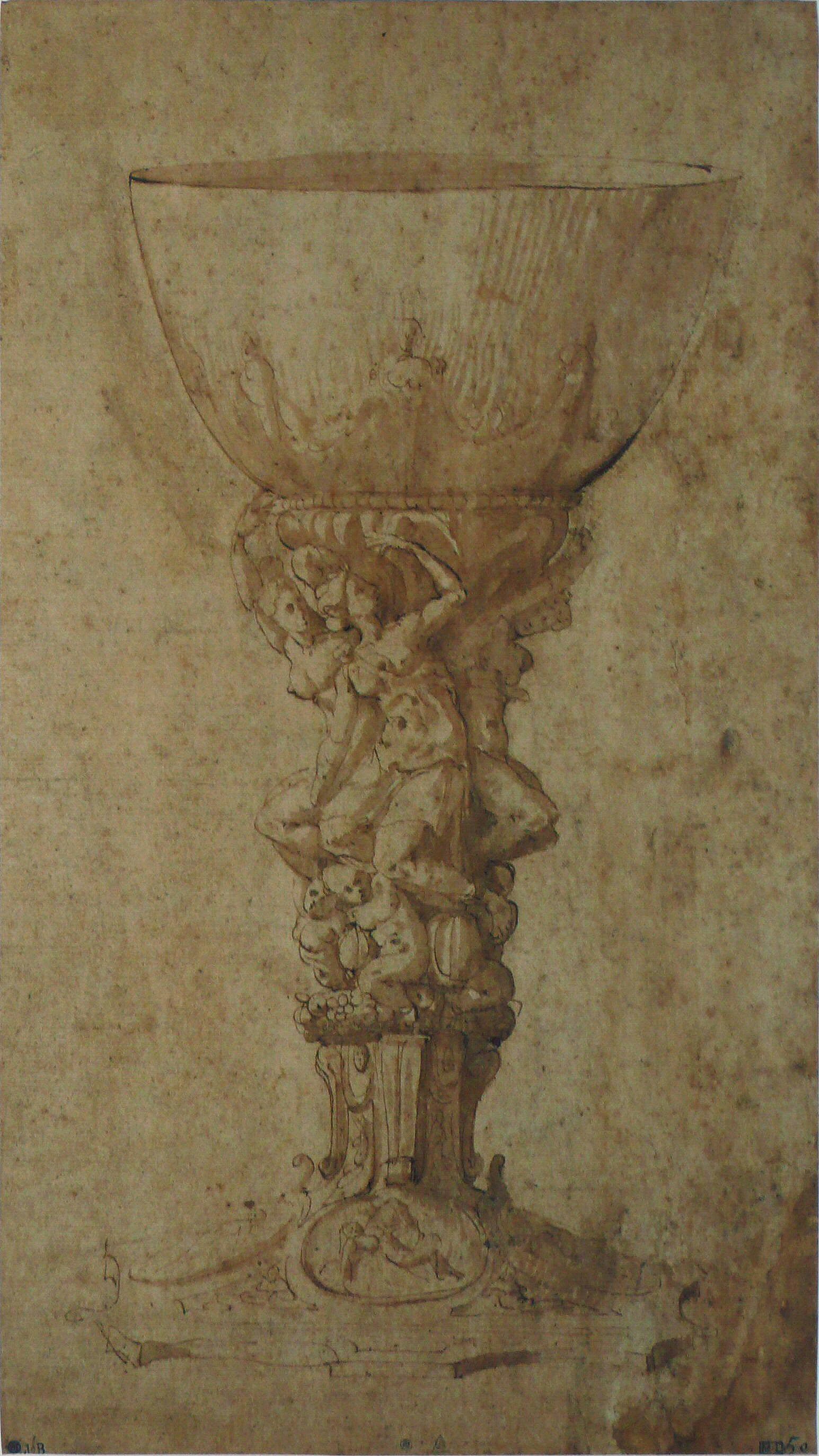
Chalice, 1530s, Louvre

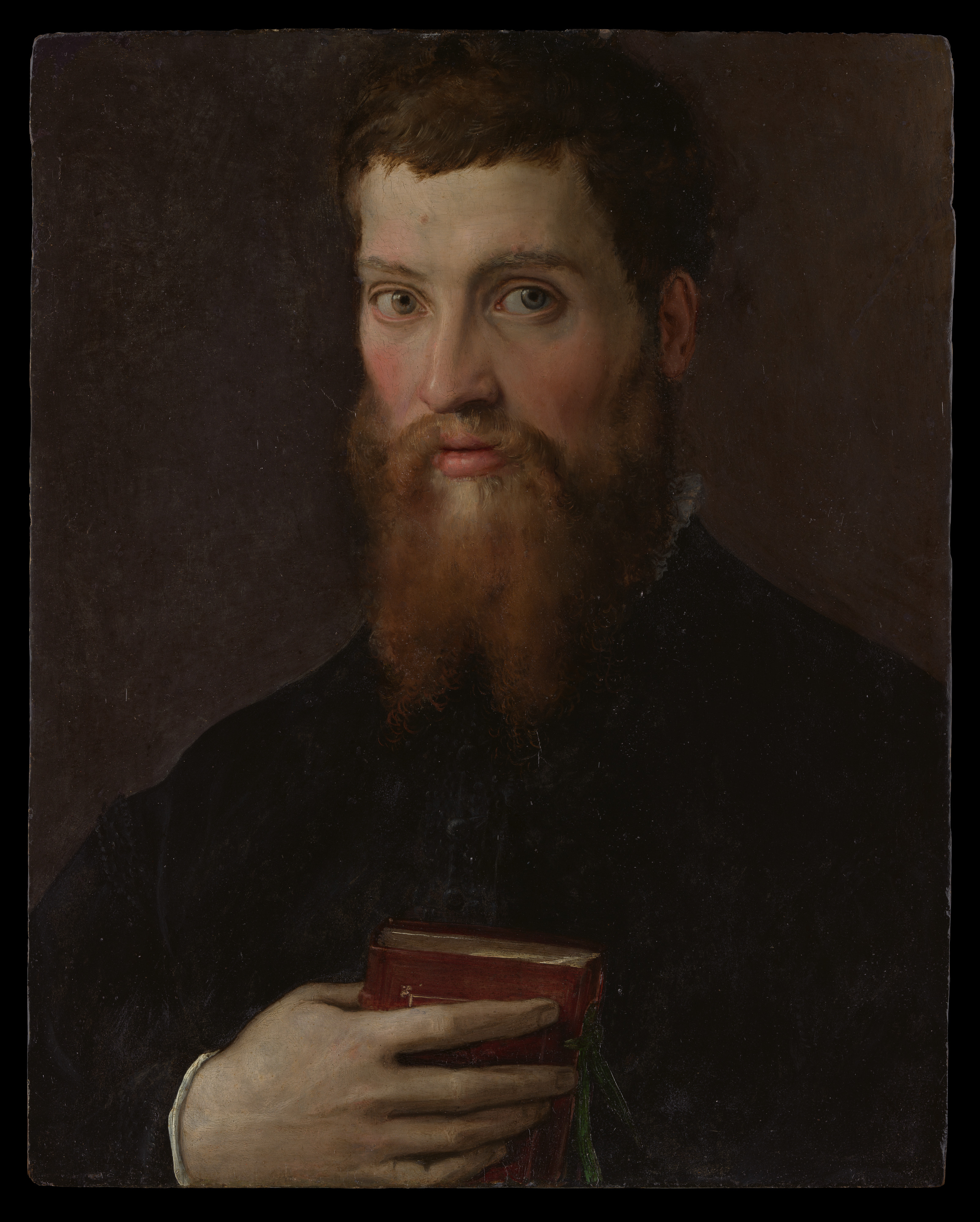
Portrait of Carlo Rimbotti, 1548, oil on wood, Metropolitan Museum of Art

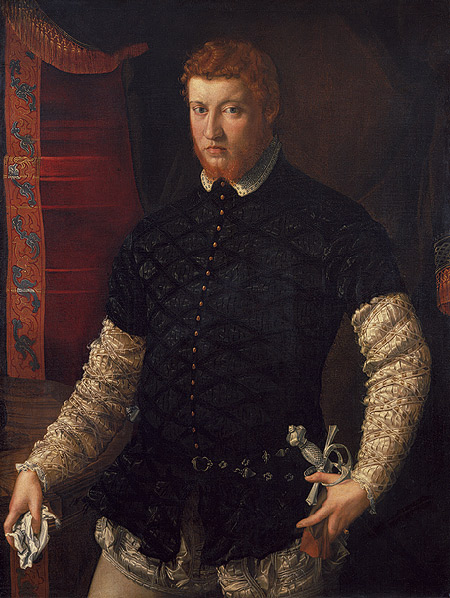
Portrait of a Man, 1540–1550, Metropolitan Museum of Art

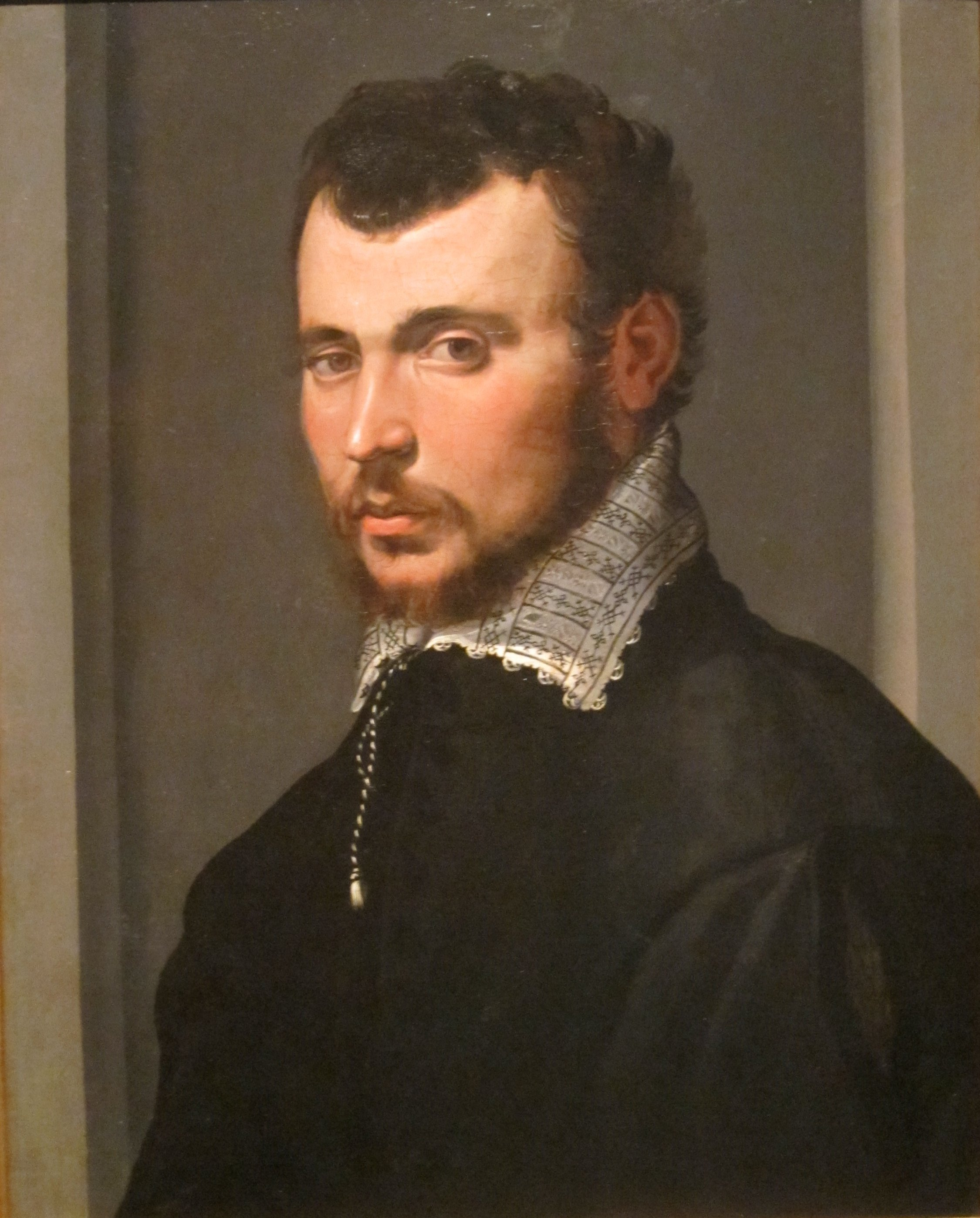
Portrait of a Young Man, oil on canvas, c. 1550, Honolulu Museum of Art

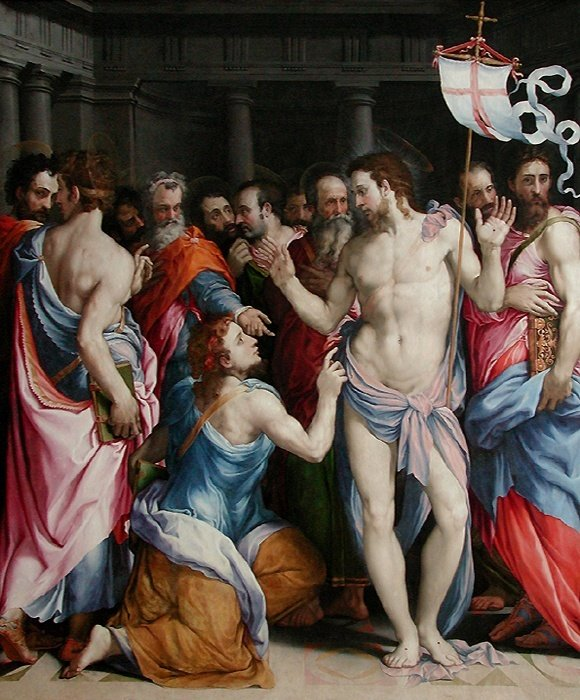
The Incredulity of Saint Thomas, 1543–1547, Louvre

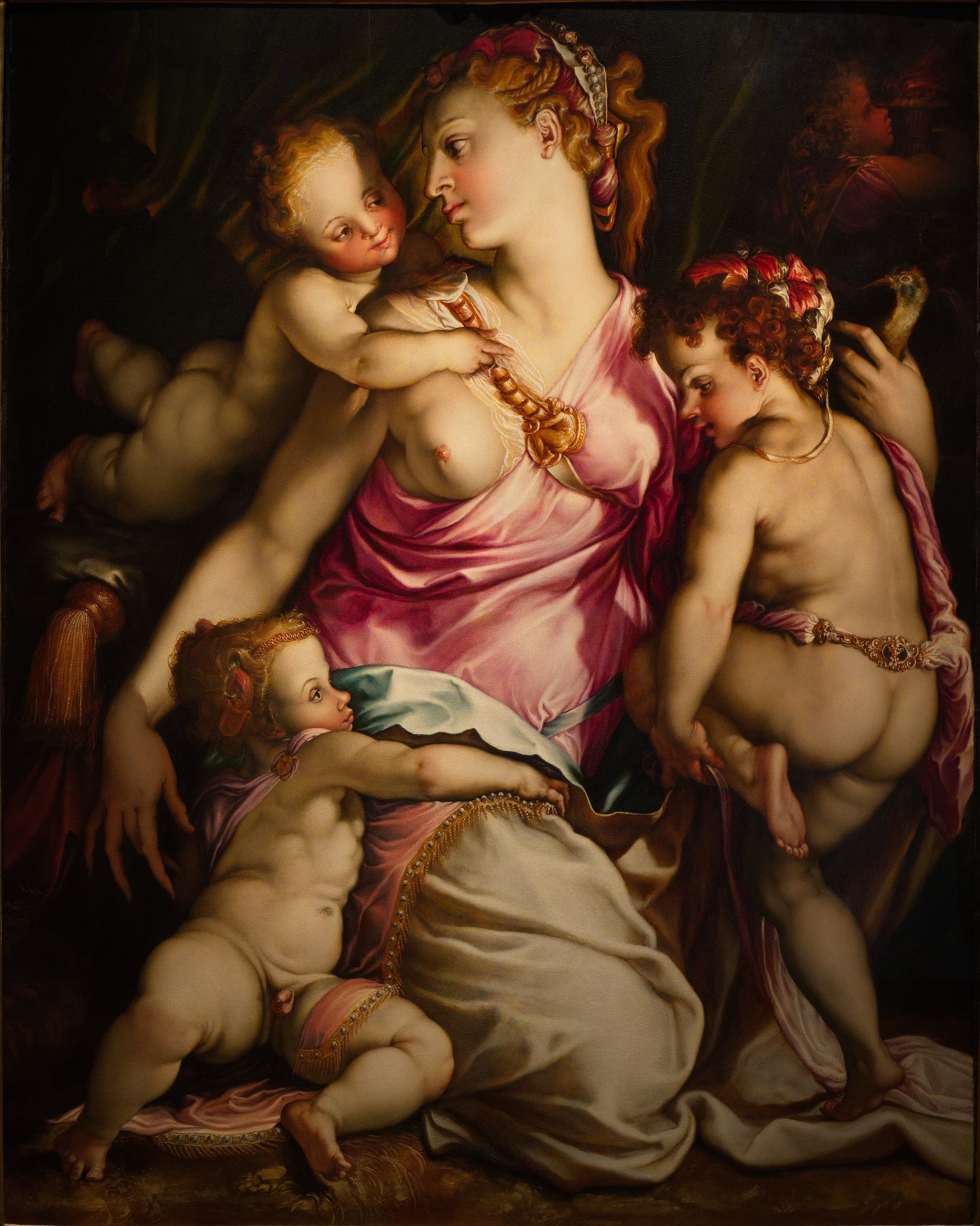
Charity, 1544–1548, Uffizi

== Sources ==
- Freedberg, Sydney J. (1993). Pelican History of Art (ed.). Painting in Italy, 1500–1600. Penguin Books. pp. 437–442.
