= List of people from Lyon =

This is a list of notable people associated with the French city of Lyon, Rhône.

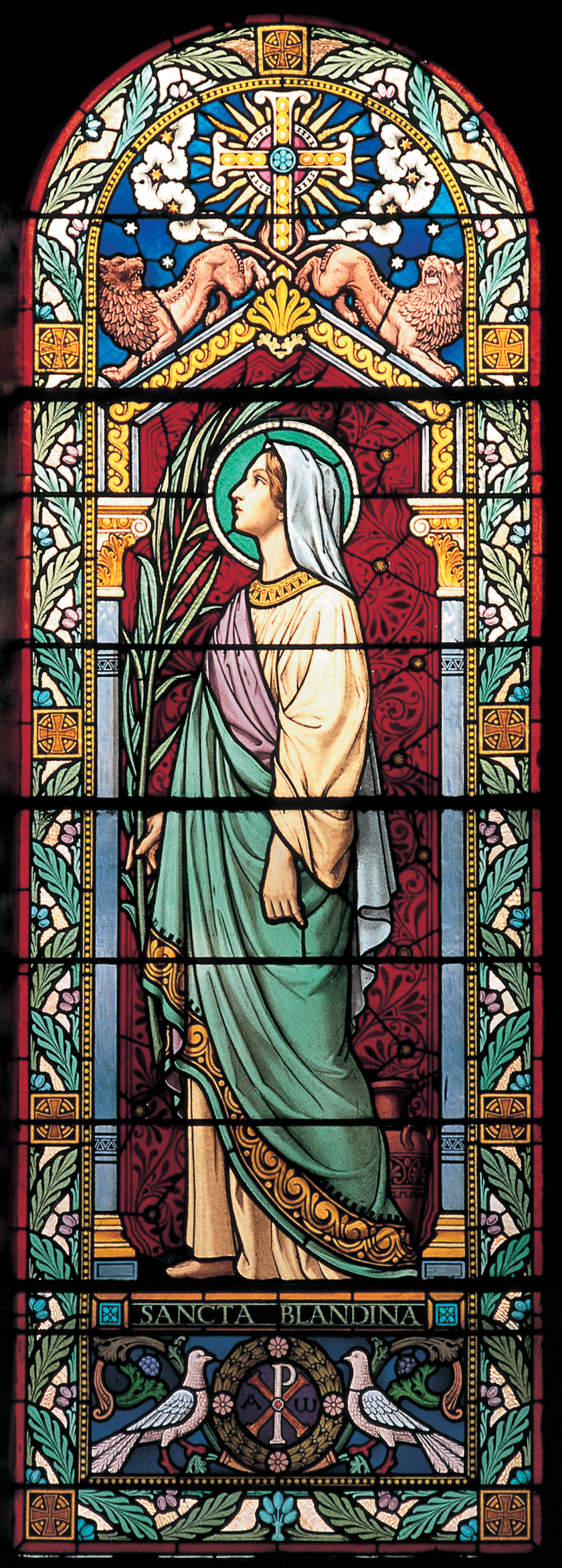
Sainte Blandine in St Irenaus Church

== Religious figures ==
- Saint Blandine (162–177 AD) – Christian martyr
- Irenaeus (2nd century AD–202) – Bishop of Lugdunum in Gaul and early Christian martyr
- Sidonius Apollinaris (430–489) – poet, diplomat, bishop
- Pierre Coton (1564–1626) – Jesuit confessor to kings Henry IV and Louis XIII
- Alexandre Lanfant (1726–1792) – French Jesuit
- Pierre-Simon Ballanche (1776–1847) – Christian philosopher
- André Coindre (1787–1826) – founder of the order of the Brothers of the Sacred Heart
- Mathias Loras (1792–1858) – first bishop of the diocese in Dubuque, Iowa
- Jean-Baptiste Pompallier (1801–1871) – bishop
- Allan Kardec (1804–1869) – systematizer of Spiritism
- Abbé Pierre (1912–2007) – founder of the Emmaus Mouvement
- Shlomo Aviner (born 1943) – religious Zionist rabbi

== Financial figures ==
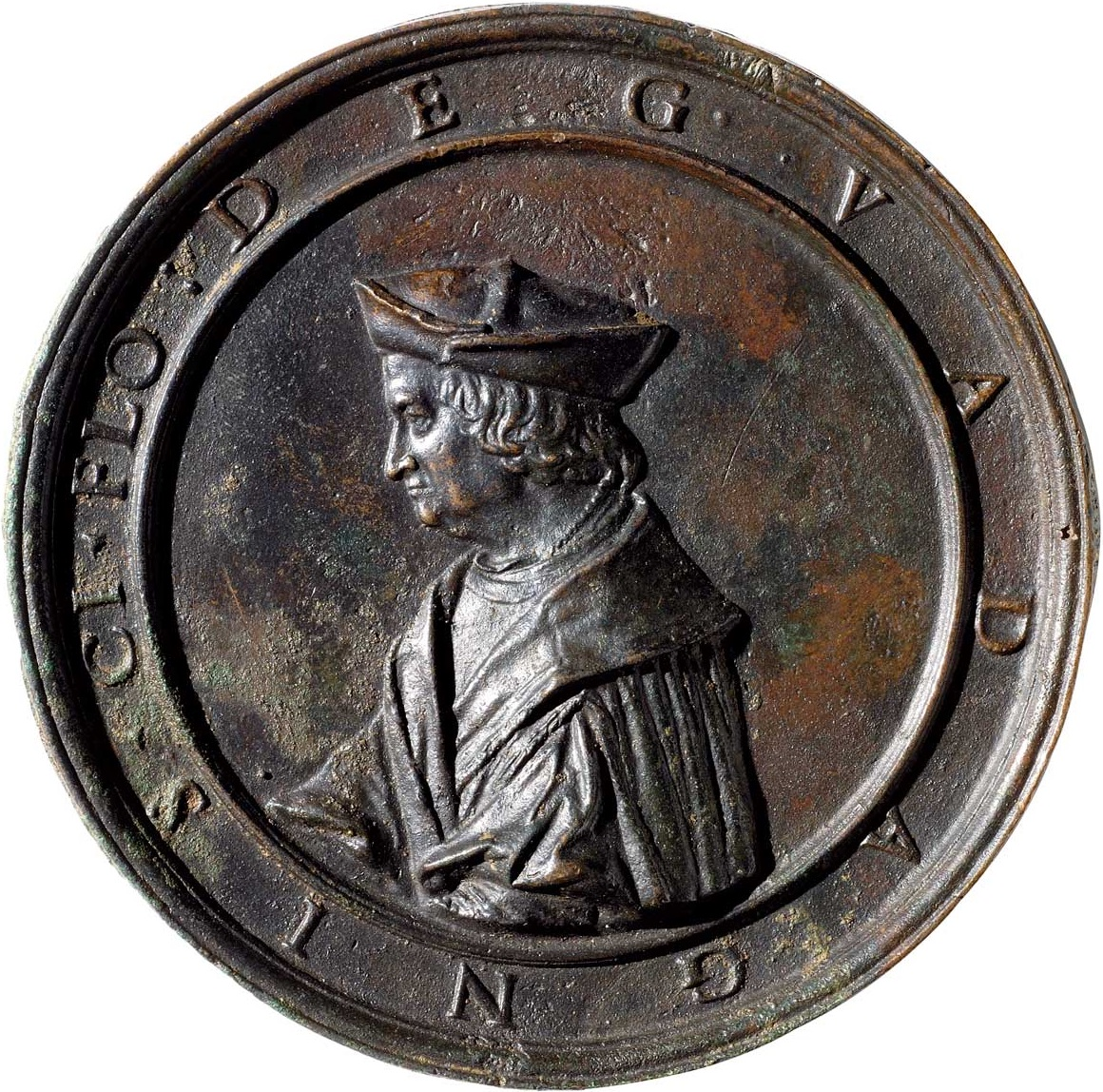
Thomas the Rich, banker during the golden age of the Lyon fairs

- Thomas I de Gadagne (1454-1533) – banker
- Abbé Terray (1715–1778) – controller general of finance under Louis XVI
- Jean-Claude Trichet (born 1942) – president of Banque de France and European Central Bank
- Jérôme Kerviel (born 1977) – trader
- Ernest Cadgene (1879-1934) – businessman

== Political figures ==
- Claudius (10 BC–54 AD) – Roman emperor
- Caracalla (186–217) – Roman emperor
- Jules Favre (1809–1880) – Republican statesman
- Étienne Rognon (1869-1948) – politician
- Édouard Herriot (1872–1957) – French Prime Minister
- Raymond Barre (1924-2007) – French politician
- Dominique Perben (born 1945) – politician
- Gérard Collomb (born 1947) – politician and former mayor of Lyon
- Azouz Begag (born 1957) – writer and politician

== Military and French Resistance figures ==
- Claude Martin (1735–1800) – soldier, colonial official, and posthumous founder of La Martinière College
- Louis Gabriel Suchet (1770–1826) – marshal of France
- Fleury Marius (1896–1972) – aviator
- Jean Moulin (1899–1943) – French Resistance leader
- Madeleine Lavigne (1912–1945) – French resistance and agent for the Special Operations Executive

== Surgeons, scientists, inventors ==
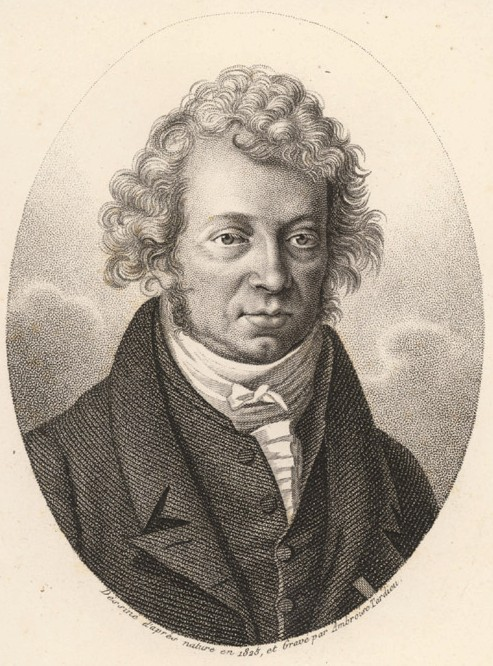
André-Marie Ampère

- André-Marie Ampère (1775–1836) – physicist
- Pierre Bouchet (1752–1794) – head surgeon at Hôtel-Dieu
- Joseph Gensoul (1797–1858) – surgeon
- Théodore Herpin (1799–1865) – physician known for his work involving epilepsy
- Stephane Javelle (1864–1917) – astronomer
- Edmond Locard (1877–1966) – pioneer in forensic science
- Gerard Bérchet (1902–1990) – inventor of nylon and neoprene
- Alain Mérieux (born 1938) – billionaire founder of Lyon's BSL-4 Laboratory

== Architects and urban planners ==
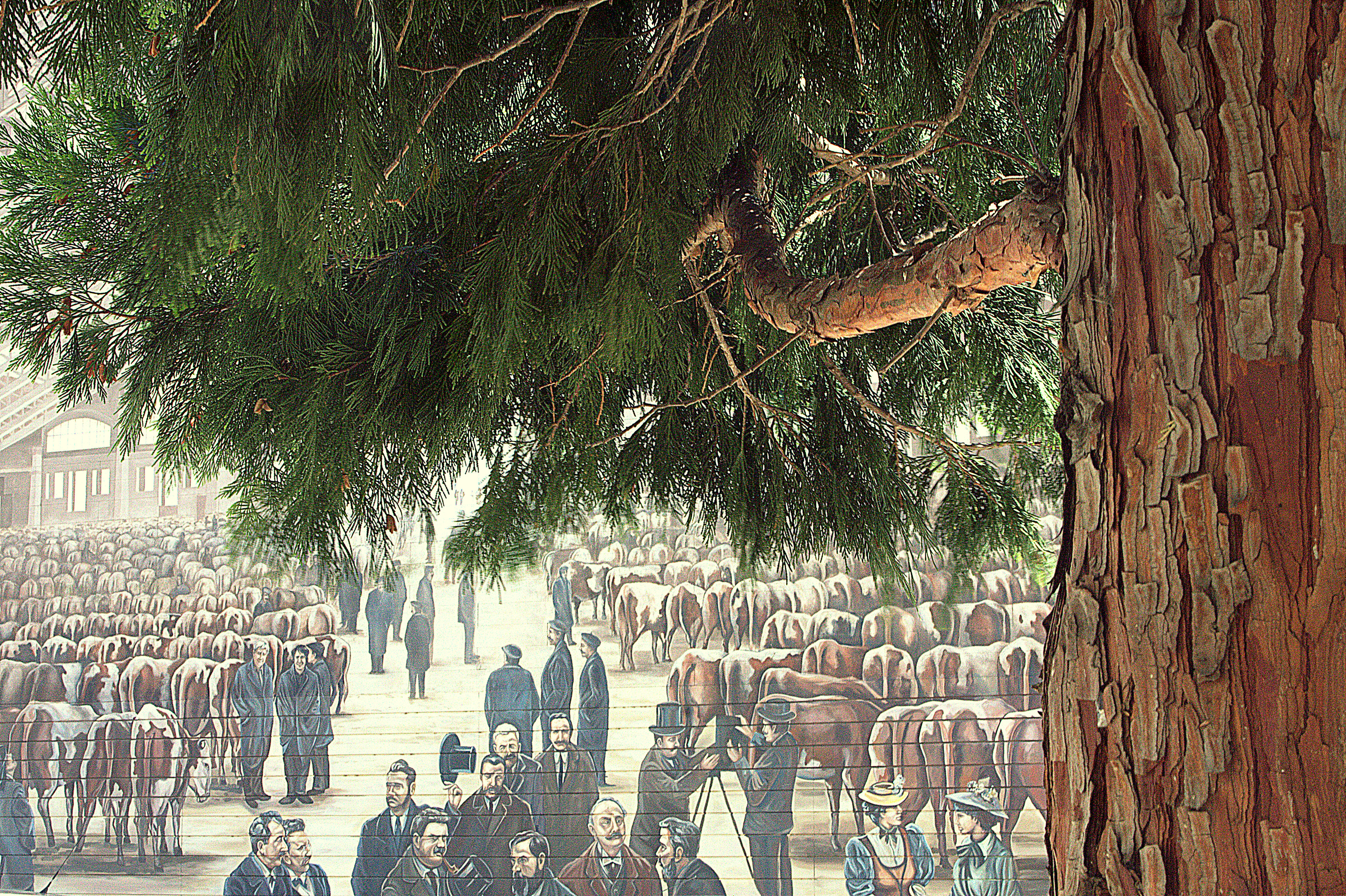
Tony Garnier with Édouard Herriot at the Abattoirs de la Mouche (Tony Garnier Museum)

- Hector Guimard (1867–1942) – Art Nouveau architect
- Tony Garnier (1869–1948) – architect and urban planner

== Authors and journalists ==
- François Rabelais (1494–1553) – writer
- Maurice Scève (c. 1500–c. 1564) – poet
- Jeanne de La Saulcée (died 1559), publisher, printer, bookseller
- Louise Labé (c. 1520–1566) – poet
- André Morellet (1727–1819) – economist and writer
- Jean-Baptiste Say (1767–1832) – economist and businessman
- Juliette Récamier (1777–1849) – salonnière, writer
- Alphonse Balleydier (1810–1859) – historiographer
- Joanny Augier (1813–1855) – playwright and journalist
- Alexandre Lacassagne (1843–1924) – criminologist
- Louis Maynard (1871–1940) – writer and local historian
- Louis Jalabert (1877–1943) – Jesuit archaeologist and epigrapher
- Antoine de Saint-Exupéry (1900–1944) – aviation pioneer and writer
- Jean-Marc Théolleyre (1924–2011) – journalist
- Marie de Hennezel (born 1946) – psychologist, psychotherapist and writer
- Pierre Autin-Grenier (1947–2014) – writer
- Yves Bonnardel (born 1967) – activist, philosopher, writer and editor
- Daphné Collignon (born 1977) – comic book author

== Artists and chefs ==
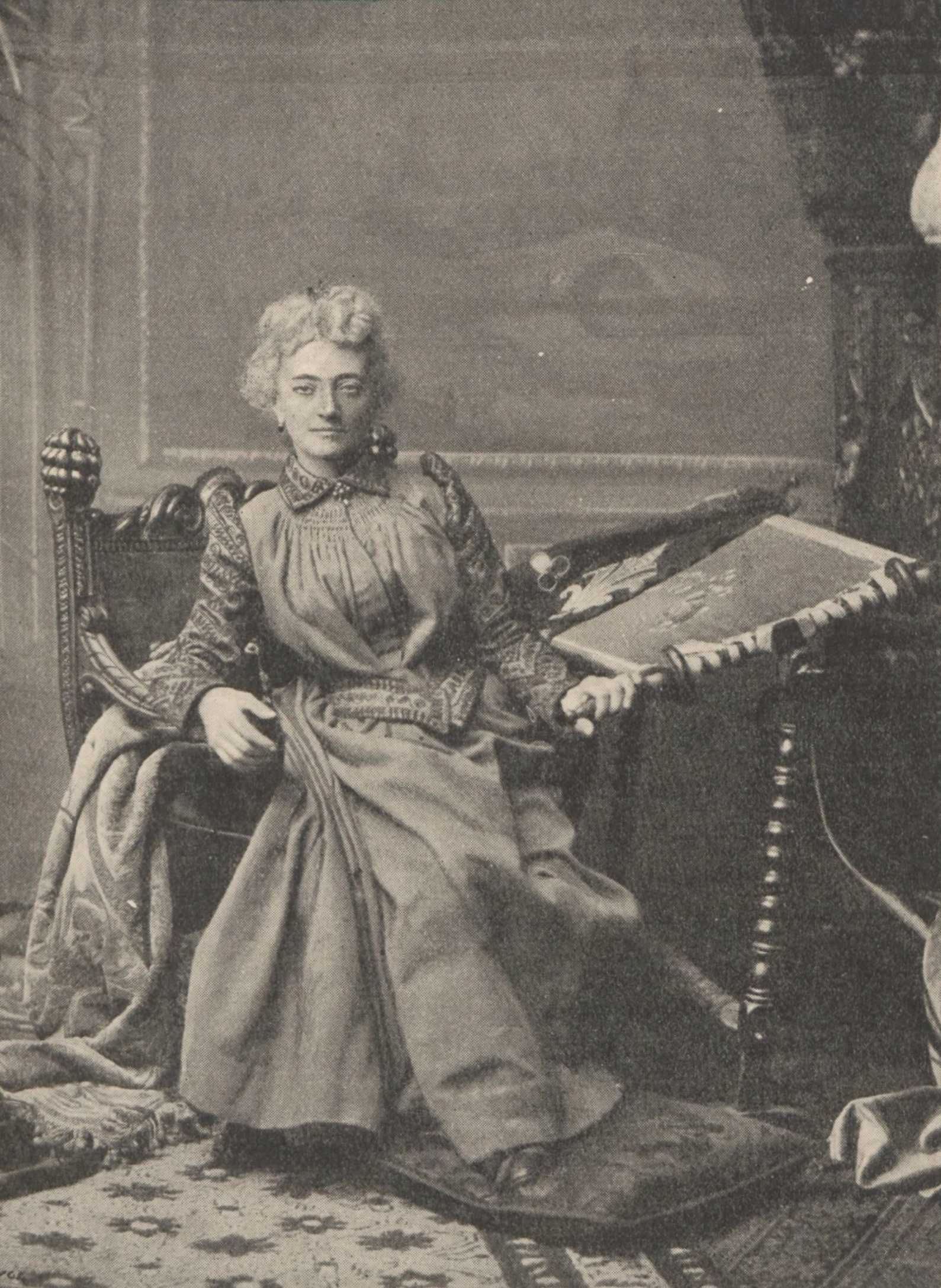
Marie-Anne Leroudier, embroiderer whose works can be seen at the Textile Arts Museum

- Jean-Baptiste Bertrand (1823–1887) – painter
- Paul Bocuse (1926–2018) – chef
- Jean-François Bony (1754–1825) – artist
- Fanny Charrin (1781–1854) – painter
- Marie-Anne Leroudier (1838–1908) – embroiderer
- Pierre Puvis de Chavannes (1824–1898) – painter
- André César Vermare (1869–1949) – sculptor

== Cinema, theatre, television ==
- Laurent Mourguet (1769–1884) – puppeteer, creator of Guignol
- Cristine Roux (1820–1863) – courtesan, artist's model and actress
- Auguste and Louis Lumière (1862–1954; 1864–1948) – inventors of the cinematograph
- Bernard Pivot (born 1935) – journalist, television personality
- Bertrand Tavernier (1941–2021) – film director
- Clovis Cornillac (born 1967) – actor
- Éric Guirado (born 1968) – film director and writer
- Florence Foresti (born 1973) – humorist
- Jean-Baptiste Maunier (born 1990) – actor
- Sylvie Testud (born 1971) – actress
- Alexandre Astier (born 1974) – actor, scriptwriter, film director, editor, composer, comedian, musician and humorist

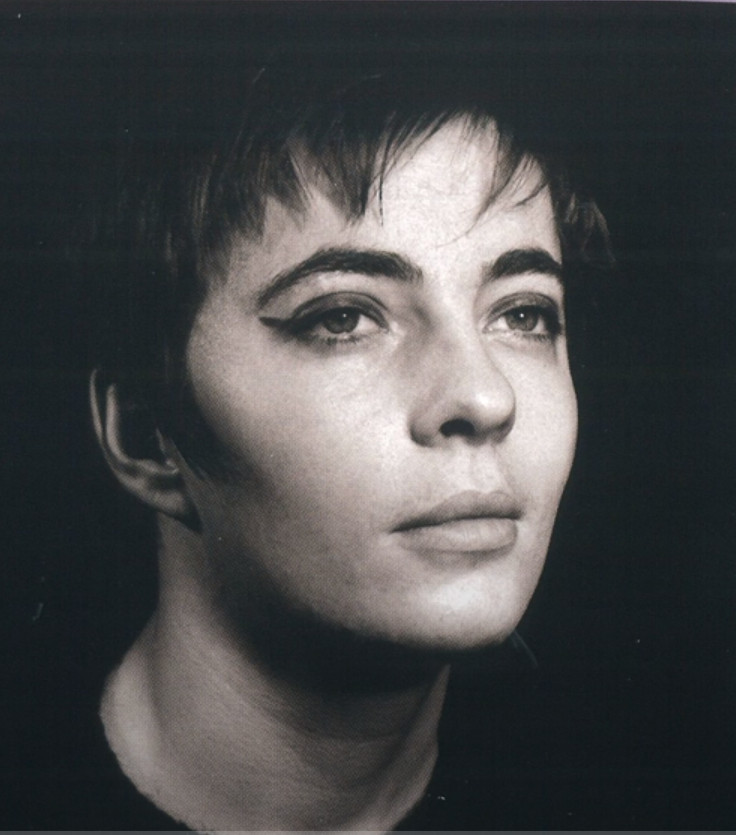
Gribouille, whose sidewalk art led to her first break in Paris

== Musicians ==
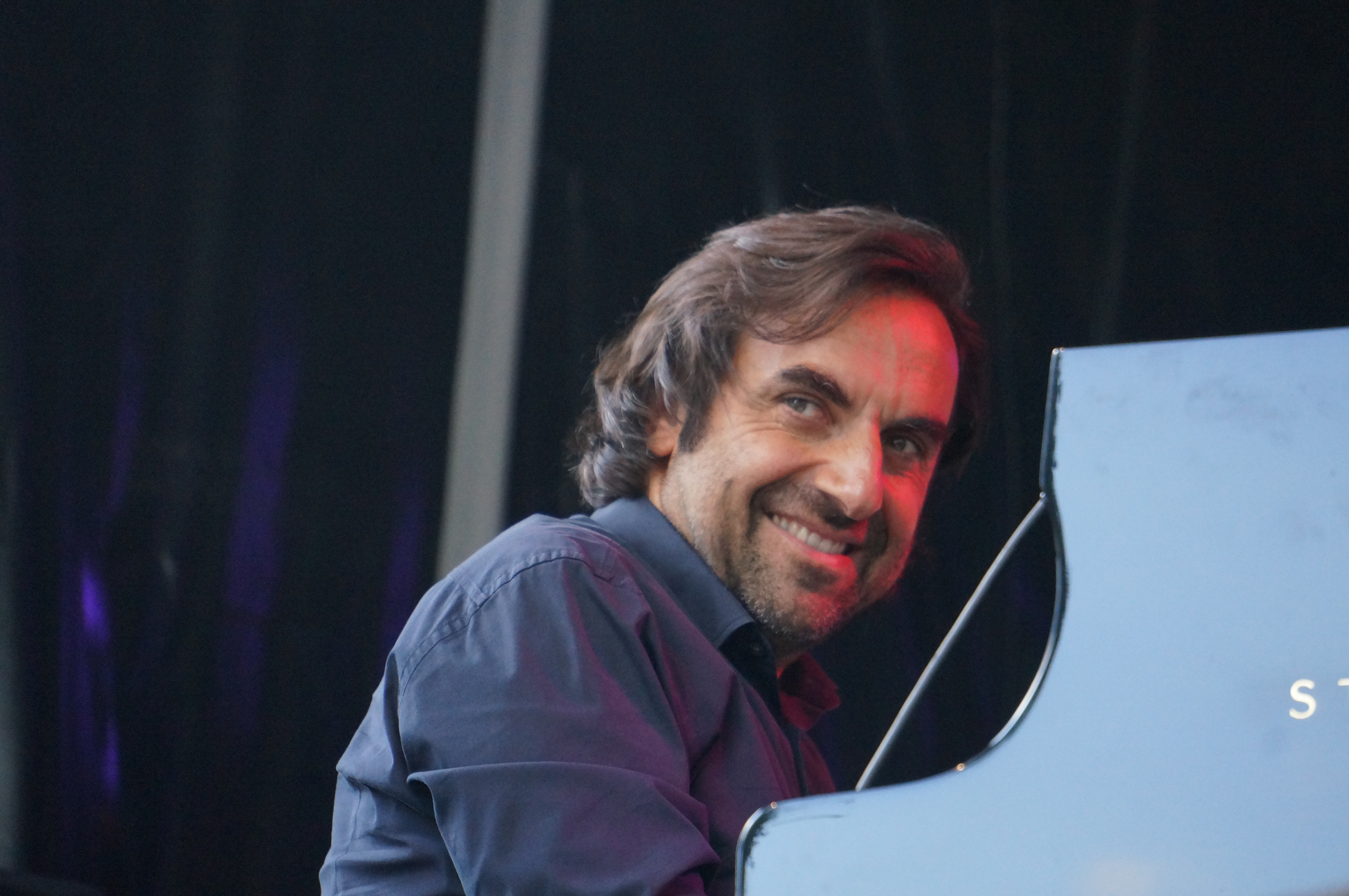
André Manoukian, musician and television personality

- Marc Burty (1827–1903) – music teacher, composer
- Charles-Marie Widor (1844–1937) – organist, composer and conductor
- Louise Janssen (1863–1938) – opera singer
- Marie Charbonnel (1880–1969) – opera singer
- Adrien Rougier (1892–1984) – organist, composer and conductor
- Maurice Jarre (1924–2009) – composer
- Pierre Monichon (1925–2006) – inventor of the Harmoneon and professor of historical musicology
- Marie-France Gaite (1941–1968) – singer
- Jean-Michel Jarre (born 1948) – electronic musician
- Pierre-Laurent Aimard (born 1957) – pianist
- André Manoukian (born 1957) – musician
- Jean-Yves Thibaudet (born 1961) – pianist
- Liane Foly (born 1962) – singer, humorist and actress
- Natalie Dessay (born 1965) – opera singer
- Jason Kouchak (born 1967) – pianist, composer
- David Charvet (born 1972) – actor and singer
- Frank Rivoire (born 1984) – electronic musician
- Mike Lévy (born 1985) – electronic musician

== Sports figures ==
- Eric Abidal (born 1979) – football player
- Houssem Aouar (born 1998) – football player
- Frederique Bangué (born 1976) – athlete
- Karim Benzema (born 1987) – football player
- Farès Chaïbi (born 2002) – football player
- Rayan Cherki (born 2003) – football player
- Youri Djorkaeff (born 1968) – football player
- Raymond Domenech (born 1952) – football trainer and manager
- Hubert Dupont (born 1980) – professional cyclist
- Ludovic Giuly (born 1976) – football player
- Maurice Herzog (1919–2012) – mountaineer
- Anthoine Hubert (1996–2019) – racing driver
- Alexandre Lacazette (born 1991) – football player
- Bernard Lacombe (born 1952) – football player
- Amine Noua (born 1997) – basketball player in the Israeli Basketball Premier League
- Émile Ntamack (born 1970) – rugby union player
- Olivier Panis (born 1966) – Formula One racing driver
- Gwendal Peizerat (born 1972) – ice dancer
- Pauline Peyraud-Magnin (born 1992) – football player
- Paul Seixas (born 2006) – professional cyclist
- Milan Thomas (born 1986) – football player
- Samuel Umtiti (born 1993) – football player

== Gallery ==
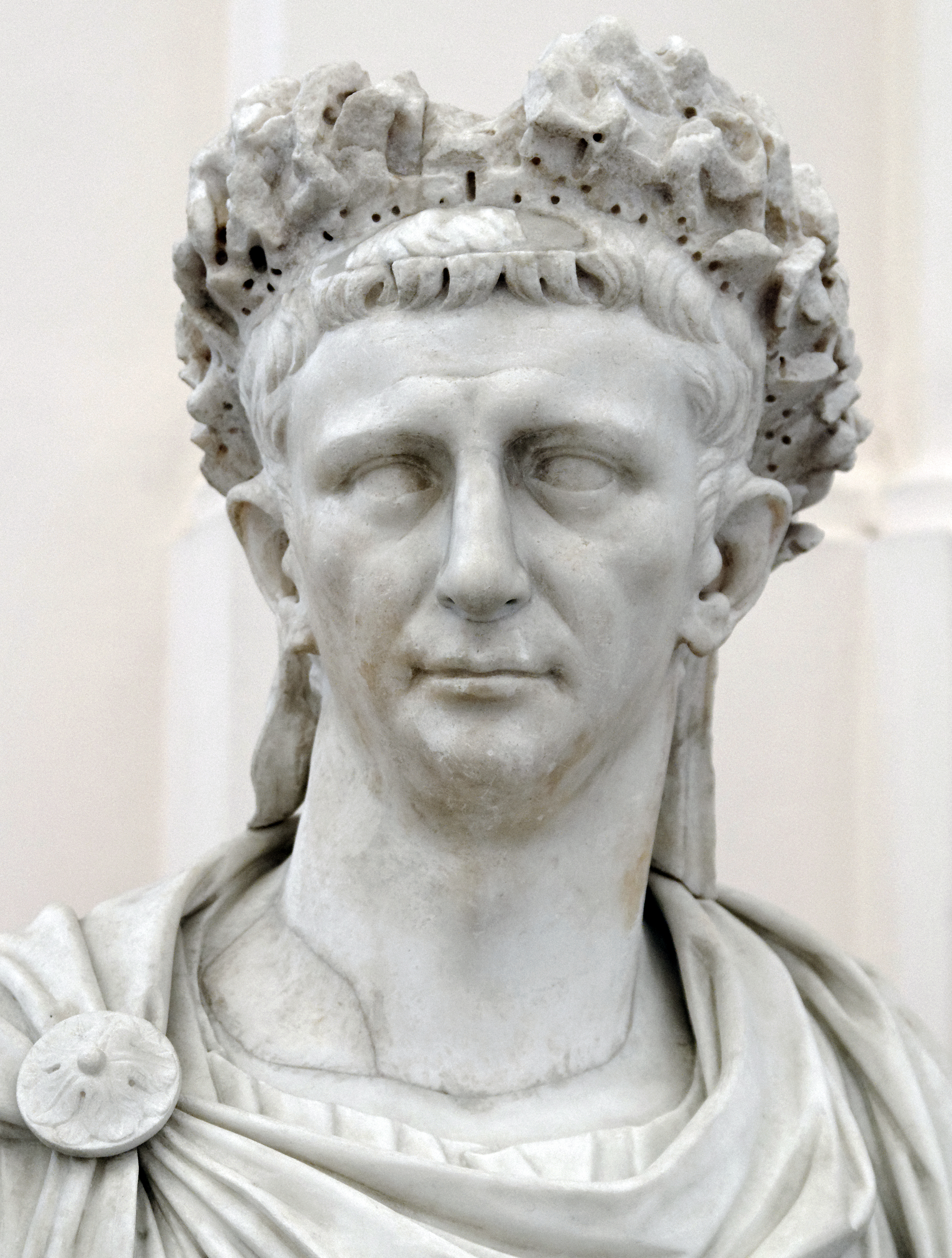
Claudius

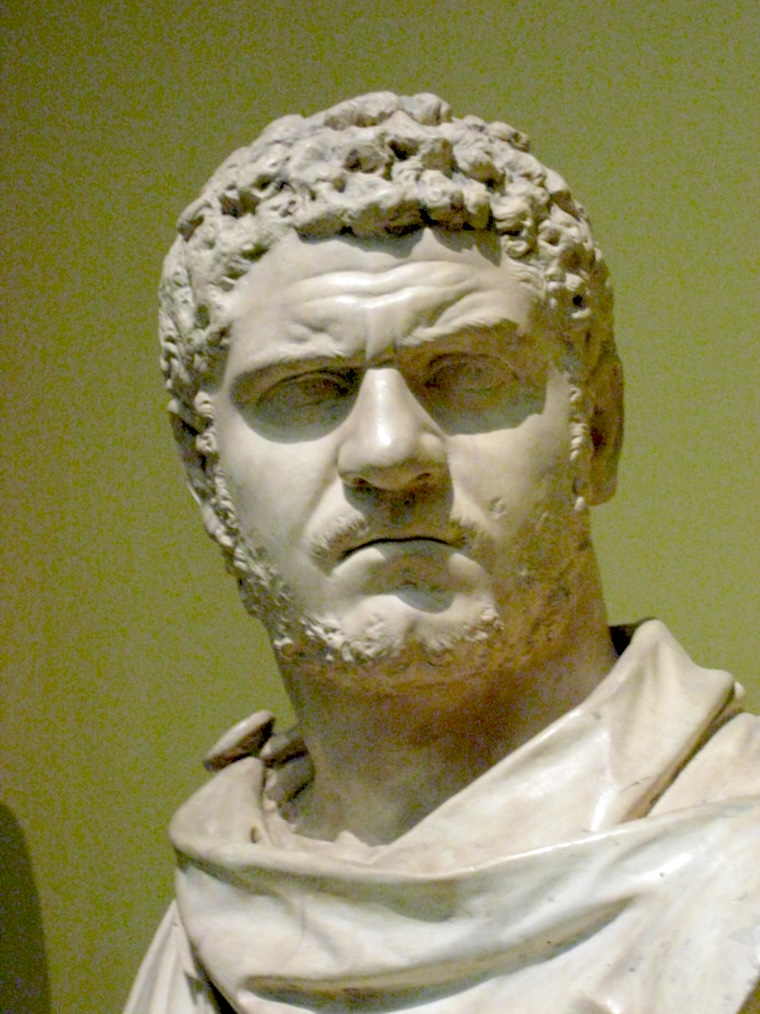
Caracalla

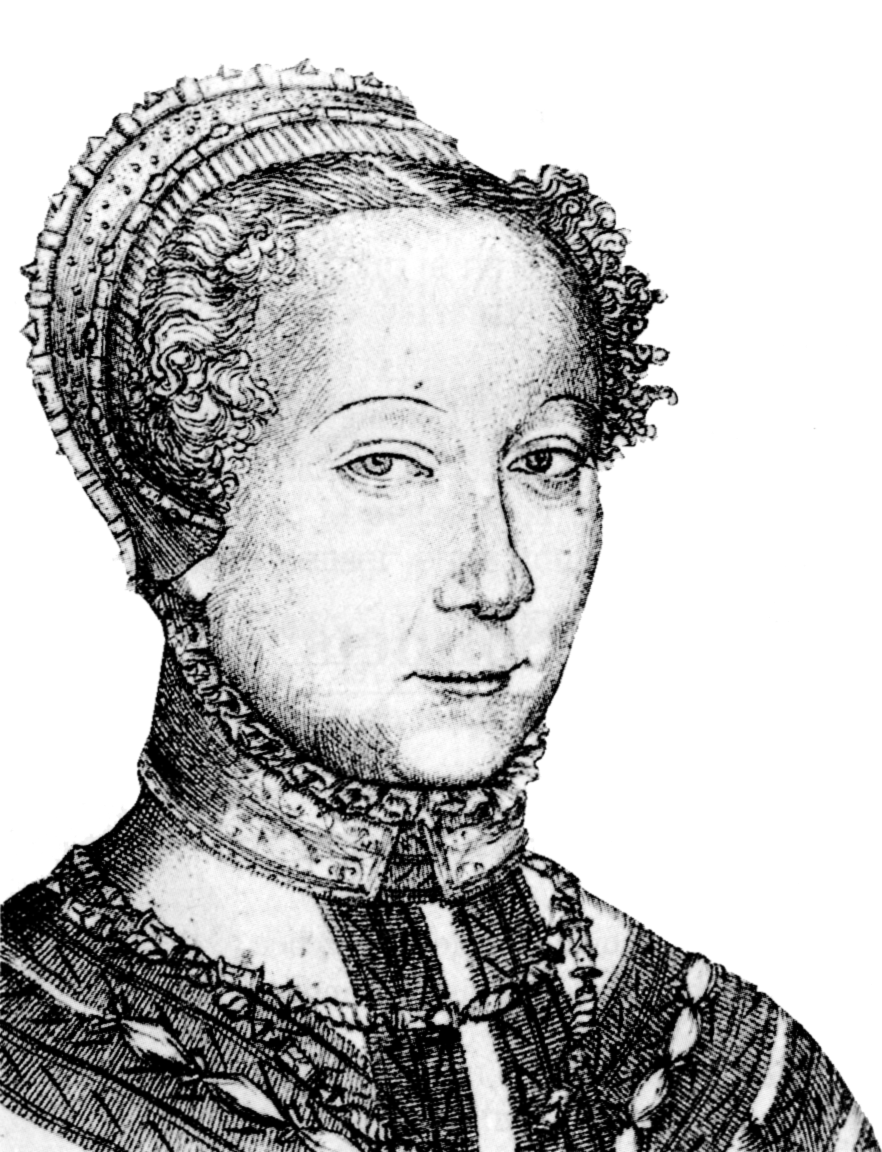
Louise Labé

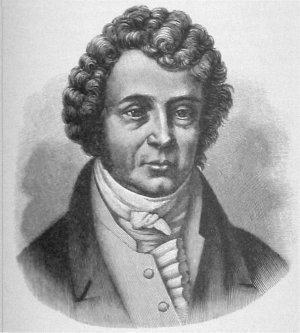
André-Marie Ampère

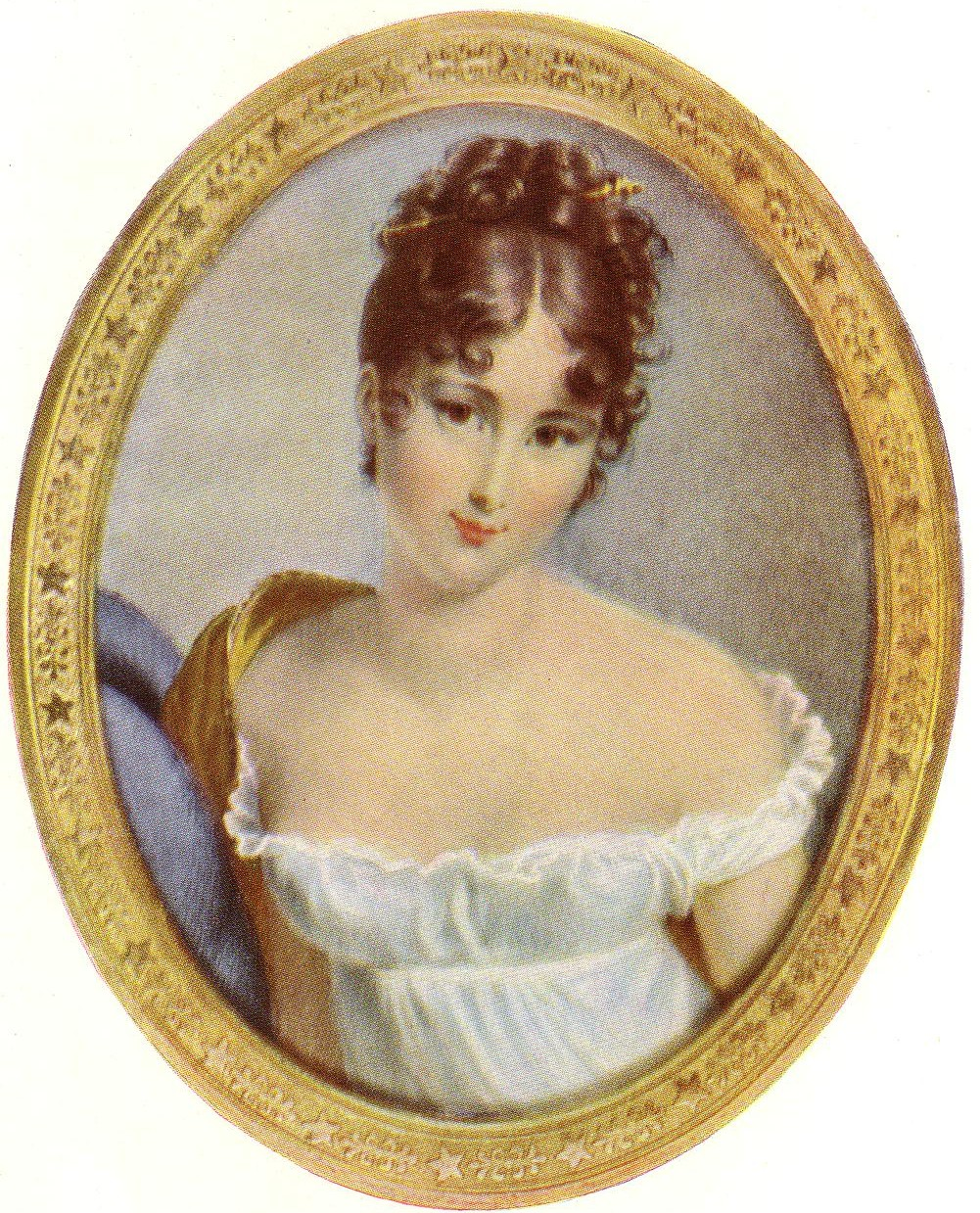
Juliette Récamier

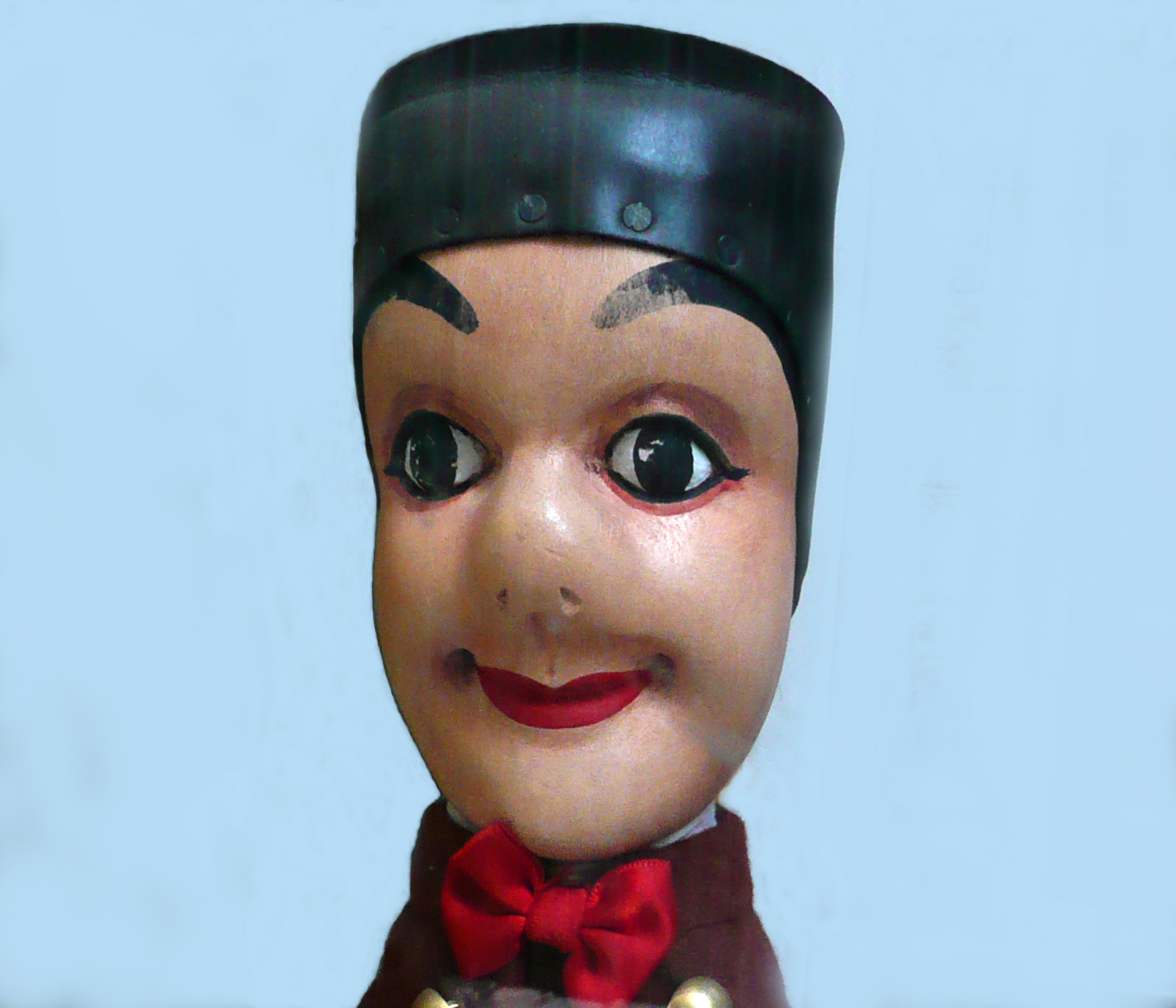
Guignol

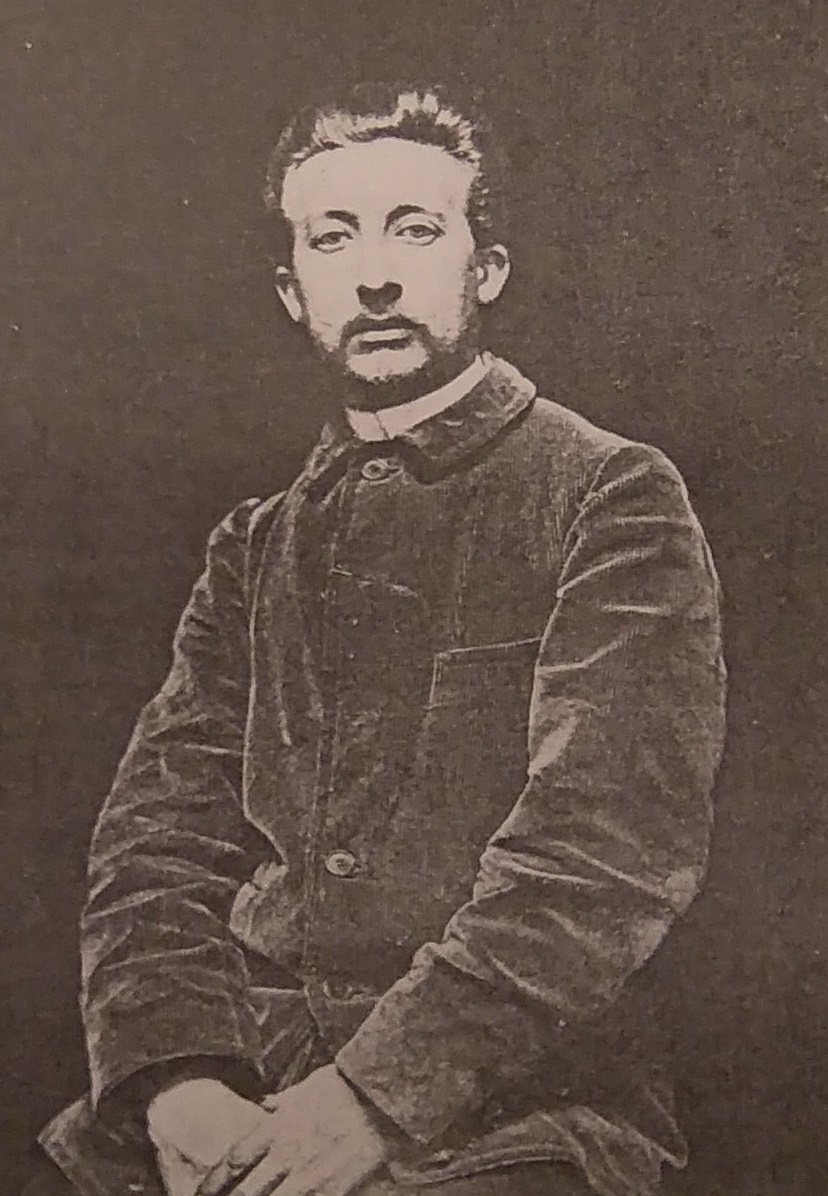
André César Vermare

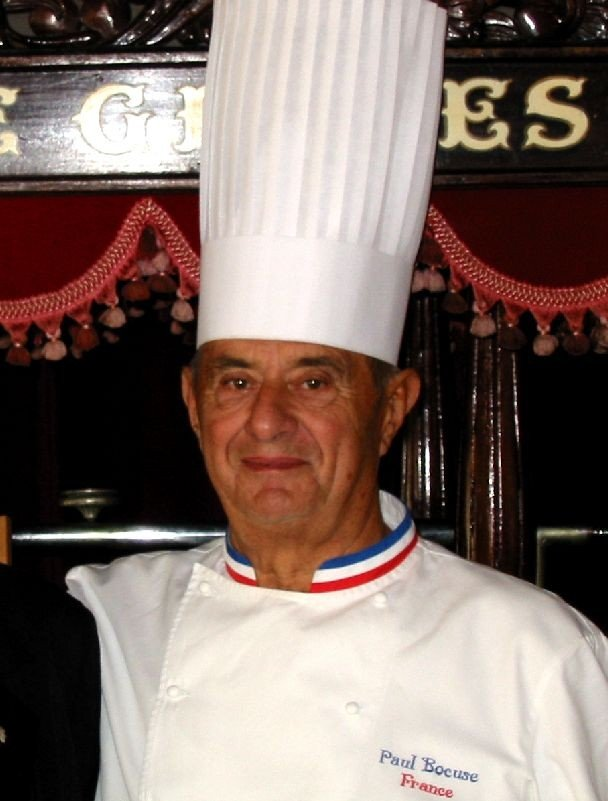
Paul Bocuse

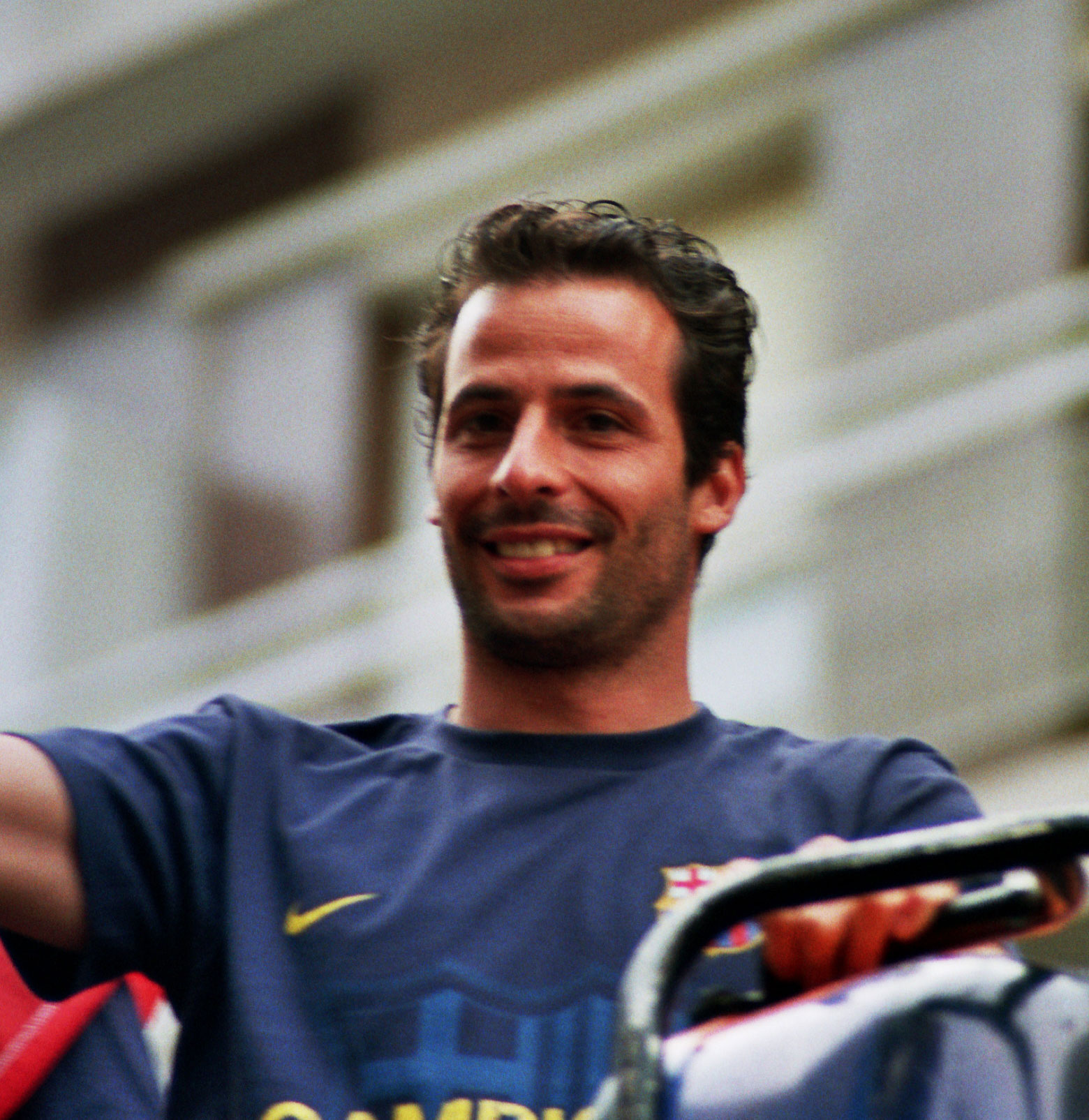
Ludovic Giuly

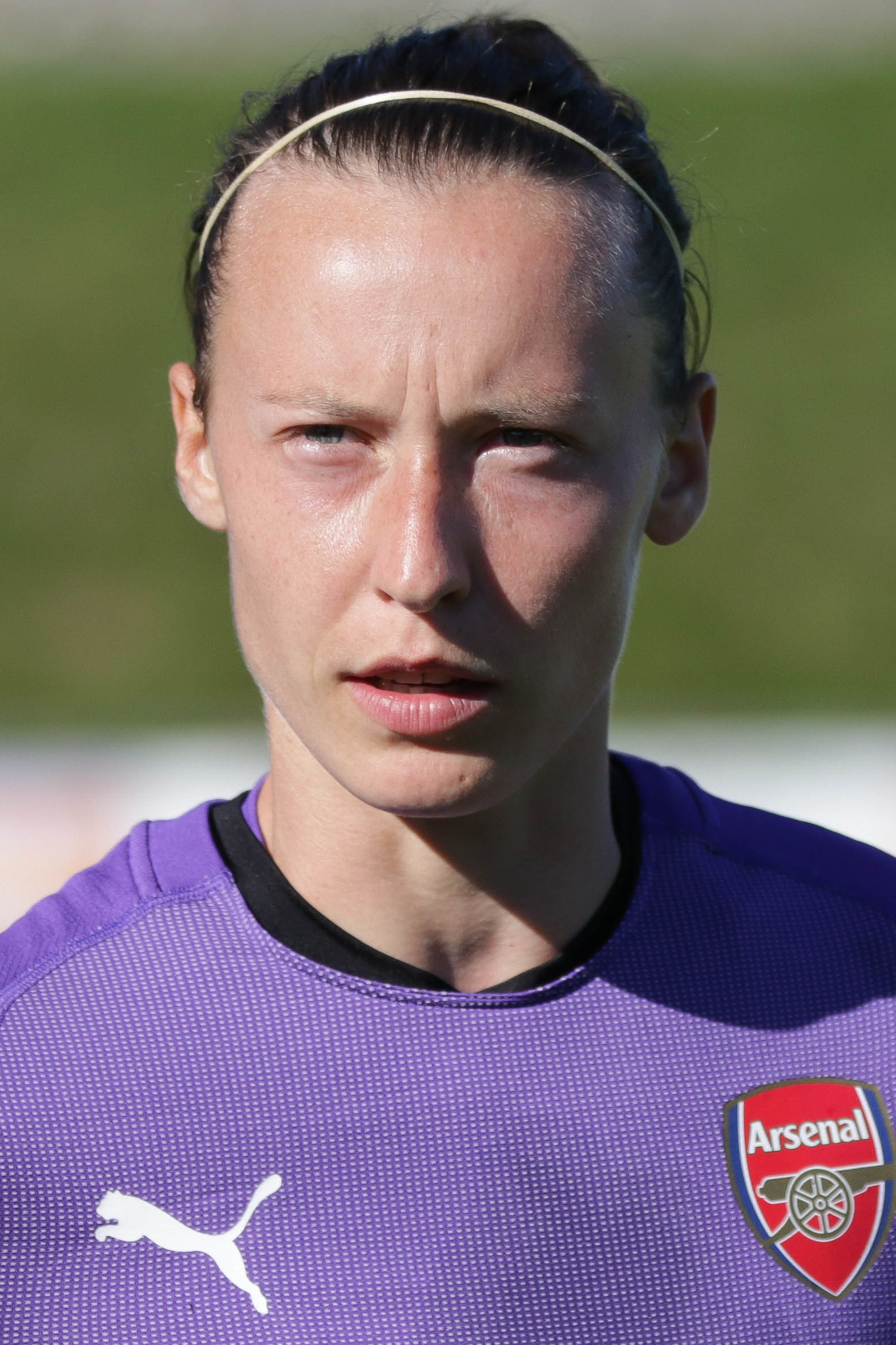
Pauline Peyraud-Magnin

== See also ==
- List of French people
