= Dunand =

Dunand is a surname. Notable people with the surname include:

- Bernard Dunand (born 1936), Swiss competitive sailor and Olympic medalist
- Françoise Dunand (born 1934), French historian and professor emeritus of the University of Strasbourg
- Jean Dunand (1877–1942), Swiss and French painter, sculptor, metal craftsman and interior designer
- Joe Dunand (born 1995), American baseball player
- Maurice Dunand (1898–1987), French archaeologist
- Victor-Napoléon Vuillerme-Dunand (1810–1876), French puppeteer
- Marie-Julien Dunand (1841–1915), French Catholic priest who was the apostolic vicar of North-Western Szechwan
