= Donzelague =

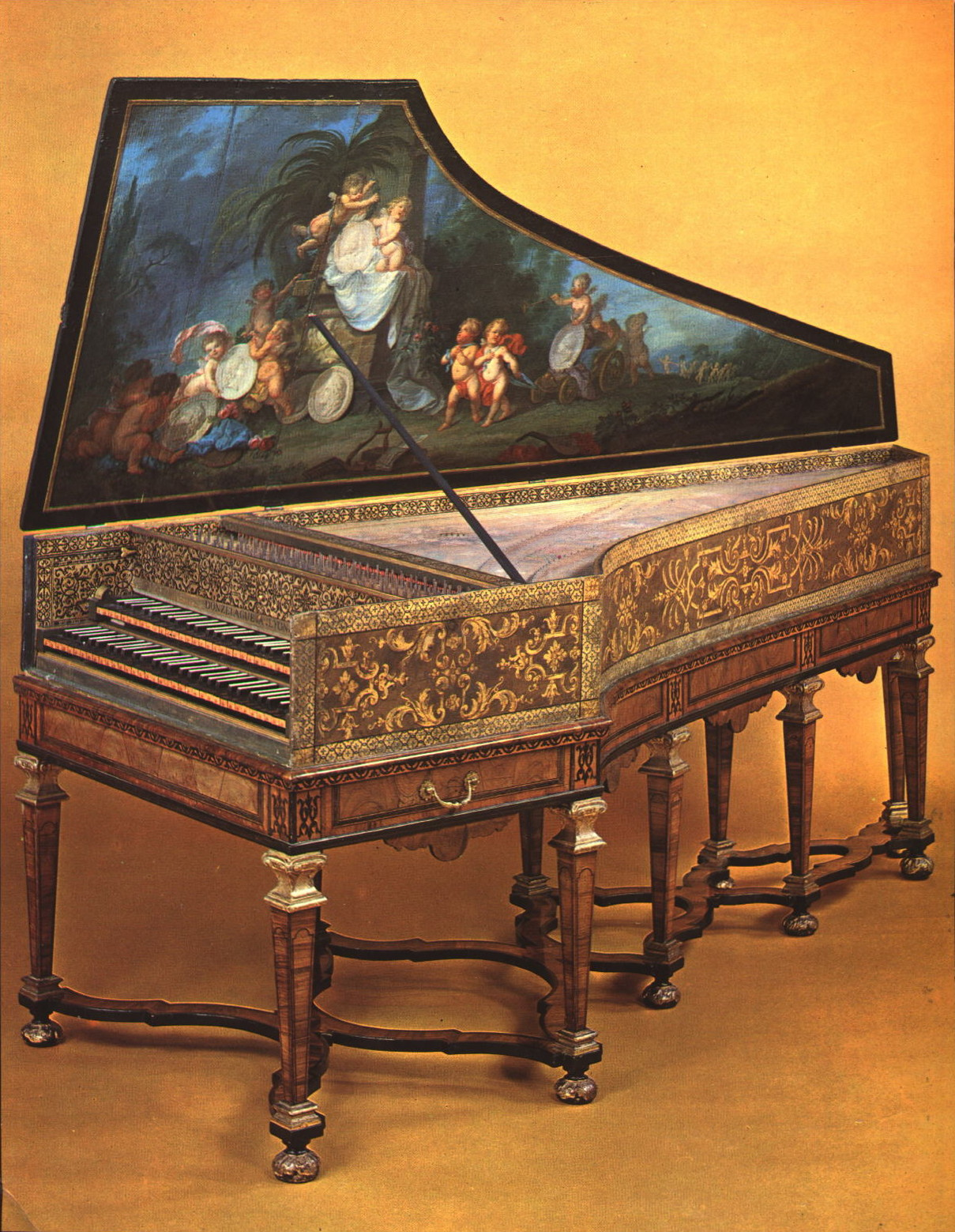
A harpsichord by Pierre Donzelague of Lyon, dated 1716

The Donzelagues were a family of harpsichord makers in southern France in the 17th and 18th centuries.

== Known builders of the family ==
Francois Donzelague was born in Bruges, Flanders, but moved to Aix-en-Provence to practice his trade. Otherwise, little is known of him.

Pierre Donzelague (born in Aix-en-Provence 1668, died in Lyon 1747), the son of Francois, set up shop in Lyon in 1688. He was known to be a performing cellist, gambist and singer at the opera in Lyon as well as an instrument maker. The last archival reference to Pierre is a 1750 advertisement offering several grand harpsichords by Donzelague for sale in Lyon, and it has been speculated that this represents liquidation of the Donzelague estate after his death.

== Surviving instruments ==
A well known, and often copied, double manual instrument dated 1716 by Pierre Donzelague is preserved in the Musée des Arts Décoratifs in Lyon. The instrument bears several hallmarks of Parisian instruments, including a half-curved/half-straight bentside. The full five octave range presents at an earlier date in this instrument than in any extant instrument from Donzelague's more cosmopolitan contemporaries in Paris, opening the question of whether he was one of the instrument's innovators.

The 1716 instrument is the only instrument that can definitively be attributed to a member of the Donzelague family, but a further seven instruments have been possibly attributed to them as well, most of which are in private collections.

== See also ==
- List of historical harpsichord makers
