= Milan Thomas =

Milan Thomas may refer to:

- Milan Thomas (footballer)
- Milan Thomas (para-cyclist)
