= Marie-Anne Leroudier =

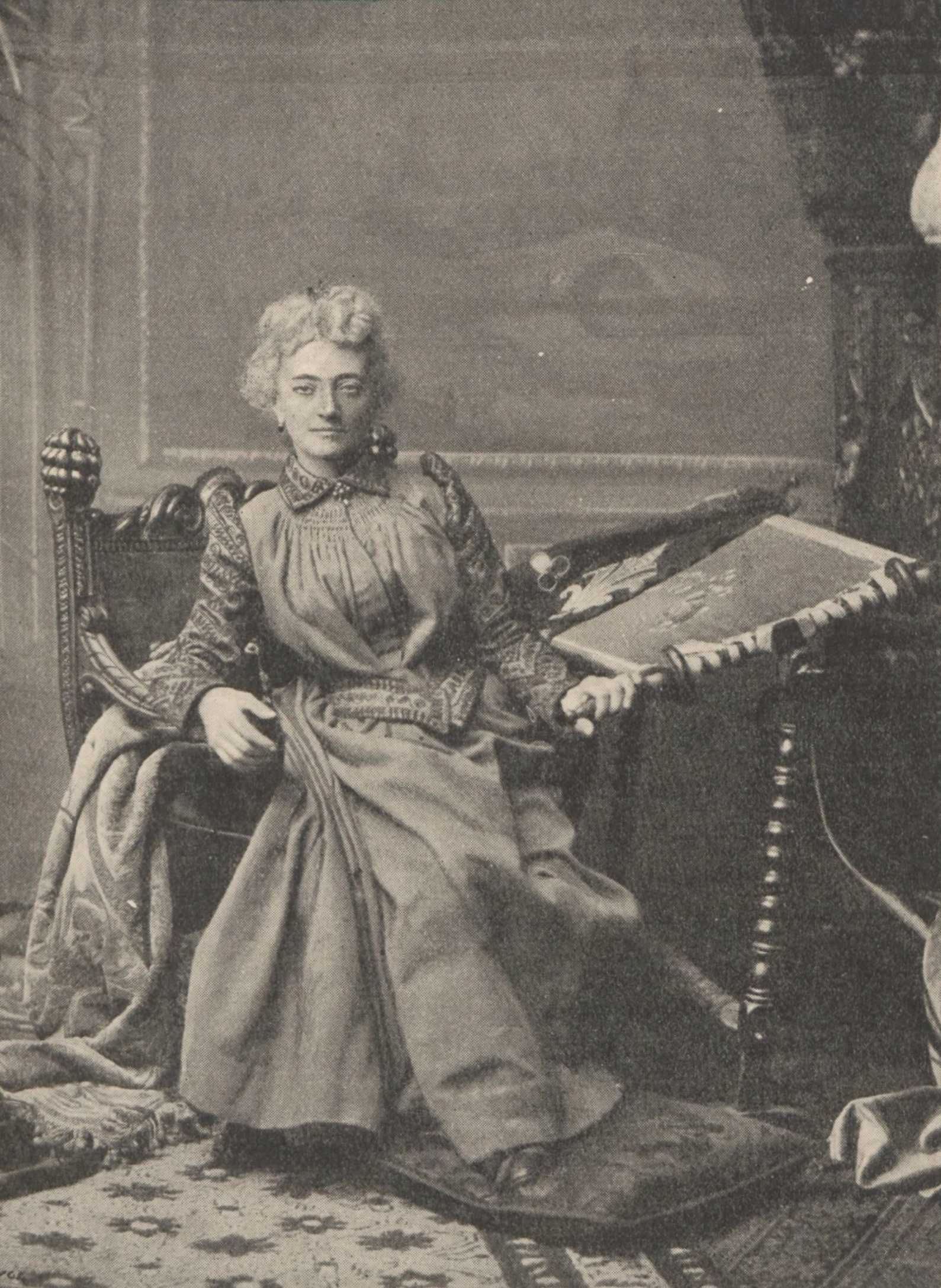
- (1 January 1908)
- Born: Marie-Anne Amélie Haug; 28 November 1838; Belfort, France
- Died: 26 April 1908 (aged 69); Lyon, France
- Education: Saint-Charles des Brotteaux school
- Known for: embroidery
- Notable work: Series of panels inspired by the Douze mois grotesques of Claude Audran III
- Spouse: Jean Leroudier (m. 1862)
- Awards: Gold medal, Decorative Arts Exhibition (Lyon, 1884); Gold medal, Exposition Universelle, (Anvers, 1885); Gold medal, Exposition Universelle (1889, Paris)
- Memorials: Rue Marie-Anne-Leroudier in Lyon

Marie-Anne Leroudier (née Haug; 28 November 1838 – 26 April 1908) was a French embroiderer who received awards at several international expositions. Some of her works were hung in the Paris Opera, while others were held by the Lateran Museum in Rome and the Textile Arts Museum in Lyon. A street in the latter city bears her name.

== Early life and education ==
Marie-Anne Amélie Haug was born in Belfort, 1838. She trained at the Saint-Charles des Brotteaux school, where her intelligence was recognized and stood out for her aptitude for needlework.

== Career ==
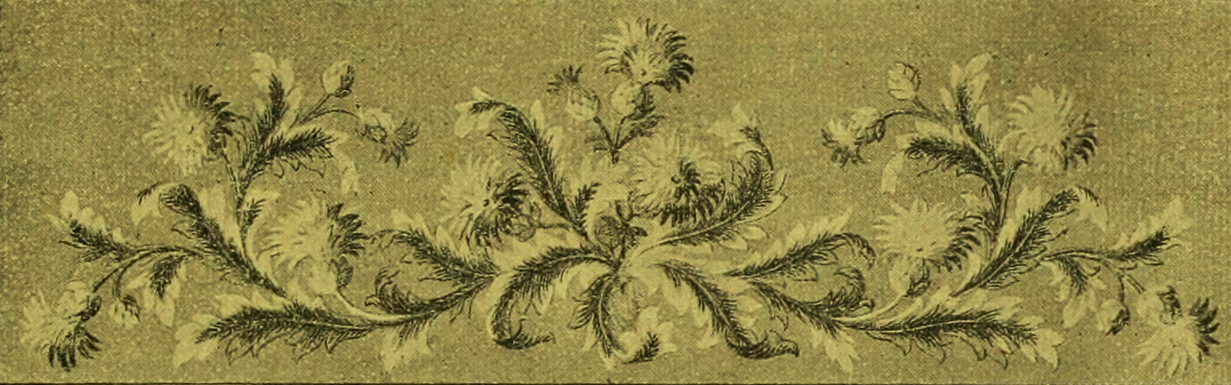
Bandeau brodé

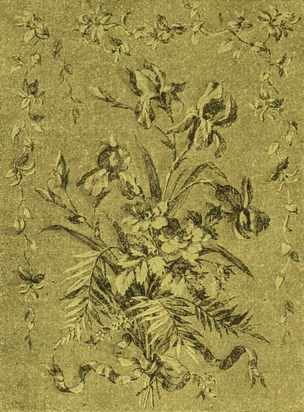
Écran brodé

In 1862, she married the draftsman Jean Leroudier, who worked on the Joseph-Albert Henry house, and enrolled in the drawing classes of Clothilde Alliod, director of the drawing course for women, annexed to the École des Beaux-Arts. Two years after her marriage, Leroudier set up an embroidery workshop specializing in the restoration of old fabrics which ensured her reputation with French and foreign collectors.

From 1867, Leroudier participated in all the major international decorative arts events and was awarded an honorable mention at the Exposition Universelle (1867, Paris) as a collaborator of the Lamy et Giraud house of Lyon. At the Lyon International Exhibition of 1872, she obtained a bronze medal as well as two bronze medals in Paris. At the Decorative Arts Exhibition in Lyon in 1884, she received the gold medal, and in 1885, another gold medal earned her the highest award granted to embroidery at the Exposition Universelle d'Anvers. At the Exposition Universelle (1889, Paris), she won a gold medal with the series of panels inspired by the Douze mois grotesques of Claude Audran III. In 1893, one of Leroudier's creations was exhibited in Chicago during the World's Columbian Exposition. In 1888, the Lyon municipality created a municipal embroidery course in collaboration with Leroudier's eldest daughter Jeanne-Marie, wife of Jean-Pierre Guillermet. In 1892, Leroudier published a book, La Broderie artistique (The Artistic Embroidery).

Among Leroudier's most remarkable works are the hangings for the Paris Opera, embroidered furnishings for Parisian houses (Krieger, Fourdinois) or Marseille (Blanqui), creative costumes for the Worth house, as well as court dresses and coats for the Queen of Greece and the Empress of Russia. Leroudier made religious vestments offered by the Roman Catholic Archdiocese of Lyon to Pope Pius IX in 1869 (cope, chasuble, stole, maniple, and chalice veil, all held in the Lateran Museum in Rome) and to Pope Leo XIII (chasuble). Several embroidered pieces reproduce famous paintings including Crucifixion by Anthony van Dyck. Several of Leroudier's works are kept at the Textile Arts Museum in Lyon, received by purchase or donation.

Leroudier was a valuable collaborator of Alexis Carrel. When the latter was still a young doctor, Leroudier welcomed him each evening at her home where he mastered embroidery, applying the technique to surgical sutures of blood vessels.

== Death and legacy ==
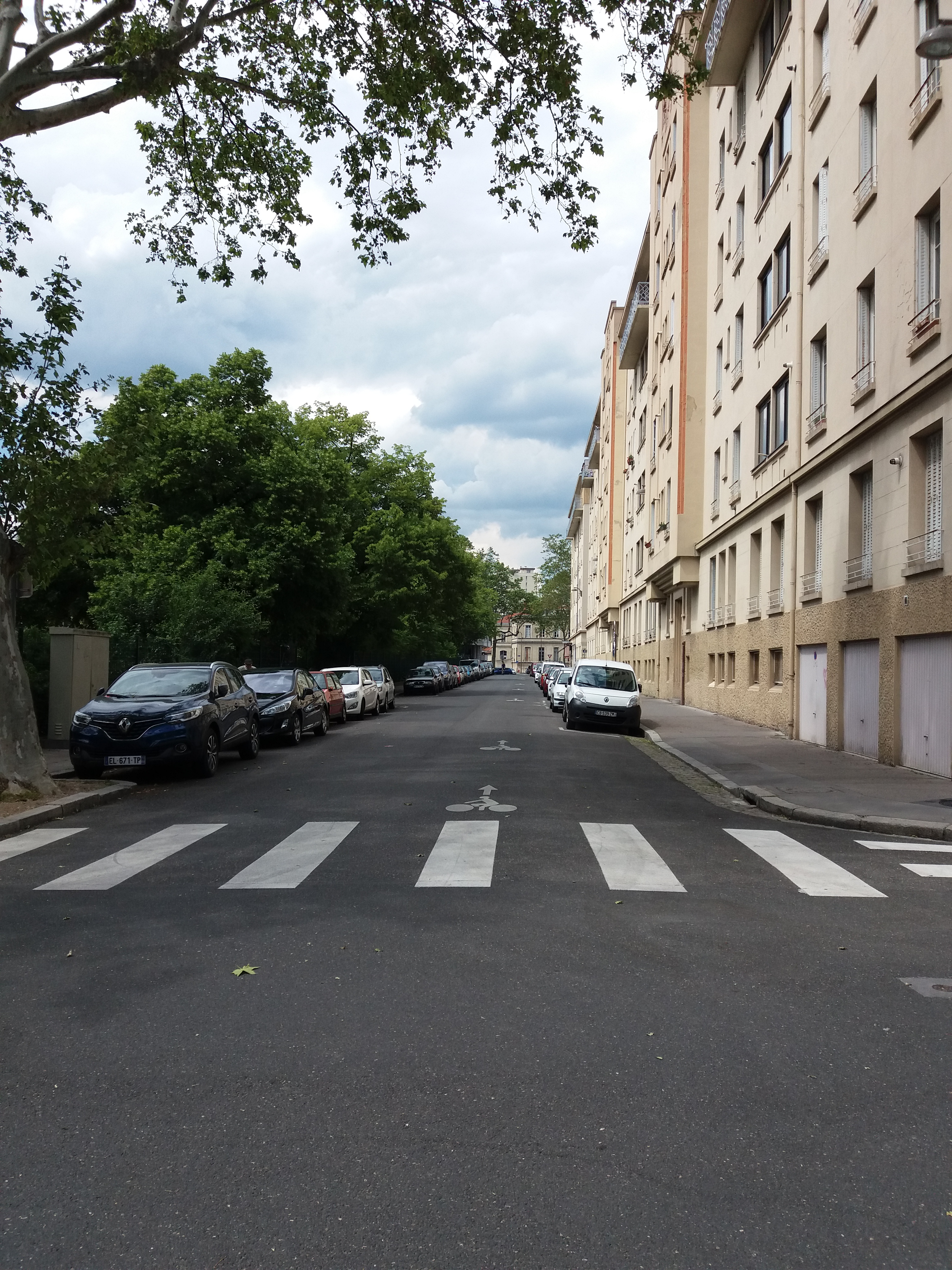
Rue Marie-Anne-Leroudier in Lyon

Marie-Anne Leroudier died in Lyon, 1908.

The rue Marie-Anne-Leroudier in the 1st arrondissement of Lyon is named in her honour.

== Awards and honours ==
- Gold medal, Decorative Arts Exhibition (Lyon, 1884)
- Gold medal, Exposition Universelle, (Anvers, 1885)
- Gold medal, Exposition Universelle (1889, Paris)

== Selected works ==
- Leroudier (Mme) (1892). La Broderie artistique de Mme Leroudier et la presse. (Mrs Leroudier's artistic embroidery and the press) (in French). Pitrat aîn. OCLC 493125236.
