= Laurent Mourguet =

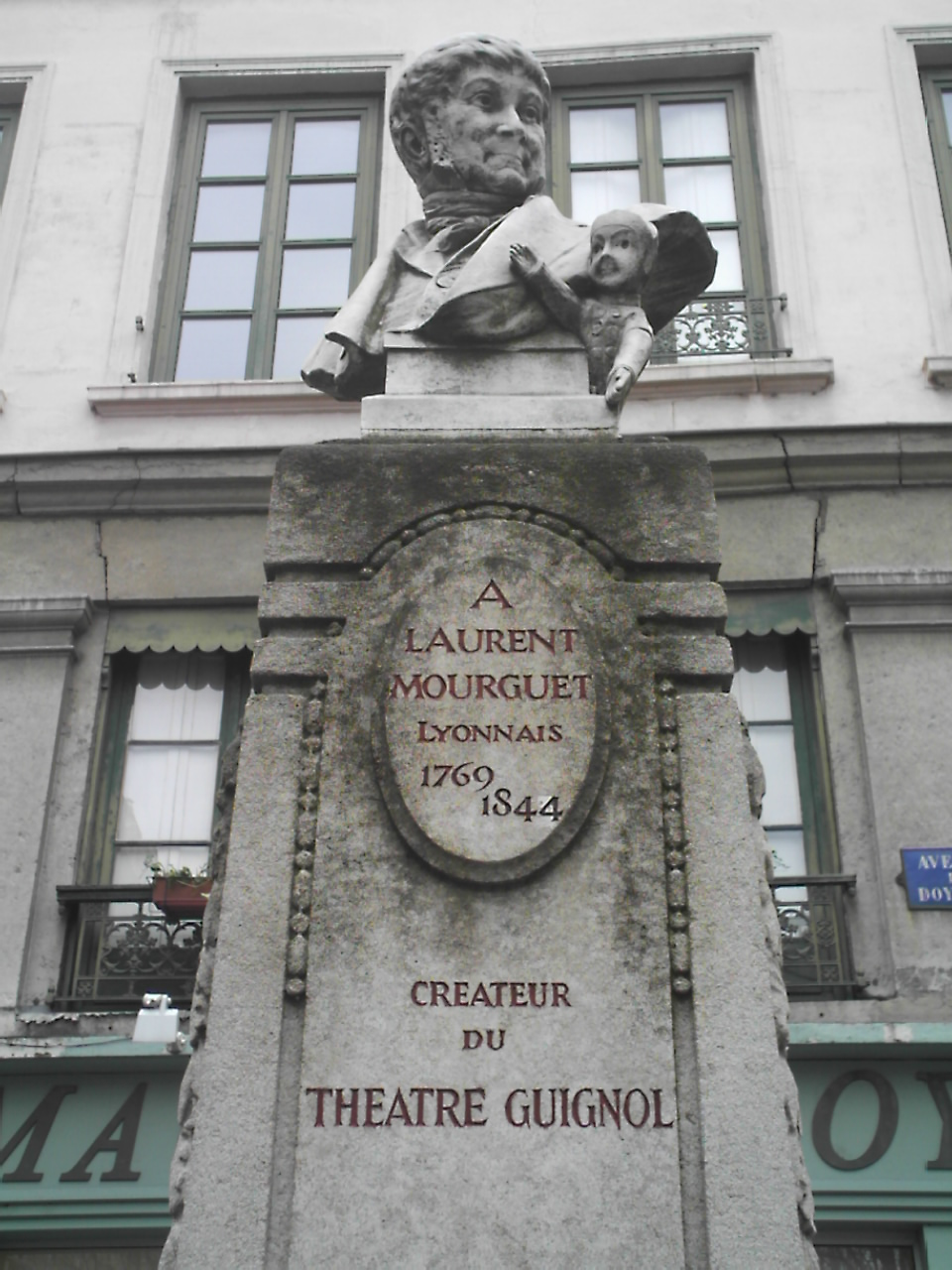
- Bust of Laurent Mourguet, avenue Doyenné (5th arrondissement of Lyon)
- Born: 3 March 1769; Lyon
- Died: 30 December 1844 (aged 75); Vienne
- Occupation(s): Puppeteer, Dentist
- Spouse: Jeanne Esterle

Laurent Mourguet (3 March 1769 – 30 December 1844) was a French puppeteer, creator of the famous puppet Guignol.

== See also ==
- Guignol
