= Gribouille =

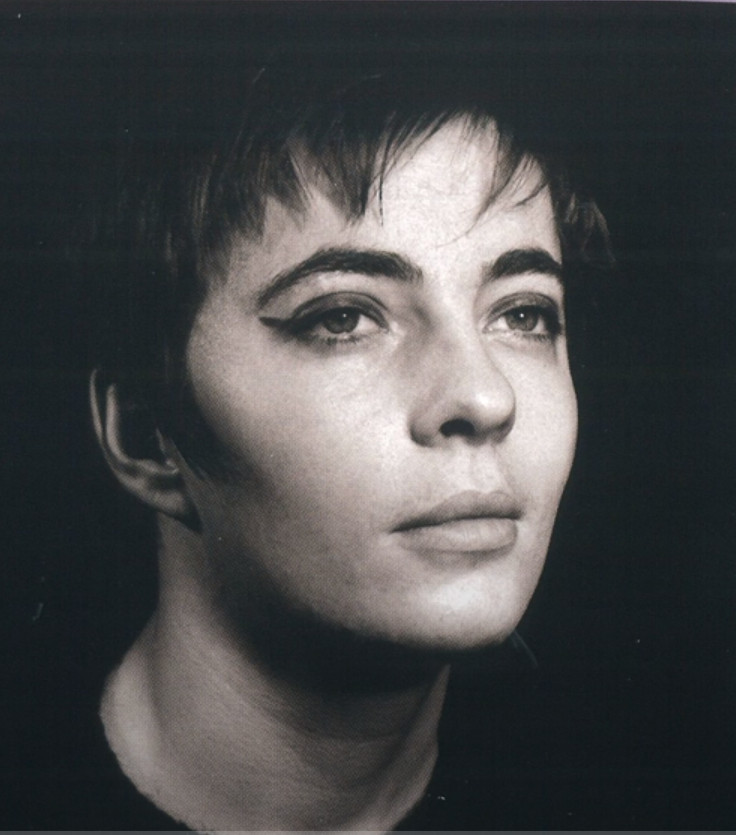

Background information
- Birth name: Marie-France Gaîté
- Born: 17 July 1941; Lyon, France
- Died: 18 January 1968 (aged 26); Paris, France
- Genres: Chanson
- Occupations: Singer; songwriter; musician
- Years active: 1963–1967
- Labels: Columbia; Pathé
- Website: www.friendship-first.com

Marie-France Gaite (French pronunciation: [maʁi fʁɑ̃s ɡete]; born 17 July 1941 in Lyon, France – died 18 January 1968), better known as Gribouille (French pronunciation: [ɡʁibuj]) was a singer, musician, and songwriter. As a teenager, she suffered from a mental disorder, and for a time was confined against her will to a psychiatric hospital in Lyon. With medication, she was able to function well enough to leave her hometown and she made her way to Paris. Gribouille, as she was called since her school days, is French for naive and foolishly happy people. Likely to throw themselves into a river to keep from getting wet in the rain.

In Paris she met Jean Cocteau while she was drawing art on the sidewalk with chalk. He drew a portrait of her and added "To my friend Gribouille." She carefully added an 'e' to ami (feminine gender for friend is amie), embarrassed that Cocteau thought she was a boy. She had a very androgynous appearance, and a deep voice, and Cocteau got her work singing in a cabaret. Since she was at the bottom, even these sleazy cabaret acts were a step up for her. In 1963, through sheer talent and her intense persona, she joined the roster of Pathé Records. She was hailed (as many were) as the new Édith Piaf, and also compared with Barbara. Charles Dumont, who wrote many of Piaf's hits, also began writing songs for her. Composer Michel Breuzard also wrote music for her, and in 1966 she recorded several EP's and her first album. She appeared many times on television to sing her songs.

She died in Paris, France, at the age of 26 from an excess of alcohol and drugs. She joined many famous and historical figures buried in the Jewish Cimetière parisien de Bagneux in Montrouge, southwest of Paris.

== Discography ==
=== Albums ===
- Mathias (1998), EMI France
- Mourir De Joie (2010), EMI France

=== EPs ===
- Si J'Ai Le Coeur En Berne (1964), EMI

"Si J'Ai Le Coeur En Berne" / "Chagrin" / "Si Tu Ne Rentres" / "J'Irai Danser Quand Meme"

- Les Corbeaux (1965), EMI

"Les Roses Barbelees" / "Les Corbeaux" / "Mourir Demain" / "Pauvre Camille"

- Viens Danser, Marie (1965), EMI

"Elle T'Attend" / "Viens Danser, Marie" / "A Courte Paille" / "C'Est Toi Qui Me L'As Dit"

- Gueule De Bois (1965), EMI

"Mathias" / "Gueule De Bois" / "Grenoble" / "Le Temps Qui Vient"
