= Louis Maynard =

Louis-Séraphin Maynard (17 September 1871 – 26 August 1940) was a French writer and regional historian.

== Biography ==
Maynard was born in Lyon and completed his classical studies at Lycée Ampère in the city before going on to the faculty of law. He obtained his PhD in law and enrolled at the bar, but worked in the insurance industry, first in Lyon and then in Montpellier. On his return to Villeurbanne, he created the library in the new town hall in 1930. He was a scholar and passionate about the history of Lyon and wrote numerous notices on the history of the city as well as chronicles in reviews of history, and interventions on Radio-Lyon.

Maynard is known for several books and notices on the history of Lyon, including Histoire, légendes et anecdotes à propos des rues de Lyon, avec indication de ce qu'on peut y remarquer en les parcourant (Éditions des Traboules, original edition 1922, several reissues) and Dictionnaire des Lyonnaiseries. He died in Lyon in 1940.
