= Guignol =

Main character in a French puppet show

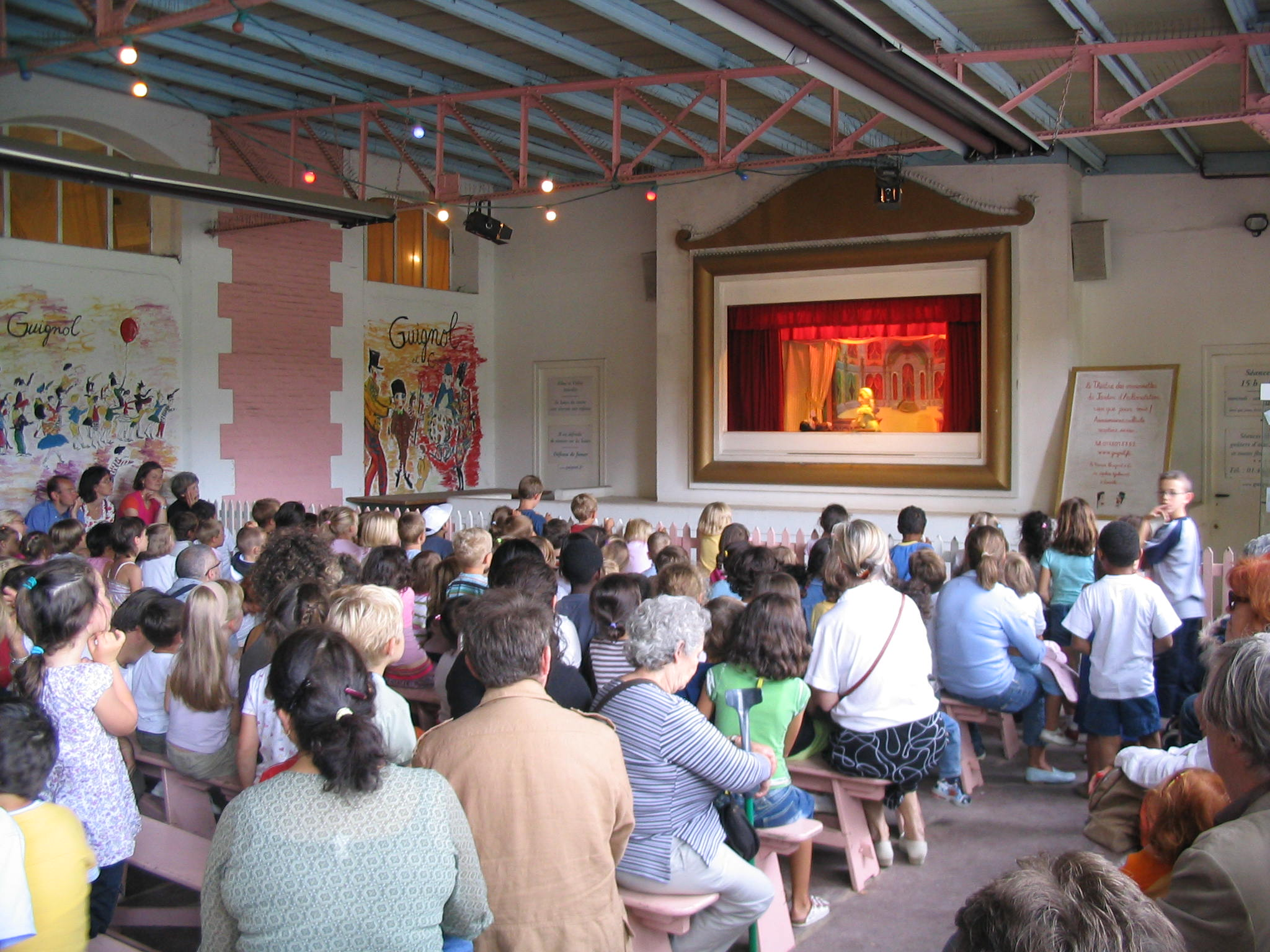
A Guignol show being performed in Paris.

Guignol (French: [ɡiɲɔl]) is the main character in a French puppet show which has come to bear his name. It represents the workers in the silk industry of France. Although often thought of as children's entertainment, Guignol's sharp wit and linguistic verve have always been appreciated by adults as well, as shown by the motto of a prominent Lyon troupe: "Guignol amuses children… and witty adults."

== History ==
Laurent Mourguet, Guignol's creator, was born into a family of modest silk weavers on 3 March 1769. The certificate of his marriage to Jeanne Esterle in 1788 shows he was unable to read. When hard times fell on the silk trade during the French Revolution, he became a peddler and, in 1797, started to practice dentistry, which in those days was simply the pulling of teeth. The service was free; the money was made from the medicines sold afterward to ease the pain. To attract patients, he started setting up a puppet show in front of his dentist's chair.

Mourguet's first shows featured Polichinelle, a character borrowed from the Italian commedia dell'arte who, in Britain, would become Punch. By 1804, the success was such that he gave up dentistry altogether and became a professional puppeteer, creating his own scenarios drawing on the concerns of his working-class audience and improvising references to the news of the day. He developed characters closer to the daily lives of his Lyon audience, first Gnafron, a wine-loving cobbler, later Guignol, in 1808. Other characters, including Guignol's wife Madelon and the gendarme Flageolet soon followed, but these are never much more than foils for the two heroes.

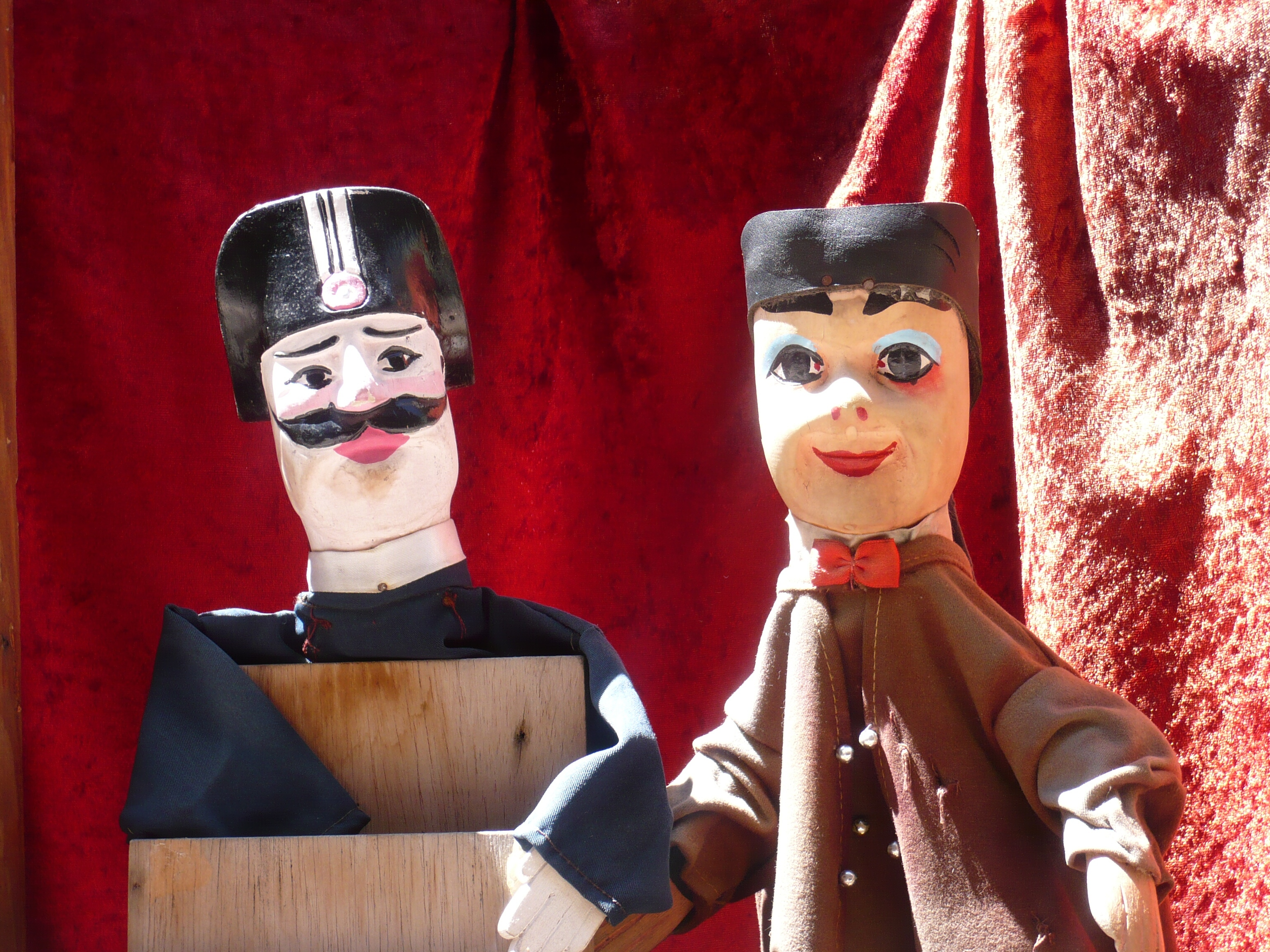
Flageolet (left) and Guignol (right).

Although nominally a silkweaver like much of his original audience, Guignol's profession changes, as does his marital status; he can be in turn valet, peddler, carpenter, shoemaker, or unemployed; at times he is Madelon's husband, at times her smitten suitor, according to requirements of the scenario. What remain constant are his poverty, but more importantly his good humor and his sense of justice. The use in French of "guignol" as an insult meaning "buffoon" is a curious misnomer, as Guignol is clever, courageous, and generous; his inevitable victory is always the triumph of good over evil.

Sixteen of Mourguet's children and grandchildren continued his tradition, and many of the companies performing today can trace their artistic heritage back to him, although Laurent Mourguet's last descendant, Jean-Guy Mourguet, died on 8 October 2012, at the age of 82, after working all his life in the Theatre de Guignol at Lyon. Jean-Guy learned his job helping his grandmother Augustine and then his parents. He later became the director of the theatre until his death.

Guignol's original caustic satire has often been watered down to simple children's fare, and has even been used to parody grand opera, but his original spirit still survives in his hometown of Lyon, where both traditional and original contemporary performances are an integral part of local culture. In addition to his social satire, Guignol has become an important protector of the local dialect, the parler lyonnais ("Lyonnais dialect").

== See also ==
- Les Guignols de l'info
- Victor-Napoléon Vuillerme-Dunand
- Grand Guignol
- Punch and Judy
