= Victor-Napoléon Vuillerme-Dunand =

Victor-Napoléon Vuillerme-Dunand (1810 in Turin – 4 May 1876) was a 19th-century French puppeteer whose family originated from Jura. He was one of the greatest manipulators of the théâtre de Guignol in the nineteenth century, especially the character of Gnafron. He is the author of one of three original sources of the classical repertoire of the Lyon theater dating from 1852.
