= Étienne Rognon =

French politician

Étienne Rognon (17 September 1869, Lyon - 18 March 1948) was a French politician. He joined at first the French Workers' Party (POF), which in 1902 merged into the Socialist Party of France (PSdF), which in turn merged into the French Section of the Workers' International (SFIO) in 1905. He was a member of the Chamber of Deputies from 1909 to 1932. A street in the 7th arrondissement of Lyon is named after him.
