= Milan Thomas (footballer) =

French footballer (born 1986)

Personal information
- Full name: Milan Thomas
- Date of birth: 21 January 1986 (age 40)
- Place of birth: Lyon, France
- Position: Midfielder

Youth career
- -2005: Lyon

Senior career*
Years	Team	Apps	(Gls)
2006-2008	Metz	1	(0)
2008	→ Cannes (loan)		
2008	Cannes		
2008-2009	Livingston		
2009-2010	Pavia		
2010-2011	GAP	29	(0)
2011-2014	GOAL	52	(2)
- * Club domestic league appearances and goals as of 17:00, 5 November 2022 (UTC)

Milan Thomas (born 21 January 1986) is a French former professional footballer who played as a midfielder.

== Club career ==
Thomas started his career with Lyon but signed their first professional contract with Metz in June 2006.

Following just one first team appearance for Metz, he signed for Cannes on loan in January 2008. He made the move to Cannes permanent in 2008.

In November 2008, Thomas signed for Scottish side Livingston on a short-term deal following a successful trial. However, the Livi manager Roberto Landi was sacked a few days after bringing Thomas to the club.

Thomas left Scotland following the expiration of his contract and signed for Italian side Pavia. After just one season with the club, he returned to France to sign for GAP in July 2010.

The following season, the midfielder signed for GOAL where he played for three years before retiring from playing.
