= Textile Arts Museum =

Musée des Tissus
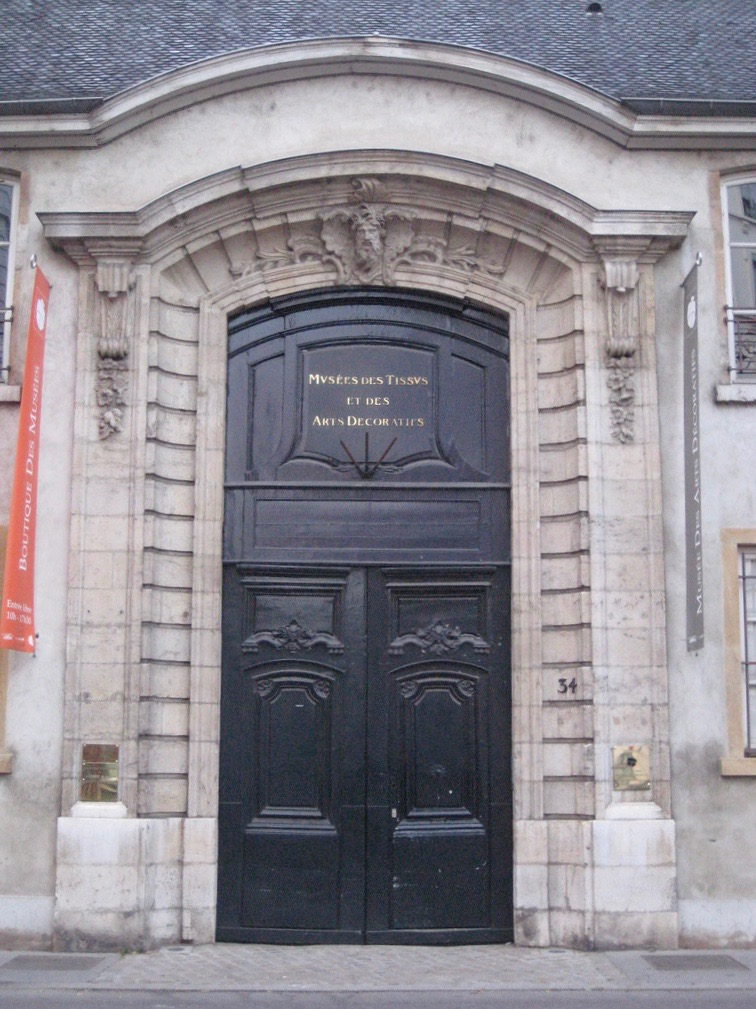
- Entrance of the Musée des Tissus
- Established: 1864
- Location: 34 rue de la Charité; 69002 Lyon, France
- Coordinates: 45.766846°N 4.83363°E
- Type: Art museum, Textile museum
- Visitors: 131 800 (2009)
- Website: www.museedestissus.fr

The Textile Arts Museum (French Musée des Tissus) is a museum in the city of Lyon, France. Located in two 18th century hôtels particuliers of Lyon's 2nd arrondissement, the institution consists in two distinct collections: the textiles collection and the decorative arts collection.

Founded in 1864, the musée des Tissus houses one of the largest international collection of textiles, the holdings amounting to 2,500,000 units. The collection spans a 4,000 year period, from Antiquity to the present, and covers a wide range of techniques and all the geographical areas of the world. The history of Lyon's silk industry is particularly well represented in the collection.

The decorative arts collection holds works in many different fields: furniture, majolica, drawings, jewelry, painting, sculpture etc.
